= List of Private Passions episodes (2020–present) =

This is a list of Private Passions episodes from 2020 to present. It does not include repeated episodes or compilations.

== 2020 ==
| Date | Guest | Composer | Title | Performer / Label |
|---|---|---|---|---|
| 5 Jan 2020 | Carlo Rovelli | Ludwig van Beethoven | Benedictus (Missa Solemnis) | Orchestra: New York Philharmonic, conductor: Bruno Walter |
| 5 Jan 2020 | Carlo Rovelli | Antonio Vivaldi | Violin Concerto in B♭ major, Rv. 583 | Performer: Piero Toso, orchestra: I Solisti Veneti, conductor: Claudio Scimone |
| 5 Jan 2020 | Carlo Rovelli | Arvo Pärt | Für Alina | Performer: Jeroen van Veen |
| 5 Jan 2020 | Carlo Rovelli | Wolfgang Amadeus Mozart | "Dies Irae" (Requiem) | Choir: Choir of New College Oxford, orchestra: Orchestra of the Age of Enlightenment, conductor: Edward Higginbottom |
| 5 Jan 2020 | Carlo Rovelli | Philip Glass | "Knee Play 5" (Einstein on the Beach) | Ensemble: Philip Glass Ensemble, conductor: Michael Riesman |
| 5 Jan 2020 | Carlo Rovelli | Franz Schubert | Piano Trio No. 2 in E♭ major (2nd movement: Andante) | Ensemble: Beaux Arts Trio |
| 5 Jan 2020 | Carlo Rovelli | Johann Sebastian Bach | "Wir eilen mit schwachen" (Jesu, der du meine Seele, BWV 78) | Singers: Julianne Baird (soprano), Allan Fast (countertenor), ensemble: Bach-Collegium Stuttgart, conductor: Joshua Rifkin |
| 12 Jan 2020 | Helen Cammock | Barbara Strozzi | "Che si puo fare" | Performers: Leonardo García Alarcón, Mariana Flores, ensemble: Cappella Mediterranea |
| 12 Jan 2020 | Helen Cammock | Traditional Danish | Sekstur from Vendsyssel/The Peat Dance | Ensemble: Danish String Quartet |
| 12 Jan 2020 | Helen Cammock | Francesca Caccini | Ciaconna | Ensemble: Cappella di Santa Maria degli Angiolini, conductor: Gian Luca Lastraioli. |
| 12 Jan 2020 | Helen Cammock | J. S. Bach | Goldberg Variations, BWV 988 (Aria & Variations 1 & 2) | Performer: Glenn Gould |
| 12 Jan 2020 | Helen Cammock | Henry Purcell | "Thy hand Belinda... When I am laid in earth" (from Dido and Aeneas) | Singer: Jessye Norman |
| 12 Jan 2020 | Helen Cammock | Dmitri Shostakovich | Cello Concerto No. 1 in E♭ major (1st movement: Allegretto) | Performer: Truls Mørk, orchestra: Oslo Philharmonic, conductor: Vasily Petrenko |
| 12 Jan 2020 | Helen Cammock | Nina Simone | "African Mailman" | Performer: Nina Simone |
| 19 Jan 2020 | William Sieghart | W. A. Mozart | Piano Concerto No. 18 in B♭ major, K. 456 (2nd movement: Andante un poco sostenuto) | Performer: Imogen Cooper, orchestra: Northern Sinfonia of England |
| 19 Jan 2020 | William Sieghart | Schubert | "Ständchen" (No. 4 of Schwanengesang) | Performer: Lise de la Salle. Music arranger: Franz Liszt |
| 19 Jan 2020 | William Sieghart | J. S. Bach | Concerto for Two Violins in D minor (1st movement: Allegro) | Violins: Isabelle Faust, Bernhard Forck, Akademie für Alte Musik Berlin |
| 19 Jan 2020 | William Sieghart | Claude Debussy | "Clair de lune" | Performer: Paul Crossley |
| 19 Jan 2020 | William Sieghart | The Skatalites | "Swing Easy" | Ensemble: The Skatalites |
| 19 Jan 2020 | William Sieghart | Felix Mendelssohn | Song without Words, Op. 30, No. 6 | Performer: Murray Perahia |
| 2 Feb 2020 | James Thornton | Jean Sibelius | Violin Concerto in D minor (3rd movement: Allegro) | Performer: Jascha Heifetz. Orchestra: Chicago Symphony Orchestra. Conductor: Walter Hendl. |
| 2 Feb 2020 | James Thornton | W. A. Mozart | "Der Hölle Rache" (from The Magic Flute, Act 2) | Singer: Lucia Popp. Orchestra: Philharmonia Orchestra. Conductor: Otto Klemperer. |
| 2 Feb 2020 | James Thornton | Brian Eno | "Just Another Day" | Performer: Brian Eno. |
| 2 Feb 2020 | James Thornton | J. S. Bach | Gottes Zeit ist die allerbeste Zeit | Pianos: György Kurtág, Márta Kurtág. Music arranger: György Kurtág |
| 2 Feb 2020 | James Thornton | Béla Bartók | "Sebes (Fast Dance)" (Contrasts, 3rd movement) | Performer: Benny Goodman. Performer: Joseph Szigeti. Performer: Béla Bartók. |
| 2 Feb 2020 | James Thornton | Lou Harrison | "La Koro Sutro" (excerpt) | Choir: Chamber Chorus of University of California, Berkeley. Ensemble: American Gamelan Ensemble. Conductor: Philip Brett. |
| 9 Feb 2020 | Ann Wroe | Schubert | Piano Sonata in C minor, D 958 (4th movement: Allegro) | Performer: Alfred Brendel |
| 9 Feb 2020 | Ann Wroe | William Walton | Symphony No. 1 (1st movement: Allegro assai) | Orchestra: Orchestra of Opera North. Conductor: Paul Daniel. |
| 9 Feb 2020 | Ann Wroe | Jacques Brel | "Les Remparts de Varsovie" | Performer: Jacques Brel. |
| 9 Feb 2020 | Ann Wroe | Frank Bridge | The Sea (3rd movement: Moonlight) | Orchestra: Royal Liverpool Philharmonic Orchestra. Conductor: Sir Charles Groves. |
| 9 Feb 2020 | Ann Wroe | Jonathan Dove | "Seek Him that maketh the seven stars" | Choir: Choir of St John's College, Cambridge. Conductor: Andrew Nethsingha. |
| 9 Feb 2020 | Ann Wroe | Ralph Vaughan Williams | "The Roadside Fire" (Songs of Travel) | Performer: Viola Tunnard. Singer: John Shirley-Quirk. |
| 9 Feb 2020 | Ann Wroe | Maurice Ravel | Rigaudon (Le Tombeau de Couperin) | Orchestra: Les Siècles. Conductor: François-Xavier Roth. |
| 16 Feb 2020 | Jonathan Aitken | George Frideric Handel | "Ev'ry Valley" (Messiah) | Singer: Richard Lewis. Orchestra: Royal Liverpool Philharmonic Orchestra. Conductor: Malcolm Sargent. |
| 16 Feb 2020 | Jonathan Aitken | Traditional Irish | "The Garden Where the Praties Grow" | Performer: John McCormack. |
| 16 Feb 2020 | Jonathan Aitken | Benjamin Britten | "Sammy's bath" (The little sweep) | Orchestra: English Opera Group. Conductor: Benjamin Britten. |
| 16 Feb 2020 | Jonathan Aitken | Richard Wagner | Entry of the Gods into Valhalla (Das Rheingold) | Singer: Iain Paterson. Orchestra: Hallé. Conductor: Sir Mark Elder. |
| 16 Feb 2020 | Jonathan Aitken | Beethoven | "O welche Lust" (Fidelio) | Choir: Arnold Schoenberg Chor. Orchestra: Lucerne Festival Orchestra. Conductor: Claudio Abbado. |
| 16 Feb 2020 | Jonathan Aitken | Joseph Barnby | "Psalm 24" | Performer: Andrew Lumsden. Choir: Choir of Westminster Abbey. Conductor: Martin Neary |
| 16 Feb 2020 | Jonathan Aitken | Arthur Sullivan | "When I was a lad" (H.M.S. Pinafore) | Performer: John Reed. Orchestra: D'Oyly Carte Opera Orchestra. Conductor: Isidore Godfrey. |
| 16 Feb 2020 | Jonathan Aitken | Handel | "All we like sheep" (Messiah) | Singer: Emma Kirkby. Orchestra: Academy of Ancient Music. Conductor: Christopher Hogwood. |
| 23 Feb 2020 | Chibundu Onuzo | Christian Petzold | Minuet in G | Performer: Lang Lang. |
| 23 Feb 2020 | Chibundu Onuzo | Handel | "Hallelujah Chorus" (Messiah) | Orchestra: City of Prague Philharmonic Orchestra. Conductor: David Temple. Choir: Crouch End Festival Chorus. |
| 23 Feb 2020 | Chibundu Onuzo | Traditional music | "I Wonder as I Wander" | Singer: Gerald Finley. Choir: The Cambridge Singers. Conductor: John Rutter. |
| 23 Feb 2020 | Chibundu Onuzo | Antonín Dvořák | Symphony No. 9 in E minor (From the New World) (2nd movement: Largo) | Orchestra: Chineke! Orchestra, conductor: Kevin John Edusei |
| 23 Feb 2020 | Chibundu Onuzo | Fela Kuti | "Water no get enemy" | Performer: Fela Kuti. |
| 23 Feb 2020 | Chibundu Onuzo | Walter Donaldson | "My Baby Just Cares for Me" | Lyricist: Gus Kahn. Performer: Nina Simone. |
| 23 Feb 2020 | Chibundu Onuzo | Ken Okeke | "The Lord is my Shepherd" (Psalm 23) | Performer: Chibundu Onuzo. |
| 1 Mar 2020 | Piers Gough | William Walton | "The Writing on the Wall" (Belshazzar's Feast) | Conductor: William Walton. Singer: Dennis Noble. Orchestra: Royal Liverpool Philharmonic Orchestra. |
| 1 Mar 2020 | Piers Gough | Claudio Monteverdi | "Pur ti miro" (L'incoronazione di Poppea) | Singer: Roberta Invernizzi. Singer: Sonia Prina. Ensemble: Claudiana Ensemble. Conductor: Luca Pianca. |
| 1 Mar 2020 | Piers Gough | Orlando Gough | Perils of Tourism | Ensemble: Man Jumping |
| 1 Mar 2020 | Piers Gough | Handel | Endless pleasure, endless love (Semele) | Singer: Rosemary Joshua. Orchestra: Early Opera Company. Conductor: Christian Curnyn. |
| 1 Mar 2020 | Piers Gough | Truckstop Honeymoon | Truckstop Honeymoon | Ensemble: Truckstop Honeymoon. |
| 1 Mar 2020 | Piers Gough | Ravel | Daphnis and Chloe | Orchestra: Los Angeles Philharmonic. Conductor: Charles Dutoit. |
| 1 Mar 2020 | Piers Gough | Paulo Vinicius | "Blue in the flame" | km_ Tanya Wells. Ensemble: Seven Eyes. |
| 15 Mar 2020 | Isabel Allende | W. A. Mozart | Flute Concerto No. 1 in G major (2nd movement: Adagio) | Performer: Jean-Pierre Rampal, orchestra: Israel Philharmonic Orchestra, conductor: Zubin Mehta |
| 15 Mar 2020 | Isabel Allende | Víctor Jara | "Te Recuerdo Amanda" | Singer: Víctor Jara. |
| 15 Mar 2020 | Isabel Allende | Tomaso Giovanni Albinoni | Oboe Concerto in D minor, Op. 9, No. 2 (2nd movement: Adagio) | Performer: Anthony Camden. Orchestra: London Virtuosi. Conductor: John Georgiadis. |
| 15 Mar 2020 | Isabel Allende | Traditional music | "Si me quieres escribir" | Performer: Rolando Alarcón. |
| 15 Mar 2020 | Isabel Allende | Vivaldi | "Spring" (The Four Seasons) | Performer: Rachel Podger. Ensemble: Brecon Baroque. |
| 15 Mar 2020 | Isabel Allende | Gonzalo Roig | "Quiereme Mucho" | Singer: Plácido Domingo. |
| 15 Mar 2020 | Isabel Allende | Violeta Parra | "Gracias a la vida" | Performer: Mercedes Sosa. |
| 22 Mar 2020 | Stephen Schwartz | Leonard Bernstein | "World without end" (Mass) | Performer: Mary Bracken Phillips. Performer: Leonard Bernstein. |
| 22 Mar 2020 | Stephen Schwartz | Beethoven | Sonata in C♯ minor (Moonlight) (1st movement: Adagio) | Performer: Jonathan Biss |
| 22 Mar 2020 | Stephen Schwartz | J. S. Bach | Brandenburg Concerto No. 6 in B♭ major (3rd movement: Allegro) | Orchestra: Marlboro Festival Orchestra, conductor: Pau Casals |
| 22 Mar 2020 | Stephen Schwartz | Aaron Copland | Appalachian Spring (excerpt) | Orchestra: New York Philharmonic, conductor: Leonard Bernstein |
| 22 Mar 2020 | Stephen Schwartz | Carl Orff | "O Fortuna" (Carmina Burana) | Orchestra: Atlanta Symphony Orchestra. Choir: Atlanta Symphony Chorus. Conductor: Donald Runnicles. |
| 22 Mar 2020 | Stephen Schwartz | Stephen Schwartz | "No One Mourns the Wicked" (Wicked) | Performer: Cristy Candler. Performer: Kristin Chenoweth. Performer: Jan Neuberger. Performer: Sean McCourt. |
| 22 Mar 2020 | Stephen Schwartz | Rachmaninov | Prelude in C♯ minor, Op. 3, No. 2 | Performer: Nikolai Lugansky. |
| 22 Mar 2020 | Stephen Schwartz | Giacomo Puccini | "Chi il ben sogno di Doretta" (La rondine) | Orchestra: English Chamber Orchestra, conductor: Jeffrey Tate, singer: Renée Fleming |
| 5 Apr 2020 | Jools Holland | J. S. Bach | Prelude in B minor (No. 24 from The Well-Tempered Clavier, book 1) | Performer: Edwin Fischer |
| 5 Apr 2020 | Jools Holland | J. S. Bach | Prelude in B♭ minor (No. 22 from The Well-Tempered Clavier, book 1) | Performer: Friedrich Gulda |
| 5 Apr 2020 | Jools Holland | Jean-Paul-Égide Martini | "Plaisir d'amour" | Performer: Tito Schipa. |
| 5 Apr 2020 | Jools Holland | Richard Strauss | Arabella (excerpt) | Singer: Elisabeth Schwarzkopf. Singer: Josef Metternich. Orchestra: Philharmonia Orchestra. Conductor: Lovro von Matačić. |
| 5 Apr 2020 | Jools Holland | Edwin T. Astley | The World Ten Times Over | Performer: Edwin T. Astley. |
| 5 Apr 2020 | Jools Holland | Felix Mendelssohn | Greeting, Op. 63, No. 3 | Performer: Gerald Moore. Singer: Kathleen Ferrier. Singer: Isobel Baillie. |
| 5 Apr 2020 | Jools Holland | Olivier Messiaen | "Regard du Pere" (Vingt Regards sur l'enfant-Jésus) | Performer: Yvonne Loriod. |
| 5 Apr 2020 | Jools Holland | Wagner | "Pilgrim's Chorus" (Tannhauser) | Performer: Donald Lambert. Music arranger: Donald Lambert. |
| 12 Apr 2020 | Chris Watson | Ánde Somby | Gadni – Spirit of the Mountain | |
| 12 Apr 2020 | Chris Watson | Jean Sibelius | Tapiola | Orchestra: Lahti Symphony Orchestra. Conductor: Osmo Vänskä. |
| 12 Apr 2020 | Chris Watson | Hildur Guðnadóttir | Folk faer andlit | |
| 12 Apr 2020 | Chris Watson | Pierre Schaeffer | Etude aux Chemins de Fer | |
| 12 Apr 2020 | Chris Watson | Britten | Cello Suite No. 2 (5th movement: Chaconne) | Performer: Mstislav Leopoldovich Rostropovich. |
| 12 Apr 2020 | Chris Watson | Adrian Corker | "I have the package" | |
| 12 Apr 2020 | Chris Watson | Claire M Singer | Solas | |
| 26 Apr 2020 | John Dyson | Beethoven | Piano Concerto No. 1 in C major (1st movement: Allegro con brio) | Performer: Géza Anda. Orchestra: Salzburg Camerata. |
| 26 Apr 2020 | John Dyson | Leonard Bernstein | Chichester Psalms (1st movement, excerpt) | Orchestra: Israel Philharmonic Orchestra. Choir: Vienna Youth Choir. Conductor: Leonard Bernstein. |
| 26 Apr 2020 | John Dyson | Schubert | Fantasia in F minor, D 940 | Performers: Paul Badura-Skoda, Jörg Demus |
| 26 Apr 2020 | John Dyson | J. S. Bach | Goldberg Variations (opening) | Performer: Sir András Schiff |
| 26 Apr 2020 | John Dyson | Verdi | Otello (act 1, finale) | Singers: Margaret Price, Carlo Cossutta, orchestra: Vienna Philharmonic, conductor: Georg Solti |
| 26 Apr 2020 | John Dyson | Richard Strauss | "Im Abendrot" (Four Last Songs) | Singer: Karita Mattila. Orchestra: Berlin Philharmonic Orchestra. Conductor: Claudio Abbado. |
| 26 Apr 2020 | John Dyson | John Lennon and Paul McCartney | "Hey Jude" | Ensemble: The Beatles. |
| 10 May 2020 | Andrew O'Hagan | Jules Massenet | "Meditation" (Thais) | Performer: Nigel Kennedy. Orchestra: National Philharmonic Orchestra. Conductor: Richard Bonynge. |
| 10 May 2020 | Andrew O'Hagan | Trad. | "Ca' the Yowes" | Music arranger: Ralph Vaughan Williams. Singer: Ian Partridge. Choir: London Madrigal Singers. Conductor: Christopher Bishop. |
| 10 May 2020 | Andrew O'Hagan | Edward Elgar | Sospiri | Orchestra: Sinfonia of London. Conductor: John Barbirolli. |
| 10 May 2020 | Andrew O'Hagan | John Field | Nocturne No. 9 in E♭ major | Performer: Micheál O'Rourke. |
| 10 May 2020 | Andrew O'Hagan | June Christy | Something Cool | |
| 10 May 2020 | Andrew O'Hagan | Frank Bridge | "Music, When Soft Voices Die" | Choir: Tenebrae. Conductor: Nigel Short. |
| 10 May 2020 | Andrew O'Hagan | Ludwig van Beethoven | "Mir ist so wunderbar" (Fidelio) | Orchestra: Lucerne Festival Orchestra. Conductor: Claudio Abbado. |
| 24 May 2020 | Brian Greene | Johannes Brahms | Rhapsody in G minor, Op. 79, No. 2 | Performer: Radu Lupu. |
| 24 May 2020 | Brian Greene | Cappy Barra Boys Harmonica Quartet | Rockin' in the Rockies | |
| 24 May 2020 | Brian Greene | Ludwig van Beethoven | Symphony No. 7 in A major, Op. 92 (2nd movement: Allegretto) | Orchestra: Academy of St Martin in the Fields. Conductor: Joshua Bell |
| 24 May 2020 | Brian Greene | J. S. Bach | Chaconne in D minor (from Partita for Violin No. 2) | Performer: Joshua Bell, music arranger: Felix Mendelssohn, orchestrator: Julian Milone, orchestra: Academy of St Martin in the Fields |
| 24 May 2020 | Brian Greene | Jeff Beal | "Light Falls" | |
| 24 May 2020 | Brian Greene | J. S. Bach | Goldberg Variations (Variation No. 25) | Performer: Glenn Gould |
| 24 May 2020 | Brian Greene | Philip Glass | Icarus at the Edge of Time | Orchestra: Orchestra of St. Luke's. Conductor: Brad Lubman. |
| 24 May 2020 | Brian Greene | Alan Greene | "Sometimes it's Good to Cry" | Performer: Roberta Cooper. Performer: Carmel Lowenthal. |
| 31 May 2020 | Patricia Wiltshire | Frédéric Chopin | Berceuse in D♭ major, Op. 57 | Performer: Arthur Rubinstein. |
| 31 May 2020 | Patricia Wiltshire | Joseph Parry | "Myfanwy" | Choir: Treorchy Male Voice Choir. |
| 31 May 2020 | Patricia Wiltshire | Alphonse Hasselmans | La Source | Performer: Judy Loman. |
| 31 May 2020 | Patricia Wiltshire | J. S. Bach | Brandenburg Concerto No. 4 (1st movement: Allegro) | Performer: Wendy Carlos. Music arranger: Wendy Carlos |
| 31 May 2020 | Patricia Wiltshire | Aram Khachaturian | "Adagio for Spartacus and Phrygia" (Spartacus) | Orchestra: London Symphony Orchestra. Conductor: Aram Khachaturian. |
| 31 May 2020 | Patricia Wiltshire | Traditional Spanish | "Dame un Poquito de Agua" | Performer: Paco de Lucía. Singer: Camarón de la Isla. |
| 31 May 2020 | Patricia Wiltshire | W. A. Mozart | "Voi che sapete" (from The Marriage of Figaro) | Singer: Cecilia Bartoli |
| 14 Jun 2020 | Peter Stanford | Hildegard von Bingen | O gloriosissimi lux | Choir: Sequentia. Conductor: Benjamin Bagby. |
| 14 Jun 2020 | Peter Stanford | J. S. Bach | Cello Suite in G major (Prelude) | Performer: Jacqueline du Pré |
| 14 Jun 2020 | Peter Stanford | W. A. Mozart | Exsultate, jubilate | Orchestra: Staatskapelle Dresden, conductor: Bernhard Klee, singer: Edith Mathis |
| 14 Jun 2020 | Peter Stanford | Harry Chapin | "Barefoot Boy" | |
| 14 Jun 2020 | Peter Stanford | Giuseppe Tartini | Sonata in G minor (Devil's Trill) (1st movement: Larghetto) | Performer: Andrew Manze. |
| 14 Jun 2020 | Peter Stanford | J. S. Bach | "Give, Oh Give Me Back My Lord" (from St Matthew Passion) | Singer: Stephen Roberts (baritone), orchestra: Thames Chamber Orchestra, conductor: Sir David Willcocks |
| 14 Jun 2020 | Peter Stanford | Richard Rodgers | "You'll Never Walk Alone" | Singer: Jennifer Johnston |
| 28 Jun 2020 | Helen Macdonald | King Henry VIII of England | "Pastime with Good Company" | Choir: Oxford Camerata. Conductor: Jeremy Summerly. |
| 28 Jun 2020 | Helen Macdonald | Igor Stravinsky | The Firebird (excerpt) | Orchestra: Berlin Radio Symphony Orchestra. Conductor: Lorin Maazel. |
| 28 Jun 2020 | Helen Macdonald | Benjamin Britten | String Quartet No. 2 in C major (1st movement: Allegro) | Ensemble: Takács Quartet. |
| 28 Jun 2020 | Helen Macdonald | Victor Hely-Hutchinson | Carol Symphony (3rd movement: Andante) | Orchestra: City of Prague Philharmonic Orchestra. Conductor: Gavin Sutherland. |
| 28 Jun 2020 | Helen Macdonald | Hanna Tuulikki | Song Thrush | |
| 28 Jun 2020 | Helen Macdonald | Jean Sibelius | Symphony No. 7 in C major (excerpt) | Orchestra: Vienna Philharmonic. Conductor: Leonard Bernstein. |
| 28 Jun 2020 | Helen Macdonald | Jean-Baptiste Lully | Prelude pour la Nuit (Le Triomphe de l'Amour) | Orchestra: Capriccio Stravagante. Conductor: Skip Sempé. |
| 30 Aug 2020 | Brian Moore | Felix Mendelssohn | Overture: The Hebrides (Fingal's Cave) | Orchestra: London Symphony Orchestra. Conductor: Sir John Eliot Gardiner. |
| 30 Aug 2020 | Brian Moore | William James Kirkpatrick | "Will Your Anchor Hold" | Performer: Paul Trepte. Choir: Ely Cathedral Choir. Conductor: Konichi. |
| 30 Aug 2020 | Brian Moore | W. A. Mozart | "Der Hölle Rache" (from The Magic Flute) | Singer: Natalie Dessay, orchestra: Les Arts Florissants, conductor: William Christie |
| 30 Aug 2020 | Brian Moore | W. A. Mozart | Piano Concerto No. 21 in C major (1st movement) | Performer: Yeol Eum Son, orchestra: Academy of St Martin in the Fields, conductor: Neville Marriner |
| 30 Aug 2020 | Brian Moore | Samuel Barber | Adagio for Strings | Orchestra: Bergen Philharmonic Orchestra. Conductor: Andrew Litton |
| 30 Aug 2020 | Brian Moore | Pyotr Ilyich Tchaikovsky | Overture: The Nutcracker | Orchestra: Los Angeles Philharmonic. Conductor: Gustavo Dudamel. |
| 30 Aug 2020 | Brian Moore | Pietro Mascagni | Intermezzo (Cavalleria rusticana) | Orchestra: Dresdner Philharmonie. Conductor: Marek Janowski. |
| 13 Sep 2020 | Anthony David | Ludwig van Beethoven | Symphony No. 9 in D minor (Choral) (Finale) | Orchestra: New York Philharmonic, conductor: Leonard Bernstein |
| 13 Sep 2020 | Anthony David | Dudley Moore | "And the Same to You" | Performer: Dudley Moore Trio |
| 13 Sep 2020 | Anthony David | Claude Debussy | Prélude à l'après-midi d'un faune | Orchestra: Royal Concertgebouw Orchestra, conductor: Bernard Haitink |
| 13 Sep 2020 | Anthony David | Aaron Copland | Quiet City | Orchestra: Nashville Chamber Orchestra, conductor: Paul Gambill |
| 13 Sep 2020 | Anthony David | Joni Mitchell | "Both Sides, Now" | Performer: David Newton |
| 13 Sep 2020 | Anthony David | J. S. Bach | Sonata No. 1 in G minor for violin solo, BWV 1001 (1st movement: Adagio) | Performer: Felix Ayo |
| 13 Sep 2020 | Anthony David | Stephen Sondheim | "I'm Still Here" (Follies) | Performer: Millicent Martin |
| 20 Sep 2020 | Heather Phillipson | Sergei Prokofiev | Peter and the Wolf | Orchestra: Vienna Philharmonic. Conductor: Mario Rossi. Narrator: Boris Karloff. |
| 20 Sep 2020 | Heather Phillipson | W. A. Mozart | Symphony No. 25 in G minor (1st movement: Allegro) | Orchestra: Academy of St Martin in the Fields, conductor: Neville Marriner |
| 20 Sep 2020 | Heather Phillipson | Bad Company UK | "The Nine" | |
| 20 Sep 2020 | Heather Phillipson | Robert Ashley | Perfect Lives | |
| 20 Sep 2020 | Heather Phillipson | Heather Phillipson | "Splashy Phasings" | |
| 20 Sep 2020 | Heather Phillipson | Ludwig van Beethoven | Piano Concerto No. 5 in E♭ major (2nd movement: Adagio) | Performer: Alicia de Larrocha. Orchestra: Los Angeles Philharmonic. Conductor: Zubin Mehta. |
| 20 Sep 2020 | Heather Phillipson | Public Enemy | "Fight the Power" | |
| 20 Sep 2020 | Heather Phillipson | Edvard Grieg | "Fairy Dance" (Lyric Pieces) | Performer: Antonio Pompa-Baldi. |
| 27 Sep 2020 | Jack Klaff | Traditional South African | "Shosholoza" | Ensemble: Rishile Gumboot Dancers of Soweto. |
| 27 Sep 2020 | Jack Klaff | Dmitri Shostakovich | Symphony No. 5 (4th movement: Allegro non troppo) | Orchestra: London Symphony Orchestra. Conductor: Gianandrea Noseda. |
| 27 Sep 2020 | Jack Klaff | Kurt Weill | "Tchaikovsky and Other Russians" (Lady in the Dark) | Performer: Danny Kaye. |
| 27 Sep 2020 | Jack Klaff | Schubert | String Quintet in C, D 956 (2nd movement: Adagio) | Performers: Isaac Stern, Alexander Schneider. Milton Katims, Pau Casals, Paul Tortelier |
| 27 Sep 2020 | Jack Klaff | Bobby McFerrin | "Hoedown" | Performer: Yo‐Yo Ma. Performer: Bobby McFerrin. |
| 27 Sep 2020 | Jack Klaff | Ludwig van Beethoven | String Quartet in C♯ minor, Op. 131 (1st movement: Adagio) | Ensemble: Busch Quartet. |
| 27 Sep 2020 | Jack Klaff | Giuseppe Verdi | "Amami, Alfredo..." (La Traviata) | Singer: Maria Callas. Singer: Giuseppe Di Stefano. Orchestra: La Scala Orchestra, Milan. Conductor: Carlo Maria Giulini. |
| 4 Oct 2020 | Gretchen Gerzina | Henry Purcell | "Welcome, Glorious Morn", Z. 338 (excerpt) | Orchestra: Orchestra of the Age of Enlightenment, choir: The Choir of the Age of Enlightenment, conductor: Nicholas Kraemer |
| 4 Oct 2020 | Gretchen Gerzina | Ludwig van Beethoven | Symphony No. 9 in D minor (4th movement: Presto) | Orchestra: Vienna Symphony, choir: Wiener Singverein, conductor: Philippe Jordan |
| 4 Oct 2020 | Gretchen Gerzina | Ignatius Sancho | Minuet in F major | Ensemble: Afro American Chamber Music Society, conductor: Janise White |
| 4 Oct 2020 | Gretchen Gerzina | Joseph Bologne, Chevalier de Saint-Georges | Violin Concerto in A major (1st movement: Allegro) | Performer: Rachel Barton Pine, orchestra: Encore Chamber Orchestra, conductor: Daniel Hege |
| 4 Oct 2020 | Gretchen Gerzina | The Beatles | "Blackbird" | |
| 4 Oct 2020 | Gretchen Gerzina | Arcangelo Corelli | Concerto Grosso in D major, Op. 6, No. 7 (1st movement: Vivace) | Orchestra: Tafelmusik, conductor: Jeanne Lamon |
| 4 Oct 2020 | Gretchen Gerzina | Léo Delibes | Lakmé ("Flower Duet") | Singers: Joan Sutherland, Jane Berbié, orchestra: Monte-Carlo Philharmonic Orchestra, conductor: Richard Bonynge |
| 4 Oct 2020 | Gretchen Gerzina | Samuel Coleridge-Taylor | "Hiawatha's Departure" (The Song of Hiawatha) | Orchestra: Welsh National Opera Orchestra, conductor: Kenneth Alwyn |
| 25 Oct 2020 | Johny Pitts | James Reese Europe's 369th U.S. Infantry Hell Fighters Band | "Russian Rag" | |
| 25 Oct 2020 | Johny Pitts | Ryuichi Sakamoto | Solari | |
| 25 Oct 2020 | Johny Pitts | Florence Price | Symphony No. 1 (2nd movement: Largo) | Orchestra: Fort Smith Symphony Orchestra. Conductor: John Jeter. |
| 25 Oct 2020 | Johny Pitts | George Gershwin | "Rhapsody in Blue" | Performer: Ralph Grierson. Orchestra: Philharmonia Orchestra. Conductor: James Levine. |
| 25 Oct 2020 | Johny Pitts | Richard Wagner | "Siegfried's Funeral March" (Götterdämmerung) | Orchestra: London Philharmonic Orchestra. Conductor: Klaus Tennstedt. |
| 25 Oct 2020 | Johny Pitts | Antonín Dvořák | Symphony No. 9 (From the New World) (2nd movement: Largo) | Music arranger: Raymond Lefèvre, orchestra: Raymond Lefèvre Orchestra |
| 1 Nov 2020 | Sarah Perry | Paul Hindemith | Viola Sonata, Op. 11, No. 4 (1st movement: Fantasie) | Performer: Nobuko Imai. Performer: Roland Pöntinen. |
| 1 Nov 2020 | Sarah Perry | Ludwig van Beethoven | String Quartet in E♭ major, Op. 127 (1st movement: Maestoso) | Ensemble: Alban Berg Quartett. |
| 1 Nov 2020 | Sarah Perry | George Gershwin | "I Loves You, Porgy" (from Porgy and Bess) | Ensemble: Bill Evans Trio |
| 1 Nov 2020 | Sarah Perry | Johannes Brahms | Intermezzo in B minor, Op. 119, No. 1 | Performer: Anna Scott. |
| 1 Nov 2020 | Sarah Perry | Antonín Dvořák | "Song to the Moon" (Rusalka) | Singer: Emalie Savoy. Orchestra: Brandenburgisches Staatsorchester Frankfurt. Conductor: Matthias Foremny. |
| 1 Nov 2020 | Sarah Perry | Stephen Crowe | "Honeyvoiced Mythweaver" | Performer: Maximilian Ehrhardt. Conductor: Chloe Weiss. |
| 1 Nov 2020 | Sarah Perry | Benedetto Marcello | Concerto in D minor, BWV 974 (2nd movement: Adagio) | Performer: Víkingur Ólafsson (piano). Music arranger: Johann Sebastian Bach |
| 15 Nov 2020 | Mike Brearley | Claudio Monteverdi | "Pur ti miro" (L'Incoronazione di Poppea) | Singer: Sylvia McNair. Singer: Dana Hanchard. Orchestra: English Baroque Soloists. Conductor: Sir John Eliot Gardiner. |
| 15 Nov 2020 | Mike Brearley | W. A. Mozart | Violin Sonata in B♭ major, K. 454 (1st movement: Largo – Allegro) | Performers: Jascha Heifetz (violin), Brooks Smith (piano) |
| 15 Nov 2020 | Mike Brearley | J. S. Bach | Goldberg Variations (excerpts) | Performer: Ralph Kirkpatrick |
| 15 Nov 2020 | Mike Brearley | Ludwig van Beethoven | String Quartet in C♯ minor, Op. 131 (6th movement: Adagio) | Ensemble: Endellion Quartet. |
| 15 Nov 2020 | Mike Brearley | Schubert | Piano Sonata in B♭ major, D 960 (1st movement: Molto moderato) | Performer: Alfred Brendel |
| 15 Nov 2020 | Mike Brearley | Pyotr Ilyich Tchaikovsky | Gremin's aria, Act 3 (from Eugene Onegin) | Singer: Jonathan Lemalu, orchestra: New Zealand Symphony Orchestra, conductor: James Judd |
| 15 Nov 2020 | Mike Brearley | Sir Harrison Birtwistle | Passion Chorale I (Punch and Judy) | Orchestra: London Sinfonietta. Conductor: David Atherton. |
| 29 Nov 2020 | Alexandra Harris | Benjamin Britten | Marsh Flowers (5 Flower Songs) | Choir: RIAS Chamber Choir. Conductor: Justin Doyle. |
| 29 Nov 2020 | Alexandra Harris | Laura Cannell | "Awaken Waken" | |
| 29 Nov 2020 | Alexandra Harris | Schubert | "Gute Nacht" (No. 1 from Winterreise) | Thomas Adès (piano), Ian Bostridge (tenor) |
| 29 Nov 2020 | Alexandra Harris | Pérotin | Alleluia, posui adiutorium | Choir: The Hilliard Ensemble. |
| 29 Nov 2020 | Alexandra Harris | Trad. | "The Cherry Tree Carol" | Ensemble: Anonymous 4. |
| 29 Nov 2020 | Alexandra Harris | Simon Rowland-Jones | String Quartet No. 7 (Flock of Knot) | Ensemble: Carducci String Quartet. |
| 29 Nov 2020 | Alexandra Harris | Thomas Tallis | "Te lucis ante terminum" | Choir: Stile Antico. |
| 13 Dec 2020 | Judith Herrin | Johannes Brahms | Piano Trio in B major, Op. 8 (1st movement: Allegro con brio) | Performer: Isaac Stern. Performer: Pau Casals. Performer: Myra Hess. |
| 13 Dec 2020 | Judith Herrin | Enric Morera | La Santa Espina | Ensemble: La Principal de la Bisbal. |
| 13 Dec 2020 | Judith Herrin | Ludwig van Beethoven | Cello Sonata in C major, Op. 102, No. 1 (1st movement: Andante – Allegro) | Performer: Jacqueline du Pré. Performer: Daniel Barenboim. |
| 13 Dec 2020 | Judith Herrin | W. A. Mozart | Bassoon Concerto in B♭ major, K. 191 (3rd movement: Rondo) | Performer: Stepan Turnovsky, orchestra: Vienna Mozart Academy, conductor: Johannes Wildner |
| 13 Dec 2020 | Judith Herrin | The Doors | "Break On Through" | |
| 13 Dec 2020 | Judith Herrin | Leoš Janáček | Mladi (3rd movement) | Ensemble: Ensemble. |
| 13 Dec 2020 | Judith Herrin | W. A. Mozart | "Tamino halt! ... Tamino mein, o welch ein Glück!" (from The Magic Flute) | Singers: Marlis Petersen, Daniel Behle, orchestra: Akademie für Alte Musik Berlin, conductor: René Jacobs |
| 13 Dec 2020 | Judith Herrin | Cole Porter | "Do I Love You?" | Performer: Ella Fitzgerald. |
| 20 Dec 2020 | Kadiatu Kanneh-Mason | Giuseppe Verdi | Va pensiero (Nabucco) | Choir: Chor der Wiener Staatsoper. Orchestra: Orchester der Wiener Staatsoper. Conductor: Lamberto Gardelli. |
| 20 Dec 2020 | Kadiatu Kanneh-Mason | W. A. Mozart | Benedictus (Requiem in D minor) | Singers: Carolyn Sampson, Marianne Beate Kielland, Makoto Sakurada, Christian Immler, ochestra: Bach Collegium Japan, conductor: Masaaki Suzuki |
| 20 Dec 2020 | Kadiatu Kanneh-Mason | Dmitri Shostakovich | Piano Trio No. 2, Op. 67 (4th movement: Allegretto – Adagio) | Performer: Mischa Maisky. Performer: Gidon Kremer. Performer: Martha Argerich. |
| 20 Dec 2020 | Kadiatu Kanneh-Mason | Schubert | Piano Quintet in A major (Trout) (4th movement: Andantino) | Gerold Huber (piano), Henschel Quartet |
| 20 Dec 2020 | Kadiatu Kanneh-Mason | Samuel Coleridge-Taylor | "Deep River" | Ensemble: Kanneh-Mason Trio. |
| 20 Dec 2020 | Kadiatu Kanneh-Mason | Ludwig van Beethoven | Violin Concerto in D major, Op. 61 (1st movement: Allegro) | Performer: Itzhak Perlman. Orchestra: Berlin Philharmonic Orchestra. Conductor: Daniel Barenboim. |
| 20 Dec 2020 | Kadiatu Kanneh-Mason | Clancy Eccles | Fatty, Fatty | |

== 2021 ==
| Date | Guest | Composer | Title | Performer / Label |
|---|---|---|---|---|
| 3 Jan 2021 | David 'Kid' Jensen | Antonín Dvořák | Symphony No. 9 in E minor (From the New World) (2nd movement: Largo) | Orchestra: Stuttgart Radio Symphony Orchestra, conductor: Sir Roger Norrington |
| 3 Jan 2021 | David 'Kid' Jensen | John Coltrane | My Favorite Things | |
| 3 Jan 2021 | David 'Kid' Jensen | Umberto Giordano | "La Mamma morta" (Andrea Chénier) | Singer: Maria Callas. Orchestra: Philharmonia Orchestra. Conductor: Tullio Serafin. |
| 3 Jan 2021 | David 'Kid' Jensen | Gunnar Thordarson | "It shall be so..." (Ragnheidur) | Singer: Elmar Gilbertsson. Singer: Thora Einarsdottir. |
| 3 Jan 2021 | David 'Kid' Jensen | Antonio Vivaldi | "Summer" (Four Seasons) | Composer: Max Richter. Performer: Daniel Hope. Orchestra: Kammerorchester Berlin. Conductor: André de Ridder. |
| 3 Jan 2021 | David 'Kid' Jensen | Giacomo Puccini | "Ch'ella mi creda" (La Fanciulla del West) | Singer: Jonas Kaufmann. Singer: Massimo Simeoli. Orchestra: Orchestra of the Academy of Santa Cecilia, Rome. Choir: Chorus of the National Academy of Santa Cecilia. Conductor: Sir Antonio Pappano. |
| 3 Jan 2021 | David 'Kid' Jensen | John Tavener | The Protecting Veil | Performer: Maria Kliegel. Orchestra: Ulster Orchestra. Conductor: Takuo Yuasa. |
| 17 Jan 2021 | Nadifa Mohamed | Ahmed Hudeidi | "Uur Hooyo" | |
| 17 Jan 2021 | Nadifa Mohamed | Henry Purcell | "When I am laid in earth" (from Dido and Aeneas) | Ensemble: L'Arpeggiata, director: Christina Pluhar, singer: Raquel Andueza |
| 17 Jan 2021 | Nadifa Mohamed | Giovanni Battista Pergolesi | Stabat Mater Dolorosa | Ensemble: Les Talens Lyriques, director: Christophe Rousset |
| 17 Jan 2021 | Nadifa Mohamed | Dinah Washington and Max Richter | "This Bitter Earth" / "On the Nature of Daylight" | |
| 17 Jan 2021 | Nadifa Mohamed | Ralph Vaughan Williams | The Lark Ascending | Performer: Nicola Benedetti, orchestra: London Philharmonic Orchestra, conductor: Andrew Litton |
| 17 Jan 2021 | Nadifa Mohamed | Taj Mahal and Toumani Diabaté | "Queen Bee" | |
| 17 Jan 2021 | Nadifa Mohamed | George Gershwin | "Bess, You Is My Woman Now" (from Porgy and Bess) | Performers: Louis Armstrong, Ella Fitzgerald |
| 24 Jan 2021 | Jamie Parker | Orlando Gibbons | "The Silver Swan" | Performer: Jamie Parker. |
| 24 Jan 2021 | Jamie Parker | Orlando Gibbons | The Silver Swan | Choir: The Hilliard Ensemble. Conductor: Paul Hillier. |
| 24 Jan 2021 | Jamie Parker | George Gershwin | "Rhapsody in Blue" | Performer: Peter Donohoe. Orchestra: London Sinfonietta. Conductor: Sir Simon Rattle. |
| 24 Jan 2021 | Jamie Parker | Henry Mancini | "Pie in the Face Polka" | |
| 24 Jan 2021 | Jamie Parker | Gerald Finzi | Clarinet Concerto (2nd movement: Adagio) | Performer: Robert Plane. Orchestra: Royal Northern Sinfonia. Conductor: Howard Griffiths. |
| 24 Jan 2021 | Jamie Parker | Arthur Sullivan | Dance a cachucha, fandango, bolero (The Gondoliers) | Choir: D'Oyly Carte Opera Chorus. Orchestra: New Symphony Orchestra. Conductor: Isidore Godfrey. |
| 24 Jan 2021 | Jamie Parker | Angela Morley | Fiver's Vision (Watership Down) | Conductor: Marcus Dods. |
| 24 Jan 2021 | Jamie Parker | Louis Armstrong & His All-Stars | "Sweet Georgia Brown" | |
| 31 Jan 2021 | Rachel Clarke | Ralph Vaughan Williams | The Lark Ascending | Performer: Nigel Kennedy, orchestra: City of Birmingham Symphony Orchestra, conductor: Sir Simon Rattle |
| 31 Jan 2021 | Rachel Clarke | Edward Elgar | "Nimrod" (Enigma Variations, Op. 36) | Orchestra: London Philharmonic Orchestra. Conductor: Daniel Barenboim. |
| 31 Jan 2021 | Rachel Clarke | Jimi Hendrix Experience | "All Along the Watchtower" | |
| 31 Jan 2021 | Rachel Clarke | Pyotr Ilyich Tchaikovsky | Swan Lake (act 1 finale) | Orchestra: Philharmonia Orchestra, conductor: Santtu-Matias Rouvali |
| 31 Jan 2021 | Rachel Clarke | J. S. Bach | Concerto in D minor for Two Violins (2nd movement: Largo) | Violins: Julia Fischer, Alexander Sitkovetsky, orchestra: Academy of St Martin in the Fields |
| 31 Jan 2021 | Rachel Clarke | Two Steps from Hell | Heart of Courage | |
| 14 Feb 2021 | Tim Harford | Benjamin Britten | Serenade for tenor, horn and strings (Prologue – Pastoral) | Performer: Dennis Brain. Orchestra: New Symphony Orchestra. Conductor: Eugene Goossens. Singer: Peter Pears. |
| 14 Feb 2021 | Tim Harford | Brian Eno | Music for Airports | Ensemble: Bang on a Can All-Stars. |
| 14 Feb 2021 | Tim Harford | Arvo Pärt | The Beatitudes | Performer: Daniel Justin. Choir: Leeds Cathedral Choir. Conductor: Thomas Leech. |
| 14 Feb 2021 | Tim Harford | Steve Reich | Electric Counterpoint (3rd movement) | Performer: Sean Shibe. |
| 14 Feb 2021 | Tim Harford | Leoš Janáček | Glagolitic Mass (Introduction) | Orchestra: New York Philharmonic, conductor: Leonard Bernstein |
| 14 Feb 2021 | Tim Harford | Philip Glass | "Knee Play 5" (Einstein on the Beach) | Ensemble: Philip Glass Ensemble. Conductor: Michael Riesman. |
| 14 Feb 2021 | Tim Harford | Ludwig van Beethoven | Symphony No. 9 in D minor, Op. 125 (Choral) (4th movement) | Orchestra: Berlin Philharmonic, conductor: Herbert von Karajan |
| 21 Feb 2021 | Caroline Bird | Sergey Rachmaninov | Cello Sonata in G minor (4th movement: Allegro mosso) | Performer: Alisa Weilerstein. |
| 21 Feb 2021 | Caroline Bird | Alexandre Guilmant | Morceau symphonique, Op. 88 | Performer: Christian Lindberg. Orchestra: Bamberg Symphony Orchestra. Conductor: Leif Segerstam. |
| 21 Feb 2021 | Caroline Bird | Lionel Bart | "It's a Fine Life" (Oliver!) | Performer: Soundtrack. |
| 21 Feb 2021 | Caroline Bird | Billie Holiday | "You've Changed" | |
| 21 Feb 2021 | Caroline Bird | Georges Bizet | "Dat's Love" (Carmen Jones) | Performer: Henry Lewis. Singer: Wilhelmenia Fernandez. |
| 21 Feb 2021 | Caroline Bird | Edward Elgar | "Sea-slumber Song" (Sea Pictures) | Singer: Janet Baker. Orchestra: London Symphony Orchestra. Conductor: John Barbirolli. |
| 21 Feb 2021 | Caroline Bird | Leonard Bernstein | Overture: West Side Story | Orchestra: Orchestra. Conductor: Leonard Bernstein. |
| 28 Feb 2021 | Bill Browder | Georges Bizet | "Votre toast..." (Toreador Song – Carmen) | Orchestra: Orchestre national du Capitole de Toulouse, singer: Thomas Hampson |
| 28 Feb 2021 | Bill Browder | Antonio Vivaldi | Flute Concerto in G minor (La Notte) | Performer: Bruno Cavallo. Orchestra: La Scala Philharmonic. Conductor: Riccardo Muti. |
| 28 Feb 2021 | Bill Browder | Giuseppe Verdi | "Va, Pensiero..." (Chorus of the Hebrew Slaves, Nabucco) | Choir: Berlin Opera Chorus. Orchestra: German Opera Berlin Orchestra. Conductor: Giuseppe Sinopoli. |
| 28 Feb 2021 | Bill Browder | Giacomo Puccini | "Un bel di vedremo" (Madama Butterfly) | Singer: Angela Gheorghiu. Orchestra: Orchestra of the Academy of Santa Cecilia, Rome. Conductor: Sir Antonio Pappano. |
| 28 Feb 2021 | Bill Browder | Gyorgy Sviridov | Troika and Waltz (Snow Storm – music for the film) | Orchestra: Moscow Radio Symphony Orchestra. Conductor: Vladimir Fedoseyev. |
| 28 Feb 2021 | Bill Browder | Giuseppe Verdi | "Libiamo ne' lieti calici" (La traviata) | Singers: Montserrat Caballé, Carlo Bergonzi, orchestra: Orchestra della RCA Italiana |
| 28 Feb 2021 | Bill Browder | Trad. | "Amazing Grace" | Orchestra: Royal Philharmonic Orchestra. Conductor: Alexander Gibson. Singer: Jessye Norman |
| 14 Mar 2021 | Sean Scully | Johannes Brahms | Cello Sonata No. 1 in E minor (1st movement: Allegro) | Performer: Lynn Harrell. Performer: Vladimir Ashkenazy. |
| 14 Mar 2021 | Sean Scully | Lykke Li | "Unchained Melody" | |
| 14 Mar 2021 | Sean Scully | Schubert | String Quintet in C major, D 956 (2nd movement: Adagio) | Aviv String Quartet, Amit Peled (extra cello) |
| 14 Mar 2021 | Sean Scully | Zoltán Kodály | Sonata for solo cello (1st movement: Allegro) | Performer: János Starker. |
| 14 Mar 2021 | Sean Scully | Béla Bartók | String Quartet No. 1 (1st movement: Lento) | Ensemble: Emerson String Quartet. |
| 14 Mar 2021 | Sean Scully | Ludwig van Beethoven | Symphony No. 6 in F major, Op. 68 (1st movement: Allegro) | Orchestra: Slovenská filharmónia. Conductor: Bystrík Režucha. |
| 14 Mar 2021 | Sean Scully | The Jive Five | "My True Story" | |
| 21 Mar 2021 | James Rebanks | Yann Tiersen | Nursery Rhyme of Another Summer: The Afternoon (Amelie) | |
| 21 Mar 2021 | James Rebanks | Sergey Rachmaninov | Piano Concerto No. 2 in C minor, Op. 18 (2nd movement) | Performer: Valentina Lisitsa. Orchestra: London Symphony Orchestra. Conductor: Michael Francis. |
| 21 Mar 2021 | James Rebanks | John Barry | John Dunbar Theme (Dances With Wolves) | |
| 21 Mar 2021 | James Rebanks | Samuel Barber | Knoxville: Summer of 1915 | Singer: Dawn Upshaw. Orchestra: Orchestra of St. Luke's. Conductor: David Zinman. |
| 21 Mar 2021 | James Rebanks | John Williams | Schindler's List (Theme) | Performer: Itzhak Perlman. Orchestra: Boston Symphony Orchestra. |
| 21 Mar 2021 | James Rebanks | Michael Nyman | "The Heart Asks Pleasure First" (The Piano) | |
| 21 Mar 2021 | James Rebanks | Jerome Moross | The Big Country | |
| 4 Apr 2021 | Sister Teresa Keswick | Plainchant | Salve Mater Misericordiae | Choir: Schola Cantorum of Cardinal Vaughan Memorial School. Conductor: Scott Price. |
| 4 Apr 2021 | Sister Teresa Keswick | Ludwig van Beethoven | Bagatelle in A minor – "Für Elise" | Performer: Paul Lewis. |
| 4 Apr 2021 | Sister Teresa Keswick | George Frideric Handel | Dead March (Saul) | Orchestra: Orchestra of The Sixteen. Conductor: Harry Christophers |
| 4 Apr 2021 | Sister Teresa Keswick | Clement Jacob | "Au milieu de silence" (Psalm 18) | Choir: Monks of l'Abbaye d'en Calcat. |
| 4 Apr 2021 | Sister Teresa Keswick | Simon & Garfunkel | "The Sound of Silence" | |
| 4 Apr 2021 | Sister Teresa Keswick | Giuseppe Verdi | "Libiamo ne' lieti calici" (from La traviata, Act 1) | Singera: Ileana Cotrubaș, Plácido Domingo, orchestra: Bavarian State Opera Orchestra, conductor: Carlos Kleiber |
| 4 Apr 2021 | Sister Teresa Keswick | Johann Strauss II | "The Blue Danube" – waltz | Orchestra: Royal Concertgebouw Orchestra Amsterdam, conductor: Nikolaus Harnoncourt |
| 4 Apr 2021 | Sister Teresa Keswick | J. S. Bach | "Et resurrexit" (from Mass in B minor) | Ensemble: Concerto Copenhagen, conductor: Lars Ulrik Mortensen |
| 11 Apr 2021 | Kieran Hodgson | Max Bruch | Double Concerto, version for violin and viola | Viola: Yuri Bashmet, violin: Viktor Tretiakov, London Symphony Orchestra, conductor: Neeme Järvi |
| 11 Apr 2021 | Kieran Hodgson | Alfred Schnittke | Concerto for Choir (4th movement) | Choir: State Chamber Choir of Moscow Conservatory. Conductor: Valery Kuzmich Polyansky. |
| 11 Apr 2021 | Kieran Hodgson | Leonard Bernstein | "America" (West Side Story) | Performer: Rita Moreno. |
| 11 Apr 2021 | Kieran Hodgson | Arnold Schoenberg | Gurre-Lieder (excerpts) | Singer: Thomas Quasthoff. Orchestra: Berlin Philharmonic Orchestra. Conductor: Sir Simon Rattle. |
| 11 Apr 2021 | Kieran Hodgson | Mica Levi | Jackie – film music (intro) | |
| 11 Apr 2021 | Kieran Hodgson | Wim Sonneveld | "Margootje" | |
| 18 Apr 2021 | Margaret Heffernan | Antonio Vivaldi | "Sol da te" (Orlando furioso) | Singer: Cecilia Bartoli. Ensemble: Ensemble Matheus. Conductor: Jean-Christophe Spinosi. |
| 18 Apr 2021 | Margaret Heffernan | Miles Davis | "So What" | |
| 18 Apr 2021 | Margaret Heffernan | Nick Bicât | "In paradisum" (Requiem) | Ensemble: Taverner Consort. Conductor: Andrew Parrott. |
| 18 Apr 2021 | Margaret Heffernan | Claudio Monteverdi | Il ritorno d'Ulisse in patria – Act 1 | Performer: Frederica von Stade as Penelope, London Philharmonic Orchestra, conductor: Raymond Leppard |
| 18 Apr 2021 | Margaret Heffernan | Anthony Burgess | Blooms of Dublin | Narrator: Anita Reeves. Singer: Alison Hargan. Orchestra: RTÉ Concert Orchestra. Conductor: Proinnsías Ó Duinn. |
| 18 Apr 2021 | Margaret Heffernan | Ludwig van Beethoven | Symphony No. 7 in A major, Op. 92 (2nd movement: Allegretto) | Orchestra: Amsterdam Royal Concertgebouw Orchestra. Conductor: Bernard Haitink. |
| 18 Apr 2021 | Margaret Heffernan | William Brittelle | Amid the Dinosaurs | Ensemble: Roomful of Teeth. |
| 25 Apr 2021 | James Shapiro | Thomas Morley | "It was a lover and his lass" | Singer: Barbara BonneyPerformer: Jacob Heringman. |
| 25 Apr 2021 | James Shapiro | W. A. Mozart | Horn Concerto No. 3 in E♭ major, K. 447 (1st movement: Allegro) | Performer: Dennis Brain, orchestra: Philharmonia Orchestra, conductor: Herbert von Karajan |
| 25 Apr 2021 | James Shapiro | Felix Mendelssohn | Overture: A Midsummer Night's Dream | Orchestra: City of Birmingham Symphony Orchestra. Conductor: Edward Gardner. |
| 25 Apr 2021 | James Shapiro | Duke Ellington | Such Sweet Thunder | |
| 25 Apr 2021 | James Shapiro | Ilona Sekacz | Procession and Chant (King Lear – incidental music) | Performer: Jan Winstone, ensemble: Royal Shakespeare Wind Ensemble |
| 25 Apr 2021 | James Shapiro | Cole Porter | "Brush Up Your Shakespeare" (Kiss Me Kate) | Performer: Keenan Wynn. Performer: James Whitmore. |
| 25 Apr 2021 | James Shapiro | Fairport Convention | Farewell, Farewell | |
| 2 May 2021 | Camilla Pang | Michael Nyman | "The Heart Asks Pleasure First" (from The Piano) | Ensemble: Michael Nyman Band |
| 2 May 2021 | Camilla Pang | Anton Bruckner | Christus factus est | Choir: Polyphony, conductor: Stephen Layton |
| 2 May 2021 | Camilla Pang | Hubert Parry | "I was glad" | Ensemble: Gabrieli Consort & Players, conductor: Paul McCreesh |
| 2 May 2021 | Camilla Pang | William Byrd | "Ave verum corpus" | Choir: Stile Antico |
| 2 May 2021 | Camilla Pang | Claude Debussy | Clair de lune | Performer: Alice Sara Ott |
| 2 May 2021 | Camilla Pang | Charles‐François Gounod | "Ave Maria" | Performers: Yo-Yo Ma (cello), Kathryn Stott (piano) |
| 2 May 2021 | Camilla Pang | Massive Attack | "Teardrop" | |
| 9 May 2021 | George Szirtes | Hector Berlioz | Dies Irae (Grande Messe des Morts) | Orchestra: City of Birmingham Symphony Orchestra. Conductor: Louis Frémaux. Choir: CBSO Chorus. |
| 9 May 2021 | George Szirtes | Béla Bartók | 6 Romanian Folk Dances | Performer: David Oistrakh. Performer: Inna Kollegorskaya. |
| 9 May 2021 | George Szirtes | Maurice Ravel | String Quartet in F major (2nd movement: Assez vif – très rythmé) | Ensemble: Ébène Quartet. |
| 9 May 2021 | George Szirtes | Richard Strauss | Fruhling (4 Last Songs) | Singer: Renée Fleming. Orchestra: Houston Symphony. Conductor: Christoph Eschenbach. |
| 9 May 2021 | George Szirtes | J. S. Bach | Chaconne (from Partita No. 2 in D minor) | Performer: Hilary Hahn |
| 9 May 2021 | George Szirtes | Thomas Tallis | "Spem in Alium" | Choir: Cardinall's Musick. Conductor: Andrew Carwood. |
| 9 May 2021 | George Szirtes | Skip James | "Devil got my woman" | |
| 16 May 2021 | Helen Macdonald | King Henry VIII of England | Pastime with Good Company | Choir: Oxford Camerata. Conductor: Jeremy Summerly. |
| 16 May 2021 | Helen Macdonald | Igor Stravinsky | The Firebird (excerpt) | Orchestra: Berlin Radio Symphony Orchestra. Conductor: Lorin Maazel. |
| 16 May 2021 | Helen Macdonald | Benjamin Britten | String Quartet No. 2 in C major (1st movement: Allegro) | Ensemble: Takács Quartet. |
| 16 May 2021 | Helen Macdonald | Victor Hely-Hutchinson | Carol Symphony (3rd movement: Andante) | Orchestra: City of Prague Philharmonic Orchestra. Conductor: Gavin Sutherland. |
| 16 May 2021 | Helen Macdonald | Hanna Tuulikki | Song Thrush | |
| 16 May 2021 | Helen Macdonald | Jean Sibelius | Symphony No. 7 in C major (excerpt) | Orchestra: Vienna Philharmonic. Conductor: Leonard Bernstein. |
| 16 May 2021 | Helen Macdonald | Jean‐Baptiste Lully | "Prelude pour la Nuit" (Le Triomphe de l'Amour) | Orchestra: Capriccio Stravagante. Conductor: Skip Sempé. |
| 23 May 2021 | Zandra Rhodes | W. A. Mozart | "Der Hölle Rache" (from The Magic Flute) | Singer: Edda Moser, orchestra: Bavarian State Opera Orchestra, conductor: Wolfgang Sawallisch |
| 23 May 2021 | Zandra Rhodes | Georges Bizet | "Au fond du temple saint" (The Pearl Fishers) | Singer: Rolando Villazón. Singer: Ildar Abdrazakov. Orchestra: Metropolitan Opera Orchestra. Conductor: Yannick Nézet‐Séguin. |
| 23 May 2021 | Zandra Rhodes | The Beatles | "Strawberry Fields Forever" | |
| 23 May 2021 | Zandra Rhodes | Joseph Canteloube | "Bailero" (Songs of the Auvergne) | Singer: Kate Royal. Orchestra: Academy of St Martin in the Fields. Conductor: Edward Gardner |
| 23 May 2021 | Zandra Rhodes | Giuseppe Verdi | "Gloria all' Egitto" (Aida) | Performer: Orchestra dell'Academia nazionale di Santa Cecilia. |
| 23 May 2021 | Zandra Rhodes | Maurice Ravel | "Bolero" | Orchestra: Berlin Philharmonic Orchestra. Conductor: Pierre Boulez. |
| 23 May 2021 | Zandra Rhodes | Giacomo Puccini | "Gira la cote" (Turandot) | Orchestra: London Philharmonic Orchestra. Conductor: Zubin Mehta. Choir: The John Alldis Choir. |
| 30 May 2021 | Laura Cumming | Frédéric Chopin | Nocturne in C♯ minor, Op. 27, No. 1 | Performer: Vladimir Ashkenazy. |
| 30 May 2021 | Laura Cumming | Ishbel MacAskill | Gradh Geal Mo Chridh (Fair Love of My Heart) | |
| 30 May 2021 | Laura Cumming | Federico Moreno Torroba | Fandanguillo (Suite Castellana) | Performer: Andrés Segovia. |
| 30 May 2021 | Laura Cumming | J. S. Bach | Prelude (from Cello Suite in G major, BWV 1007) | Performer: Mischa Maisky |
| 30 May 2021 | Laura Cumming | Dmitri Shostakovich | Piano Concerto No. 2 in F (2nd movement: Andante) | Performer: Dmitri Shostakovich. Orchestra: French National Radio Orchestra. Conductor: André Cluytens. |
| 30 May 2021 | Laura Cumming | W. A. Mozart | "Laudate Dominum" (from Vespers, K. 339) | Bath Festival Orchestra, conductor: Yehudi Menuhin, singer: Victoria de los Ángeles |
| 30 May 2021 | Laura Cumming | Talking Heads | "(Nothing But) Flowers" | |
| 06 Jun 2021 | Anya Hurlbert | J. S. Bach | Prelude and Fugue in B♭ minor (from The Well-Tempered Clavier, book 1) | Performer: Sir András Schiff |
| 06 Jun 2021 | Anya Hurlbert | Alexander Borodin | String Quartet No. 2 in D major (2nd movement: Scherzo) | Ensemble: Lindsay String Quartet |
| 06 Jun 2021 | Anya Hurlbert | Schubert | "Die böse Farbe" (No. 17 from Die schöne Müllerin) | Jan Eyron (piano), Nicolai Gedda (tenor) |
| 06 Jun 2021 | Anya Hurlbert | Thea Musgrave | Green | Ensemble: Scottish Ensemble, conductor: Jonathan Morton |
| 06 Jun 2021 | Anya Hurlbert | Elisabeth Lutyens | Six Tempi (I–III) | Ensemble: Jane's Minstrels, conductor: Roger Montgomery |
| 06 Jun 2021 | Anya Hurlbert | Jerry Jeff Walker | "Up Against the Wall Redneck Mother" | |
| 06 Jun 2021 | Anya Hurlbert | Ludwig van Beethoven | Piano Sonata in C, Op. 53 (Waldstein) (1st movement: Allegro) | Performer: Alfred Brendel |
| 20 Jun 2021 | Natalie Haynes | Henry Purcell | "When I am laid in earth" (Dido and Aeneas) | Singer: Joyce DiDonato. Ensemble: Il Pomo d'Oro. Conductor: Maxim Emelyanychev. |
| 20 Jun 2021 | Natalie Haynes | Edward Elgar | "Serious Doll" (Nursery Suite) | Orchestra: New Zealand Symphony Orchestra. Conductor: James Judd. |
| 20 Jun 2021 | Natalie Haynes | Calliope Tsoupaki | Medea – melodrama for 8 instruments | Ensemble: MAE Ensemble. |
| 20 Jun 2021 | Natalie Haynes | Ennio Morricone | "Gabriel's Oboe" (The Mission) | Orchestra: The City of Prague Philharmonic Orchestra. Conductor: Paul Bateman. |
| 20 Jun 2021 | Natalie Haynes | Lin‐Manuel Miranda | Satisfied (Hamilton) | Performer: Renée Elise Goldsberry. |
| 20 Jun 2021 | Natalie Haynes | Annelies Van Parys | Phrases V | Ensemble: Contemporary Music Society of Quebec. Conductor: Walter Boudreau. |
| 20 Jun 2021 | Natalie Haynes | Cole Porter | "So In Love" | Performer: Ella Fitzgerald. |
| 27 Jun 2021 | Alastair Campbell | Traditional Scottish | Lament for the old sword – pibroch | Performer: Don “Magic” Juan. |
| 27 Jun 2021 | Alastair Campbell | Jacques Brel | "Quand on n'a que l'amour" | |
| 27 Jun 2021 | Alastair Campbell | Giuseppe Verdi | Brindisi (La Traviata) | Singer: Pilar Lorengar. Singer: Giacomo Aragall. Orchestra: Orchestra of the Deutsche Oper Berlin. Conductor: Lorin Maazel. |
| 27 Jun 2021 | Alastair Campbell | Wolfgang Amadeus Mozart | Credo (Mass in C minor) | Orchestra: London Symphony Orchestra. Conductor: Colin Davis. |
| 27 Jun 2021 | Alastair Campbell | Franz Schubert | Impromptu in G♭ major, D.899, No. 3 | Performer: Imogen Cooper |
| 27 Jun 2021 | Alastair Campbell | Giacomo Puccini | "Un bel di" (Madame Butterfly) | Singer: Ermonela Jaho. Orchestra: Valenciana Community Orchestra. Conductor: Andrea Battistoni. |
| 27 Jun 2021 | Alastair Campbell | Christian Sinding | The Rustle of Spring | Performer: Joseph Cooper. |
| 4 Jul 2021 | Veronica O'Keane | Johann Sebastian Bach | Prelude (Cello Suite No. 1 in G major) | Performer: Alban Gerhardt. |
| 4 Jul 2021 | Veronica O'Keane | John Lennon | "Imagine" | |
| 4 Jul 2021 | Veronica O'Keane | Ludwig van Beethoven | "Kyrie" (Missa Solemnis) | Singer: Heather Harper. Singer: Janet Baker. Singer: Robert Tear. Singer: Hans Sotin. Orchestra: Philharmonia Orchestra. Conductor: Carlo Maria Giulini. |
| 4 Jul 2021 | Veronica O'Keane | Giacomo Puccini | "O mio babbino caro" (Gianni Schicchi) | Singer: Maria Callas. Orchestra: Philharmonia Orchestra. Conductor: Tullio Serafin. |
| 4 Jul 2021 | Veronica O'Keane | Luke Kelly | "On Raglan Road" | |
| 4 Jul 2021 | Veronica O'Keane | Philip Glass | The Hours | |
| 4 Jul 2021 | Veronica O'Keane | Sharon Shannon | "Blackbird" | |
| 18 Jul 2021 | Carole Boyd | Ralph Vaughan Williams | The Wasps – Overture | Orchestra: Hallé. Conductor: Sir Mark Elder. |
| 18 Jul 2021 | Carole Boyd | William Walton | "This Day is Called the Feast of Crispian..." (Henry V) | Orchestra: Philharmonia Orchestra. Conductor: William Walton. |
| 18 Jul 2021 | Carole Boyd | Aaron Copland | "Hoe-Down" (Rodeo) | Orchestra: BBC Philharmonic Orchestra. Conductor: John Wilson. |
| 18 Jul 2021 | Carole Boyd | Joseph Canteloube | "Trois Bourrees" (Songs of the Auvergne) | Singer: Jill Gomez. Orchestra: Royal Liverpool Philharmonic Orchestra. Conductor: Vernon Handley. |
| 18 Jul 2021 | Carole Boyd | Morten Lauridsen | O Magnum Mysterium | Ensemble: Chamber Choir of Europe. Conductor: Nicol Matt. |
| 18 Jul 2021 | Carole Boyd | Claude Debussy | Pour invoquer Pan (6 Epigraphes antiques) | Ensemble: Nicola & Alexandra Bibby. |
| 25 Jul 2021 | Michio Kaku | Giacomo Puccini | Mi chiamano Mimi (La Bohème) | Singer: Leontyne Price. Orchestra: New Philharmonia Orchestra. Conductor: Sir Edward Downes. |
| 25 Jul 2021 | Michio Kaku | Franz Liszt | Les Preludes | Orchestra: BBC Philharmonic Orchestra. Conductor: Gianandrea Noseda. |
| 25 Jul 2021 | Michio Kaku | Jeremiah Clarke | Trumpet Tune (Prince of Denmark's March) | Performer: Ole Edvard Antonsen. Performer: Wayne Marshall. |
| 25 Jul 2021 | Michio Kaku | George Frideric Handel | Hallelujah Chorus (Messiah) | Choir: RIAS Chamber Choir. Ensemble: Academy for Ancient Music Berlin. Conductor: Justin Doyle. |
| 25 Jul 2021 | Michio Kaku | Henry Purcell | Martial Air (Trumpet Tunes) | Ensemble: New England Brass Ensemble. |
| 25 Jul 2021 | Michio Kaku | Modest Mussorgsky | Promenade – Gnomus (Pictures at an Exhibition) | Music arranger: Maurice Ravel. Orchestra: Ukraine National Symphony Orchestra. Conductor: Theodore Kuchar. |
| 5 Sep 2021 | Peggy Seeger | Peggy Seeger | 2The Puzzle2 | |
| 5 Sep 2021 | Peggy Seeger | Ruth Crawford Seeger | Piano Study in Mixed Accents | Performer: Joseph Bloch. |
| 5 Sep 2021 | Peggy Seeger | Russian Orthodox Chant | "It is meet and right" [Znamenny chant] | Choir: Orthodox Singers Male Choir. Conductor: Valery Petrov. |
| 5 Sep 2021 | Peggy Seeger | Nassau String Band | "Abaco is a Pretty Place" | |
| 5 Sep 2021 | Peggy Seeger | Secret Garden | Adagio | |
| 5 Sep 2021 | Peggy Seeger | In Acchord | "Istanbul" | |
| 5 Sep 2021 | Peggy Seeger | Wolfgang Amadeus Mozart | Clarinet Concerto in A major, K.622 (2nd movement: Adagio) | Performer: Emma Johnson. Orchestra: English Chamber Orchestra. Conductor: Raymond Leppard. |
| 12 Sep 2021 | Helena Attlee | Moishe's Bagel | Svanetia's theme (Salt for Svanetia) | |
| 12 Sep 2021 | Helena Attlee | Max Bruch | Violin Concerto No. 1 in G minor (1st movement) | Performer: Nikolaj Szeps-Znaider. |
| 12 Sep 2021 | Helena Attlee | Traditional Italian | La Verbena | |
| 12 Sep 2021 | Helena Attlee | Niccolò Paganini | Violin Concerto no. 2 in B minor (3rd movement: Rondo) | Performer: Philippe Quint. Performer: Dmitriy Cogan. Music arranger: Fritz Kreisler. |
| 12 Sep 2021 | Helena Attlee | Matile Politi | Amuninni | |
| 12 Sep 2021 | Helena Attlee | Jean Sibelius | Violin Concerto in D minor (1st movement) | Performer: Anne‐Sophie Mutter. Orchestra: Staatskapelle Dresden. Conductor: André Previn. |
| 12 Sep 2021 | Helena Attlee | Anthony Newley | "Feeling Good" | Performer: Nina Simone. |
| 19 Sep 2021 | Francesca Stavrakopoulou | George Frideric Handel | "My vengeance awakes me" (Athalia) | Singer: Elisabeth Scholl. Orchestra: Barockorchester Frankfurt. Conductor: Joachim Carlos Martini. |
| 19 Sep 2021 | Francesca Stavrakopoulou | Billy Joel | "This Night" | |
| 19 Sep 2021 | Francesca Stavrakopoulou | Ludwig van Beethoven | Piano Sonata in C minor, Op. 13 (Pathetique) (2nd movement: Adagio Cantabile) | Performer: Igor Levit. |
| 19 Sep 2021 | Francesca Stavrakopoulou | Camille Saint‐Saëns | Bacchanale (Samson and Delilah) | Orchestra: Utah Symphony. Conductor: Thierry Fischer. |
| 19 Sep 2021 | Francesca Stavrakopoulou | Kinan Abou-afach | Petra I | |
| 19 Sep 2021 | Francesca Stavrakopoulou | Thomas Tallis | Spem in alium | Choir: I Fagiolini. Conductor: Robert Hollingworth. |
| 19 Sep 2021 | Francesca Stavrakopoulou | Edward Elgar | Nimrod (Enigma Variations) | Orchestra: West–Eastern Divan Orchestra. Conductor: Daniel Barenboim. |
| 19 Sep 2021 | Francesca Stavrakopoulou | Steve Reich | Tehillim | Orchestra: Los Angeles Philharmonic. Choir: Synergy Vocals. Conductor: Stefan Asbury. |
| 26 Sep 2021 | Walter Iuzzolino | Richard Strauss | "Morgen!", Op. 27, No. 4 | Singer: Elisabeth Schwarzkopf. Orchestra: London Symphony Orchestra. Conductor: George Szell |
| 26 Sep 2021 | Walter Iuzzolino | Frank Chacksfield Orchestra | "J'attendrai" | |
| 26 Sep 2021 | Walter Iuzzolino | Jules Massenet | "C'est tois, mon pere" (Thais) | Singer: Renée Fleming. Singer: Thomas Hampson. Orchestra: Bordeaux-Aquitaine Orchestra. Conductor: Yves Abel. |
| 26 Sep 2021 | Walter Iuzzolino | Jules Massenet | "A cette heure supreme" (Werther) | Singer: Roberto Alagna. Singer: Angela Gheorghiu. Orchestra: London Symphony Orchestra. Conductor: Sir Antonio Pappano. |
| 26 Sep 2021 | Walter Iuzzolino | Alexandre Desplat | Birth Waltz (Birth Soundtrack) | |
| 26 Sep 2021 | Walter Iuzzolino | Frédéric Chopin | Waltz in B minor, Op. 69, No. 2 | Performer: Vladimir Ashkenazy. |
| 26 Sep 2021 | Walter Iuzzolino | Kurt Weill | "Lied des Lotteriagenten" (Der Silbersee) | Singer: Ute Lemper. Orchestra: Rundfunk-Sinfonieorchester Berlin. Conductor: John Mauceri. |
| 26 Sep 2021 | Walter Iuzzolino | Charles Gounod | "Par quel trouble... Nuit resplendissante" (Cinq-mars) | Singer: Vesselina Kasarova. Orchestra: Munich Radio Orchestra. Conductor: Frédéric Chaslin. |
| 10 Oct 2021 | Esther Freud | Umm Kulthum | Al Nil | |
| 10 Oct 2021 | Esther Freud | Michael Hoppe | Some other time – for Carl Sandburg | Performer: Martin Tillman. |
| 10 Oct 2021 | Esther Freud | Stephen Sondheim | "Losing my mind" (Follies) | Performer: Imelda Staunton. |
| 10 Oct 2021 | Esther Freud | Kurt Weill | "Surabaya Jonny" (Happy End) | Performer: Lotte Lenya. |
| 10 Oct 2021 | Esther Freud | Benjamin Britten | Dawn [Four Sea Interludes from Peter Grimes] | Orchestra: BBC Philharmonic Orchestra. Conductor: Edward Gardner. CHANDOS. |
| 10 Oct 2021 | Esther Freud | Camille Saint‐Saëns | "The Swan" (Carnival of the Animals) | Performer: Sol Gabetta. Performer: Irène Timacheff-Gabetta. |
| 17 Oct 2021 | Mark Solms | Johann Sebastian Bach | Prelude and Fugue in C♯ major (Well-Tempered Clavier, Book 2) | Performer: Peter Hill. |
| 17 Oct 2021 | Mark Solms | György Ligeti | Musica ricercata VI & XI | Performer: Pierre‐Laurent Aimard. |
| 17 Oct 2021 | Mark Solms | Frédéric Chopin | Nocturne in F♯ major, Op. 15, No. 2 | Performer: Jan Lisiecki. |
| 17 Oct 2021 | Mark Solms | Ludwig van Beethoven | Piano Sonata in D minor, Op. 31, No. 2 (Tempest) | Performer: Angela Hewitt. |
| 17 Oct 2021 | Mark Solms | Talking Heads | "Heaven" | |
| 24 Oct 2021 | Rory Stewart | George Frideric Handel | "Lascia ch'io pianga" (Rinaldo) | Singer: Elizabeth Watts. Ensemble: Sacconi Quartet. |
| 24 Oct 2021 | Rory Stewart | Franz Schubert | "Die Forelle" | Performer: Gerald Moore. Singer: Dietrich Fischer‐Dieskau. |
| 24 Oct 2021 | Rory Stewart | Ludwig van Beethoven | Triple Concerto in C major, Op. 56 (2nd movement: Largo) | Performer: Daniel Barenboim. Performer: Anne‐Sophie Mutter. Performer: Yo‐Yo Ma. Orchestra: West–Eastern Divan Orchestra. |
| 24 Oct 2021 | Rory Stewart | Johann Sebastian Bach | "Wann kommst du" (Cantata No. 140: Wachet auf) | Singer: Allan Bergius. Singer: Thomas Hampson. Orchestra: Concentus Musicus Wien. Conductor: Nikolaus Harnoncourt. |
| 24 Oct 2021 | Rory Stewart | Wolfgang Amadeus Mozart | "Se vuol ballare" (Le Nozze di Figaro) | Performer: Gottfried von der Goltz. Singer: Christian Gerhaher. Orchestra: Freiburg Baroque Orchestra. |
| 24 Oct 2021 | Rory Stewart | Jeannie Robertson | The Battle of Harlaw | |
| 24 Oct 2021 | Rory Stewart | George Frideric Handel | "Ombra mai fu" (Xerxes) | Singer: Ian Bostridge. Orchestra: Orchestra of the Age of Enlightenment. Conductor: Harry Bicket |
| 31 Oct 2021 | Matthew Walker | Claude Debussy | "Clair de lune" | Performer: Hélène Grimaud. |
| 31 Oct 2021 | Matthew Walker | Frédéric Chopin | Berceuse in D♭ major, Op. 57 | Performer: Arthur Rubinstein. |
| 31 Oct 2021 | Matthew Walker | George Frideric Handel | "Ombra mai fu" (Xerxes') | Singer: Cecilia Bartoli. Ensemble: Il Giardino Armonico. Conductor: Giovanni Antonini. |
| 31 Oct 2021 | Matthew Walker | Jacques Offenbach | Barcarolle (The Tales of Hoffmann) | Singer: Sumi Jo. Singer: Roberto Alagna. Singer: Catherine Dubosc. |
| 31 Oct 2021 | Matthew Walker | Paul Buckmaster | Dreamers Awake (Twelve Monkeys) | Performer: Michael Davis. |
| 31 Oct 2021 | Matthew Walker | Henry Purcell | "Dido's Lament" | Performer: Camille Thomas. Music arranger: Mathieu Herzog. |
| 31 Oct 2021 | Matthew Walker | Elbow | Golden Slumbers | |
| 7 Nov 2021 | Tamsin Edwards | Franz Liszt | Piano Sonata in B minor | Performer: Vladimir Horowitz. |
| 7 Nov 2021 | Tamsin Edwards | Ludwig van Beethoven | Piano Sonata in D major, Op. 10, No. 3 (1st movement: Presto) | Performer: Maurizio Pollini. |
| 7 Nov 2021 | Tamsin Edwards | Gabriel Fauré | Violin Sonata No. 1 in A major (1st movement: Allegro molto) | Performer: Jane Gordon. Performer: Jan Rautio. |
| 7 Nov 2021 | Tamsin Edwards | Johann Sebastian Bach | Violin Concerto in A minor (3rd movement: Allegro Assai) | Performer: Kati Debretzeni. Ensemble: English Baroque Soloists. Conductor: Sir John Eliot Gardiner. |
| 7 Nov 2021 | Tamsin Edwards | The Old Creole Jazz Band | "Tin Roof Blues" | |
| 7 Nov 2021 | Tamsin Edwards | Arvo Pärt | Bogoroditse Djevo | Choir: Pro Arte Singers. Choir: Theatre of Voices. Conductor: Paul Hillier. |
| 7 Nov 2021 | Tamsin Edwards | Philip Glass | Mad Rush | Performer: Philip Glass. |
| 14 Nov 2021 | Jamila Gavin | George Frideric Handel | "Surely He hath borne our griefs" (Messiah) | Choir: Ambrosian Singers. Orchestra: English Chamber Orchestra. Conductor: Charles Mackerras. |
| 14 Nov 2021 | Jamila Gavin | Franz Schubert | Sonata in A major D.664 (1st movement: Allegro) | Performer: Alfred Brendel. |
| 14 Nov 2021 | Jamila Gavin | Johannes Brahms | Piano Concerto No. 2 in B♭ major (1st movement: Allegro non troppo) | Performer: Arthur Rubinstein. Orchestra: RCA Victor Symphony Orchestra. Conductor: Josef Krips. |
| 14 Nov 2021 | Jamila Gavin | Krishnamurti Sridhar | Raga Darbari | |
| 14 Nov 2021 | Jamila Gavin | Michael Tippett | "Go Down, Moses" (A Child of Our Time) | Orchestra: London Symphony Orchestra. Conductor: Richard Hickox. |
| 14 Nov 2021 | Jamila Gavin | Karlheinz Stockhausen | Gruppen | Orchestra: Berliner Philharmoniker. Conductor: Claudio Abbado. |
| 14 Nov 2021 | Jamila Gavin | Frédéric Chopin | Etude in C major, Op. 10, No. 7 | Performer: Maurizio Pollini. |
| 21 Nov 2021 | Nick Lane | Max Bruch | Scottish Fantasy (1st movement) | Performer: Nicola Benedetti. Orchestra: BBC Scottish Symphony Orchestra. Conductor: Rory MacDonald. |
| 21 Nov 2021 | Nick Lane | Leoš Janáček | String Quartet No. 2 (Intimate Letters) (3rd movement: Moderato) | Ensemble: Smetana Quartet. |
| 21 Nov 2021 | Nick Lane | Lead Belly | "Alabama Bound" | |
| 21 Nov 2021 | Nick Lane | Franz Lehár | The Merry Widow (Act 3: Duet) | Singer: Cheryl Studer. Singer: Bo Skovhus. Orchestra: Vienna Philharmonic. Conductor: Sir John Eliot Gardiner. |
| 21 Nov 2021 | Nick Lane | De Dannan | "The Arrival of the Queen of Sheba (in Galway)" | |
| 21 Nov 2021 | Nick Lane | Johann Sebastian Bach | Chaconne (Partita No. 2 in D minor, BWV.1004) | Performer: Nathan Milstein. |
| 21 Nov 2021 | Nick Lane | Peter Maxwell Davies | "Farewell To Stromness" | Performer: Peter Maxwell Davies. |
| 28 Nov 2021 | Iain Sinclair | Igor Stravinsky | In memoriam Dylan Thomas | Ensemble: Ensemble intercontemporain. Conductor: Pierre Boulez. |
| 28 Nov 2021 | Iain Sinclair | Arrigo Boito | "L'altra notte" (Mefistofele) | Singer: Maria Callas. Orchestra: Philharmonia Orchestra. Conductor: Tullio Serafin. |
| 28 Nov 2021 | Iain Sinclair | Benjamin Britten | Aube (3 Songs for Les Illuminations) | Singer: Sandrine Piau. Orchestra: English Northern Sinfonia. Conductor: Thomas Zehetmair. |
| 28 Nov 2021 | Iain Sinclair | The Baka People of the Central African Republic | Song for Women Gathering Mushrooms | |
| 28 Nov 2021 | Iain Sinclair | Claude Debussy | La Cathedrale Engloutie (Preludes) | Performer: Yannick Nézet‐Séguin. |
| 28 Nov 2021 | Iain Sinclair | Gustav Mahler | "Alles verganglich ist..." (Symphony No. 8) | Orchestra: Staatskapelle Berlin. Conductor: Pierre Boulez. |
| 5 Dec 2021 | Hayley Mills | Giacomo Puccini | "O mio babbino caro" (Gianni Schicchi) | Singer: Maria Callas. Orchestra: Philharmonia Orchestra. Conductor: Tullio Serafin. |
| 5 Dec 2021 | Hayley Mills | Pyotr Ilyich Tchaikovsky | Swan Lake (Act 2, No. 10: Scene) | Performer: Leonard Bernstein. Orchestra: New York Philharmonic. |
| 5 Dec 2021 | Hayley Mills | Felix Mendelssohn | "O for the Wings of a Dove" ("Hear My Prayer") | Singer: Adam Berman. Choir: Eton College Chapel Choir. Conductor: Ralph Allwood. |
| 5 Dec 2021 | Hayley Mills | Joaquín Rodrigo | Concierto de Aranjuez (1st movement) | Performer: Narciso Yepes. Orchestra: Orquesta Sinfónica de Radio Televisión Española. Conductor: Odón Alonso. |
| 5 Dec 2021 | Hayley Mills | Edward Elgar | Cello Concerto in E minor, Op. 85 (2nd movement: Allegro molto) | Performer: Jacqueline du Pré. Orchestra: The Philadelphia Orchestra. Conductor: Daniel Barenboim. |
| 5 Dec 2021 | Hayley Mills | Felix Mendelssohn | Violin Concerto in E minor, Op. 64 (2nd movement: Andante) | Performer: Nigel Kennedy. Orchestra: English Chamber Orchestra. Conductor: Jeffrey Tate. |
| 5 Dec 2021 | Hayley Mills | Johann Sebastian Bach | Air on a G string (Suite No. 3 in D major, BWV.1068) | Orchestra: English Chamber Orchestra. Conductor: Raymond Leppard. |
| 12 Dec 2021 | John Cleese | Pietro Mascagni | "Easter Hymn" (Cavalleria Rusticana) | Singer: Jane Eaglen. Orchestra: Philharmonia Orchestra. Conductor: Carlo Rizzi. |
| 12 Dec 2021 | John Cleese | George Gershwin | "Rhapsody in Blue" | Performer: Oscar Levant. Orchestra: The Philadelphia Orchestra. Conductor: Eugene Ormandy. |
| 12 Dec 2021 | John Cleese | Stanley Myers | "Cavatina" (The Deer Hunter) | Performer: John Williams. |
| 12 Dec 2021 | John Cleese | John Du Prez | A Fish Called Wanda – Suite | Performer: John Williams. |
| 12 Dec 2021 | John Cleese | Scott Joplin | "The Entertainer" | Ensemble: Soundtrack. |
| 12 Dec 2021 | John Cleese | Pyotr Ilyich Tchaikovsky | Violin Concerto in D major, Op. 35 (1st movement: Allegro moderato) | Performer: Guy Braunstein. Orchestra: BBC Symphony Orchestra. Conductor: Kirill Karabits. |
| 26 Dec 2021 | Valentina Harris | Gioachino Rossini | "Les Figues Seches" | Performer: Marco Sollini. |
| 26 Dec 2021 | Valentina Harris | Giorgio Gaber | "Bella Ciao" | |
| 26 Dec 2021 | Valentina Harris | Igor Stravinsky | Firebird Suite (Finale) | Orchestra: London Symphony Orchestra. Conductor: Claudio Abbado. |
| 26 Dec 2021 | Valentina Harris | Giacomo Puccini | "E lucevan le stelle" (Tosca) | Singer: Luciano Pavarotti. Orchestra: National Symphony Orchestra. Conductor: Nicola Rescigno. |
| 26 Dec 2021 | Valentina Harris | Judy Granville | "Hideaway" | |
| 26 Dec 2021 | Valentina Harris | Gaelic Storm | "The Hills of Connemara" | |

== 2022 ==
| Date | Guest | Composer | Title | Performer |
|---|---|---|---|---|
| 2 Jan 2022 | Meg Rosoff | Johannes Brahms | Piano Concerto No. 2 in B♭ major (1st movement: Allegro non troppo) | Performer: Arthur Rubinstein. Orchestra: RCA Victor Symphony Orchestra. Conductor: André Cluytens. |
| 2 Jan 2022 | Meg Rosoff | Johann Sebastian Bach | Gloria (Mass in B minor) | Ensemble: Arcangelo. Conductor: Jonathan Cohen. |
| 2 Jan 2022 | Meg Rosoff | The Clash | "London Calling" | |
| 2 Jan 2022 | Meg Rosoff | Maurice Ravel | String Quartet in F major (1st movement: Allegro moderato) | Ensemble: Alban Berg Quartett. |
| 2 Jan 2022 | Meg Rosoff | Alban Berg | Piano Sonata, Op. 1 | Performer: Alasdair Beatson. |
| 2 Jan 2022 | Meg Rosoff | Johann Sebastian Bach | Prelude and Allemande (Cello Suite No. 1 in G major) | Performer: Steven Isserlis. |
| 2 Jan 2022 | Meg Rosoff | Carl Maria von Weber | Clarinet Quintet in B♭ major (1st movement: Allegro) | Performer: Eric Hoeprich. Ensemble: London Haydn Quartet. |
| 9 Jan 2022 | David Nutt | Edvard Grieg | "In the Hall of the Mountain King" (Peer Gynt) | Orchestra: San Francisco Symphony. Conductor: Herbert Blomstedt. |
| 9 Jan 2022 | David Nutt | Sigmund Romberg | "Drink, drink, drink" (The Student Prince) | Performer: Mario Lanza. |
| 9 Jan 2022 | David Nutt | Ludwig van Beethoven | Symphony No. 7 in A major, Op. 92 (4th movement: Allegro con brio) | Orchestra: London Symphony Orchestra. Conductor: Bernard Haitink. |
| 9 Jan 2022 | David Nutt | Carl Nielsen | Symphony No. 3, Op. 27 (Sinfonia espansiva) (4th movement: Allegro) | Orchestra: Royal Stockholm Philharmonic Orchestra. Conductor: Sakari Oramo. |
| 9 Jan 2022 | David Nutt | Henryk Mikołaj Górecki | Symphony of Sorrowful Songs, Op. 36 (3rd movement) | Orchestra: London Sinfonietta. Conductor: David Zinman. Singer: Dawn Upshaw. |
| 9 Jan 2022 | David Nutt | Gabriel Fauré | "In Paradisum" (Requiem) | Orchestra: Academy of St Martin in the Fields. Conductor: Harry Christophers |
| 16 Jan 2022 | Dame Stephanie Shirley | Carl Davis | Train Rumours (Last Train to Tomorrow) | Orchestra: Czech National Symphony Orchestra. Conductor: Carl Davis. Ensemble: Prague Children's Opera. |
| 16 Jan 2022 | Dame Stephanie Shirley | Benjamin Britten | Balulalow (Ceremony of Carols) | Performer: John Scott. Choir: St Paul's Cathedral Choir. |
| 16 Jan 2022 | Dame Stephanie Shirley | Johann Sebastian Bach | Brandenburg Concerto No. 5 in D major, BWV.1050 (1st movement) | Orchestra: Academy for Ancient Music Berlin. |
| 16 Jan 2022 | Dame Stephanie Shirley | Henry Purcell | "When I am laid in earth" (Dido and Aeneas) | Singer: Jessye Norman. Orchestra: English Chamber Orchestra. Conductor: Raymond Leppard. |
| 16 Jan 2022 | Dame Stephanie Shirley | Johann Sebastian Bach | Aria and Variations 1–5 (Goldberg Variations, BWV.988) | Performer: Glenn Gould. |
| 16 Jan 2022 | Dame Stephanie Shirley | Felix Mendelssohn | Piano Concerto No. 1 in G minor, Op. 25 (1st movement: Molto allegro con fuoco) | Performer: Derek Han. Orchestra: התזמורת הקאמרית הישראלית. Conductor: Stephen Gunzenhauser. |
| 16 Jan 2022 | Dame Stephanie Shirley | Nikolai Rimsky-Korsakov | "Flight of the Bumble Bee" | Performer: Derek Paravicini. |
| 16 Jan 2022 | Dame Stephanie Shirley | Gioachino Rossini | "Duetto buffo di due gatti" | Singer: Elisabeth Schwarzkopf. Singer: Victoria de los Ángeles. |
| 23 Jan 2022 | Katherine Parkinson | Giuseppe Giordani | "Caro mio ben" | Performer: György Fischer. Singer: Cecilia Bartoli. |
| 23 Jan 2022 | Katherine Parkinson | John Tavener | "The Protecting Veil" | Performer: Natalie Clein. Orchestra: English Chamber Orchestra. Conductor: Stephen Layton. |
| 23 Jan 2022 | Katherine Parkinson | Ennio Morricone | Cinema Paradiso | |
| 23 Jan 2022 | Katherine Parkinson | Thomas Tallis | Salvator Mundi | Choir: Oxford Camerata. Conductor: Jeremy Summerly. |
| 23 Jan 2022 | Katherine Parkinson | George Gershwin | "I Loves You, Porgy" | Singer: Nina Simone. |
| 23 Jan 2022 | Katherine Parkinson | Joseph Horovitz | "The rain it raineth every day" (Twelfth Night) | Performer: Trevor Peacock. Performer: Christopher Wilson. |
| 23 Jan 2022 | Katherine Parkinson | Tsinandali Choir | Chakrulo | |
| 20 Feb 2022 | Kate Bingham | Alessandro Marcello | Oboe Concerto in D minor (2nd movement: Adagio) | Performer: Albrecht Mayer. Ensemble: New Seasons Ensemble. |
| 20 Feb 2022 | Kate Bingham | Frank Loesser | Guys and Dolls | Performer: Cast. |
| 20 Feb 2022 | Kate Bingham | Giacomo Puccini | Tosca(Act 1 Finale) | Singer: Bryn Terfel. Orchestra: Swedish Radio Symphony Orchestra. Conductor: Paul Daniel. |
| 20 Feb 2022 | Kate Bingham | Eliza Randall | "Echolocation" | Lyricist: Sam Norman. Performer: Mason McDowell. |
| 20 Feb 2022 | Kate Bingham | Gustav Holst | "Jupiter" (The Planets) | Orchestra: The National Youth Orchestra. Conductor: Edward Gardner. |
| 20 Feb 2022 | Kate Bingham | Robert Schumann | Piano Quartet in E♭ major, Op. 47 (3rd movement: Andante cantabile) | Performer: Thomas Riebl. Ensemble: The Florestan Trio. |
| 20 Feb 2022 | Kate Bingham | Arturo Márquez | Danzon No. 2 | Orchestra: Simón Bolívar Symphony Orchestra. Conductor: Gustavo Dudamel. |
| 6 Feb 2022 | Barbara Taylor Bradford | Giacomo Puccini | "Un bel di, vedremo" (Madama Butterfly) | Singer: Ana María Martínez. Orchestra: Prague Philharmonia. Conductor: Steven Mercurio. |
| 6 Feb 2022 | Barbara Taylor Bradford | Giacomo Puccini | "O soave fanciulla" (La Bohème) | Singer: Anna Netrebko. Singer: Piotr Beczala. Orchestra: New York Metropolitan Opera Orchestra. Conductor: Marco Armiliato. |
| 6 Feb 2022 | Barbara Taylor Bradford | Georges Bizet | "Toreador, be ready" (Carmen) | Singer: Gerald Finley. Orchestra: London Philharmonic Orchestra. Conductor: Edward Gardner. |
| 6 Feb 2022 | Barbara Taylor Bradford | Pyotr Ilyich Tchaikovsky | Swan Lake – Finale | Orchestra: London Symphony Orchestra. Conductor: André Previn. |
| 6 Feb 2022 | Barbara Taylor Bradford | Ludwig van Beethoven | Piano Sonata in C♯ minor, Op. 27, No. 2 (Moonlight) (1st movement: Adagio sostenuto) | Performer: "Stephen Kovacevich." |
| 6 Feb 2022 | Barbara Taylor Bradford | Sergey Rachmaninov | Piano Concerto No. 2 in C minor, Op. 18 (2nd movement: Adagio sostenuto) | Performer: Leif Ove Andsnes. Orchestra: Berliner Philharmoniker. Conductor: Sir Antonio Pappano. |
| 6 Feb 2022 | Barbara Taylor Bradford | Giacomo Puccini | "Vissi d'arte" (Tosca) | Singer: Maria Callas. Orchestra: Paris Conservatoire Orchestra. Conductor: Georges Prêtre. |
| 13 Feb 2022 | Sanjeev Gupta | George Frideric Handel | "Io t'abbraccio" (RodelindaAct 2) | Singer: Iestyn Davies. Singer: Lucy Crowe. Orchestra: The English Concert. Conductor: Harry Bicket. |
| 13 Feb 2022 | Sanjeev Gupta | Olivier Messiaen | "Zion Park et la Cite Celeste" (Des Canyons aux Etoiles) | Orchestra: French Radio Philharmonic Orchestra. Conductor: Myung-Whun Chung. |
| 13 Feb 2022 | Sanjeev Gupta | Peteris Vasks | Violin Concerto (Distant Light) | Performer: Anthony Marwood. Orchestra: Academy of St Martin in the Fields |
| 13 Feb 2022 | Sanjeev Gupta | Gustav Mahler | Symphony No. 4 (3rd movement: Ruhevoll) | Orchestra: City of Birmingham Symphony Orchestra. Conductor: Sir Simon Rattle. |
| 13 Feb 2022 | Sanjeev Gupta | John Luther Adams | Become Ocean | Orchestra: Seattle Symphony. Conductor: Ludovic Morlot. |
| 13 Feb 2022 | Sanjeev Gupta | Johann Sebastian Bach | Partita No. 1 in B♭ major (4th movement: Sarabande) | Performer: Igor Levit. |
| 13 Feb 2022 | Sanjeev Gupta | Anna Meredith | Paramour | |
| 27 Feb 2022 | Theaster Gates | Black Monks of Mississippi | "Do not pass me by" | |
| 27 Feb 2022 | Theaster Gates | Scott Joplin | The Cascades | Performer: Joshua Rifkin. |
| 27 Feb 2022 | Theaster Gates | Chevalier de Saint-Georges Joseph Bologne | Violin Concerto No. 9 in G major (2nd movement: Largo) | Performer: Takako Nishizaki. Orchestra: Kölner Kammerorchester. Conductor: Helmut Müller‐Brühl. |
| 27 Feb 2022 | Theaster Gates | William Grant Still | "Land of superstition" (Africa) | Orchestra: Fort Smith Symphony Orchestra. Conductor: John Jeter. |
| 27 Feb 2022 | Theaster Gates | Claude Debussy | "The Snow is Dancing" (Children's Corner) | Performer: Alain Planès. |
| 27 Feb 2022 | Theaster Gates | Sergey Rachmaninov | "The Isle of the Dead" | Orchestra: Russian National Orchestra. Conductor: Mikhail Pletnev. |
| 27 Feb 2022 | Theaster Gates | Florence Price | "Nimble Feet" (Dances in the Canebrakes) | Orchestra: Chicago Sinfonietta. Conductor: Mei-Ann Chen. |
| 6 Mar 2022 | Esther Rantzen | Edward Elgar | Chanson de Matin Op. 15`2 | Orchestra: Royal Liverpool Philharmonic Orchestra. Conductor: Vasily Petrenko. |
| 6 Mar 2022 | Esther Rantzen | Georges Bizet | "Dat's Love" (Carmen Jones) | Music arranger: Oscar Hammerstein II. Singer: Marilyn Horne. |
| 6 Mar 2022 | Esther Rantzen | Georges Brassens | "Chanson pour l'auvergnat" | |
| 6 Mar 2022 | Esther Rantzen | Edvard Grieg | "Morning Mood" (Peer Gynt) | Orchestra: City of Birmingham Symphony Orchestra. Conductor: Sakari Oramo. |
| 6 Mar 2022 | Esther Rantzen | Wolfgang Amadeus Mozart | "Voi Che Sapete" (The Marriage of Figaro) | Singer: Teresa Berganza. Orchestra: English Chamber Orchestra. Conductor: Daniel Barenboim. |
| 6 Mar 2022 | Esther Rantzen | Johannes Brahms | Concerto in A minor for Violin, Cello and Orchestra, Op. 102 (2nd movement: Andante) | Performer: Mstislav Rostropovich. Performer: David Oistrakh. Orchestra: The Cleveland Orchestra. Conductor: George Szell. |
| 6 Mar 2022 | Esther Rantzen | Johann Pachelbel | How, Where, When? | Performer: James Galway. Performer: John Dankworth. Singer: Cleo Laine. |
| 13 Mar 2022 | Katy Brand | Carlo Gesualdo | Gioite voi col canto | Choir: Collegium Vocale Gent. Conductor: Philippe Herreweghe. |
| 13 Mar 2022 | Katy Brand | Giacomo Puccini | In questa reggia (Turandot) | Singer: Montserrat Caballé. Singer: José Carreras. Orchestra: Orchestre philharmonique de Strasbourg. Conductor: Alain Lombard. |
| 13 Mar 2022 | Katy Brand | Albert Jakeway | "The Astronaut March" | Performer: Black Dyke Band. Conductor: Geoffrey Brand. |
| 13 Mar 2022 | Katy Brand | The Beatles | "Norwegian Wood" | |
| 13 Mar 2022 | Katy Brand | Leopold Mozart | Concerto for Alphorn and orchestra | Performer: Dennis Brain. Music arranger: Gerard Hoffnung. Orchestra: Hoffnung Symphony Orchestra. Conductor: Norman Del Mar. |
| 13 Mar 2022 | Katy Brand | Wolfgang Amadeus Mozart | "Der Holle Rache" (Die Zauberflote) | Singer: Diana Damrau. Orchestra: Le Cercle de l'Harmonie. Conductor: Jérémie Rhorer. |
| 13 Mar 2022 | Katy Brand | André Parfenov | "Aachener Walzer" (after Tchaikovsky) | Orchestra: Aachen Symphony Orchestra. Conductor: Christopher Ward. |
| 20 Mar 2022 | Misan Harriman | Alex North | "Unchained Melody" | Performer: Soundtrack. |
| 20 Mar 2022 | Misan Harriman | John Williams | "Suo Gan" (Empire of the Sun) | Performer: James Rainbird. Choir: The Ambrosian Junior Choir. Conductor: John McCarthy. Empire of the Sun soundtrack. WARNER BROS RECORDS. 1. |
| 20 Mar 2022 | Misan Harriman | John Barry | "The Loss of the Journal" (Dances With Wolves) | Performer: Soundtrack. |
| 20 Mar 2022 | Misan Harriman | Dario Marianelli | "Elegy for Dunkirk" (Atonement) | Performer: Caroline Dale. Orchestra: English Chamber Orchestra. |
| 20 Mar 2022 | Misan Harriman | William Walton | Suite: Henry V | Orchestra: Philharmonia Orchestra. Conductor: William Walton. |
| 20 Mar 2022 | Misan Harriman | Mark Isham | "Sense of Touch" (Crash) | Performer: Carol Ensley. |
| 20 Mar 2022 | Misan Harriman | Howard Shore | "The Bridge of Khazad-Dum" (The Fellowship of the Ring) | Performer: Soundtrack. |
| 27 Mar 2022 | Richard Holloway | Plainsong | "When Israel Came..." (Tonus Peregrinus) | Choir: Belfast Cathedral Choir. |
| 27 Mar 2022 | Richard Holloway | Michael Nyman | "The Promise" (The Piano – soundtrack) | |
| 27 Mar 2022 | Richard Holloway | Edward Elgar | Cello Concerto in E minor (1st movement: Adagio – Moderato) | Performer: Jacqueline du Pré. Orchestra: London Symphony Orchestra. Conductor: John Barbirolli. |
| 27 Mar 2022 | Richard Holloway | Sergey Rachmaninov | Rhapsody on a Theme of Paganini | Performer: Tamás Vásáry. Orchestra: London Symphony Orchestra. Conductor: Yuri Ahronovitch. |
| 27 Mar 2022 | Richard Holloway | Johannes Brahms | "Ihr habt nun Traurigkeit" (Ein Deutsches Requiem) | Singer: Margaret Price. Orchestra: Royal Philharmonic Orchestra. Choir: Ambrosian Singers. Conductor: André Previn. |
| 27 Mar 2022 | Richard Holloway | Plainsong | "O blest creator of light" | Performer: Michael Hoeg. Choir: Llandaff Cathedral Choir. Conductor: Richard Moorhouse. |
| 3 Apr 2022 | Francesco da Mosto | Antonio Vivaldi | "Winter" (The Four Seasons) (1st movement: Allegro non molto) | Performer: Adrian Chandler. Ensemble: La Serenissima. |
| 3 Apr 2022 | Francesco da Mosto | Giuseppe Verdi | "Di Quella Pira" (Il Trovatore, Act 3) | Singer: Gino Penno. Conductor: Antonio Narducci. |
| 3 Apr 2022 | Francesco da Mosto | Giuseppe Verdi | "Ave Maria" (Otello, Act 3) | Singer: Rosalind Plowright. Singer: Lise Davidsen. Orchestra: London Philharmonic Orchestra. Conductor: Sir Mark Elder. |
| 3 Apr 2022 | Francesco da Mosto | Henry Purcell | What pow'r art thou (King Arthur) | Singer: Tim Mead. Ensemble: Les Musiciens de Saint-Julien. Conductor: François Lazarevitch. |
| 3 Apr 2022 | Francesco da Mosto | Ennio Morricone | Once upon a time in the West (Finale) | Performer: Edda Dell'Orso. |
| 3 Apr 2022 | Francesco da Mosto | Mina | Parole Parole | |
| 3 Apr 2022 | Francesco da Mosto | Alessandro Marcello | Oboe Concerto in D minor (2nd movement: Adagio) | Performer: Katharina Spreckelsen. Orchestra: The English Concert. Conductor: Harry Bicket. |
| 3 Apr 2022 | Francesco da Mosto | Giacomo Puccini | "O mio babbino caro" (Gianni Schicchi) | Singer: Barbara Hendricks. Orchestra: French Radio Philharmonic Orchestra. Conductor: Paavo Järvi. |
| 17 Apr 2022 | Tim Birkhead | Traditional Catalan | "Song of the Birds" | Performer: Pau Casals. Orchestra: Prades Festival Orchestra. |
| 17 Apr 2022 | Tim Birkhead | Wolfgang Amadeus Mozart | Piano Concerto No. 17 in G major | Performer: Mitsuko Uchida. Orchestra: The Cleveland Orchestra. |
| 17 Apr 2022 | Tim Birkhead | Isaac Albéniz | Granada (Suite Espanola No. 1) | Performer: Andrés Segovia. |
| 17 Apr 2022 | Tim Birkhead | Ludwig van Beethoven | Piano Sonata in D minor, Op. 31, No. 2 (Tempest) (1st movement: Largo – Allegro) | Performer: Daniel Barenboim. |
| 17 Apr 2022 | Tim Birkhead | Josquin des Prez | Scaramella | Performer: Shirley Rumsey. |
| 17 Apr 2022 | Tim Birkhead | Traditional Irish | "Danny Boy" ("Londonderry Air") | Performer: Beatrice Harrison. |
| 17 Apr 2022 | Tim Birkhead | Trad. | His Eyes were Suns | Performer: Jan Garbarek. Performer: Ingor Ántte Áilu Gaup. |
| 24 Apr 2022 | Clare Marx | Benjamin Britten | Dawn (Four Sea Interludes) | Orchestra: BBC Symphony Orchestra. Conductor: Andrew Davis. |
| 24 Apr 2022 | Clare Marx | Pyotr Ilyich Tchaikovsky | Piano Concerto No. 1 in B♭ major (1st movement) | Performer: Kirill Gerstein. Orchestra: Czech Philharmonic. Conductor: Semyon Bychkov. |
| 24 Apr 2022 | Clare Marx | Giuseppe Verdi | "Libera Me" (Requiem) | Singer: Angela Gheorghiu. Orchestra: Berliner Philharmoniker. Conductor: Claudio Abbado. |
| 24 Apr 2022 | Clare Marx | Giuseppe Verdi | "Bella figlia dell'amore" (Rigoletto) | Singer: June Anderson. Singer: Shirley Verrett. Singer: Luciano Pavarotti. Singer: Leo Nucci. |
| 24 Apr 2022 | Clare Marx | Ludwig van Beethoven | Symphony No. 9 in D minor (4th movement: Presto) | Singer: June Anderson. Singer: Sarah Walker. Singer: Klaus Konig. Singer: Jan‐Hendrik Rootering. Conductor: Leonard Bernstein. |
| 24 Apr 2022 | Clare Marx | Johannes Brahms | Concerto in A minor for violin, cello and orchestra (3rd movement: Vivace non troppo) | Performer: Anne‐Sophie Mutter. Performer: Antônio Meneses. Orchestra: Berliner Philharmoniker. Conductor: Herbert von Karajan. |
| 24 Apr 2022 | Clare Marx | Wolfgang Amadeus Mozart | "Soave sia il vento" (Cosi fan tutte) | Singer: Montserrat Caballé. Singer: Janet Baker. Singer: Richard van Allan. Orchestra: Orchestra of the Royal Opera House, Covent Garden. Conductor: Colin Davis. |
| 1 May 2022 | Osman Yousefzada | Amir Khusro | "Chaap Tilak" (You've taken everything from me) | Performer: Abida Parveen. Performer: Rahat Fateh Ali Khan. |
| 1 May 2022 | Osman Yousefzada | Philip Glass | Etude No.2 | Performer: Jeremy Denk. |
| 1 May 2022 | Osman Yousefzada | Arooj Aftab | Saans Lo (Vulture Prince) | |
| 1 May 2022 | Osman Yousefzada | Amadou & Mariam | "Je pense a toi" | |
| 1 May 2022 | Osman Yousefzada | Zoë Keating | Exurgency | |
| 1 May 2022 | Osman Yousefzada | Omar Hisham | "Surah Al-Mulk" (Quran) | |
| 1 May 2022 | Osman Yousefzada | Meerabai | "Sanson ki Mala" (On the rosary of breath) | Performer: Nusrat Fateh Ali Khan. |
| 15 May 2022 | Waheed Arian | Lata Mangeshkar | "Wada na tod" (The Heart Given to You) | |
| 15 May 2022 | Waheed Arian | Henry Bishop | "Home, Sweet Home" | Performer: Katherine Jenkins. Conductor: Nicholas Dodd. |
| 15 May 2022 | Waheed Arian | Pankaj Udhas | A Letter has Come (Naam) | |
| 15 May 2022 | Waheed Arian | Charlie Chaplin | Overture: City Lights | Orchestra: City Lights Orchestra. Conductor: Carl Davis. |
| 15 May 2022 | Waheed Arian | Ahmad Wali | "Aftab" | |
| 15 May 2022 | Waheed Arian | Trad. | Amazing Grace | Performer: Andrea Bocelli. |
| 22 May 2022 | Kat Arney | Arnold Bax | Harp Quintet | Ensemble: Mobius Ensemble. |
| 22 May 2022 | Kat Arney | Mulatu Astatke | Chinese New Year | |
| 22 May 2022 | Kat Arney | Ludwig Göransson | Theme from The Mandalorian | |
| 22 May 2022 | Kat Arney | Johannes Brahms | Rhapsody in G minor, Op. 79, No. 2 | Performer: Martha Argerich. |
| 22 May 2022 | Kat Arney | Nina Simone | "Little Girl Blue" | |
| 22 May 2022 | Kat Arney | Camille Saint‐Saëns | "The Swan" (Carnival of the Animals) | Performer: Sebastian Comberti. Performer: Miriam Keogh. |
| 22 May 2022 | Kat Arney | Graham Fitkin & Ruth Wall | Close Hold | |
| 29 May 2022 | Jarvis Cocker | Frederick Delius | Hassan (Closing Scene) | Orchestra: London Philharmonic Orchestra. Choir: Royal Opera House Chorus. Conductor: Thomas Beecham. |
| 29 May 2022 | Jarvis Cocker | Bernard Herrmann | The Lost City/Atlantis (Journey to the Center of the Earth) | |
| 29 May 2022 | Jarvis Cocker | Scott Walker | The Childhood of a Leader (Opening) | |
| 29 May 2022 | Jarvis Cocker | Franz Schubert | Piano Trio in E♭ major, D.929 (2nd movement: Andante con moto) | Performer: Ralph Holmes. Performer: Moray Welsh. Performer: Anthony Goldstone. |
| 29 May 2022 | Jarvis Cocker | Sergey Rachmaninov | Piano Concerto No. 3 in D minor (1st movement: Allegro) | Performer: Peter Donohoe. Orchestra: Moscow Radio Symphony Orchestra. Conductor: Vladimir Fedoseyev. |
| 29 May 2022 | Jarvis Cocker | Max Richter | Song/Echo (Sleep) | |
| 29 May 2022 | Jarvis Cocker | Erik Satie | Gymnopedie No. 3 | Ensemble: Camarata Contemporary Music Group. |
| 5 Jun 2022 | Anne Glenconner | Edward Elgar | "Nimrod" (Enigma Variations) | Orchestra: London Philharmonic Orchestra. Conductor: Adrian Boult. |
| 5 Jun 2022 | Anne Glenconner | Edward Elgar | "Softly and Gently" (The Dream of Gerontius) | Singer: Dame Sarah Connolly. Choir: BBC Symphony Chorus. Orchestra: BBC Symphony Orchestra. Conductor: Andrew Davis. |
| 5 Jun 2022 | Anne Glenconner | Michael William Balfe | "I dreamt I dwelt in marble halls" (The Bohemian Girl) | Singer: Joan Sutherland. Orchestra: London Symphony Orchestra. Conductor: Richard Bonynge. |
| 5 Jun 2022 | Anne Glenconner | Benjamin Britten | "Look Through the Port" (Billy Budd) | Singer: Thomas Hampson. Orchestra: Hallé. Conductor: Kent Nagano. |
| 5 Jun 2022 | Anne Glenconner | Giuseppe Verdi | "Va, pensiero" (Nabucco) | Choir: Ambrosian Singers. Orchestra: Philharmonia Orchestra. Conductor: Riccardo Muti. |
| 5 Jun 2022 | Anne Glenconner | Giuseppe Verdi | "Dies irae" (Requiem) | Choir: London Philharmonic Choir. Orchestra: London Philharmonic Orchestra. Conductor: David Parry. |
| 5 Jun 2022 | Anne Glenconner | Arthur Sullivan | "If You Give Me Your Attention" (Princess Ida) | Singer: John Reed. Orchestra: Royal Philharmonic Orchestra. Conductor: Malcolm Sargent. |
| 5 Jun 2022 | Anne Glenconner | Ronald Binge | "Sailing By" | Orchestra: BBC Concert Orchestra. Conductor: Vernon Handley. |
| 12 Jun 2022 | Francesca Simon | Theodore Bikel | Kum aher du Filosof | |
| 12 Jun 2022 | Francesca Simon | Johann Sebastian Bach | Concerto in D minor for 2 violins and strings (1st movement: Vivace) | Performer: Jascha Heifetz. Orchestra: RCA Victor Chamber Orchestra. Conductor: Franz Waxman. |
| 12 Jun 2022 | Francesca Simon | Alan Stivell | Jenovefa | |
| 12 Jun 2022 | Francesca Simon | Pyotr Ilyich Tchaikovsky | Eugene Onegin (Act 1, Sc.3: Onegin's aria) | Singer: Dmitri Hvorostovsky. Singer: Olga Guryakova. Orchestra: Orchester der Wiener Staatsoper. Conductor: Kirill Petrenko. |
| 12 Jun 2022 | Francesca Simon | Wolfgang Amadeus Mozart | Le Nozze di Figaro ("Sull'aria...") | Singer: Barbara Bonney. Singer: Arleen Augér. Orchestra: Drottningholm Court Theatre Orchestra. Conductor: Arnold Östman. |
| 12 Jun 2022 | Francesca Simon | Ernest John Moeran | String Quartet in A minor (1st movement: Allegro) | Ensemble: Maggini Quartet. |
| 12 Jun 2022 | Francesca Simon | Gavin Higgins | Ekstasis (3: We turn to the gods...) | Performer: David Cohen. Performer: Sara Roberts. Ensemble: Piatti Quartet. |
| 10 Jul 2022 | Katherine Rundell | William Corkine | Break of Day | Performer: Nigel North. Singer: Paul Hillier. |
| 10 Jul 2022 | Katherine Rundell | Johann Strauss II | "The Blue Danube" | Orchestra: Vienna Philharmonic. Conductor: Mariss Jansons. |
| 10 Jul 2022 | Katherine Rundell | Gabriel Fauré | "In Paradisum" (Requiem) | Choir: Balthasar‐Neumann‐Chor. Orchestra: Basel Symphony Orchestra. Conductor: Ivor Bolton. |
| 10 Jul 2022 | Katherine Rundell | Miles Davis | Ascenseur pour l'echafaud | |
| 10 Jul 2022 | Katherine Rundell | Johann Sebastian Bach | "Jesu Joy of Man's Desiring" (Cantata No. 147) | Ensemble: Bach Collegium Japan. Conductor: Masaaki Suzuki. |
| 10 Jul 2022 | Katherine Rundell | Wolfgang Amadeus Mozart | Le Nozze di Figaro (Act IV-Finale) | Orchestra: English Baroque Soloists. Conductor: Sir John Eliot Gardiner. |
| 10 Jul 2022 | Katherine Rundell | John Adams | "Batter my heart" (Doctor Atomic) | Singer: Gerald Finley. Orchestra: London Philharmonic Orchestra. Conductor: Edward Gardner. |
| 18 Sep 2022 | James Runcie | Johann Sebastian Bach | Cantata No. 51: Jauchzet Gott in allen Landen | Singer: Julianne Baird. Ensemble: Bach‐Collegium Stuttgart. Director: Joshua Rifkin. |
| 18 Sep 2022 | James Runcie | Franz Schubert | Impromptu in C minor, D.899 No. 1 | Performer: Alfred Brendel. |
| 18 Sep 2022 | James Runcie | Johann Sebastian Bach | French Suite No. 5 in G major (3rd movement: Sarabande) | Performer: Joanna MacGregor. |
| 18 Sep 2022 | James Runcie | Ella Fitzgerald | "Blue Moon" | |
| 18 Sep 2022 | James Runcie | Johann Sebastian Bach | "Mache dich..." (St Matthew Passion) | Singer: Dietrich Fischer‐Dieskau. Orchestra: Munich Bach Orchestra. Conductor: Karl Richter. |
| 18 Sep 2022 | James Runcie | Henry Purcell | "An evening hymn" | Singer: Carolyn Sampson. Performer: Elizabeth Kenny |
| 25 Sep 2022 | Gwen Adshead | Thomas Tallis | "If Ye Love Me" | Choir: The Sixteen. Conductor: Harry Christophers |
| 25 Sep 2022 | Gwen Adshead | New Zealand Maori Chorale | Pokarekare Ana | |
| 25 Sep 2022 | Gwen Adshead | Giuseppe Verdi | Dies Irae (Requiem) | Singer: Katia Ricciarelli. Orchestra: Orchestra of La Scala, Milan. Choir: Chorus of La Scala, Milan. Conductor: Claudio Abbado. |
| 25 Sep 2022 | Gwen Adshead | Morten Lauridsen | "Sure on this shining night" | Performer: Morten Lauridsen. Choir: Chamber Choir of Europe. Conductor: Nicol Matt. |
| 25 Sep 2022 | Gwen Adshead | The Beatles | "Here Comes the Sun" | |
| 25 Sep 2022 | Gwen Adshead | Orlando Gibbons | "Drop, drop, slow tears" | Choir: Gabrieli Consort. Conductor: Paul McCreesh. |
| 25 Sep 2022 | Gwen Adshead | George Gershwin | "Summertime" (Porgy and Bess) | Singer: Harolyn Blackwell. Orchestra: London Philharmonic Orchestra. Conductor: Sir Simon Rattle. |
| 2 Oct 2022 | Jules Montague | information not found | information not found | information not found |
| 9 Oct 2022 | Ronnie Archer-Morgan | Wolfgang Amadeus Mozart | Concerto in C major for flute and harp (2nd movement: Andantino) | Performer: James Galway. Performer: Marisa Robles. Orchestra: London Symphony Orchestra. Conductor: Michael Tilson Thomas. |
| 9 Oct 2022 | Ronnie Archer-Morgan | Donald Byrd | Places and Spaces | |
| 9 Oct 2022 | Ronnie Archer-Morgan | George Frideric Handel | "Ombra mai fu" (Xerxes) | Singer: Andreas Scholl. Ensemble: Berlin Academy for Early Music. |
| 9 Oct 2022 | Ronnie Archer-Morgan | Sam Cooke | "Goin' Home" | |
| 9 Oct 2022 | Ronnie Archer-Morgan | Antonín Dvořák | Symphony No. 9 in E minor (from The New World) (2nd movement: Largo) | Orchestra: Vienna Philharmonic. Conductor: Herbert von Karajan. |
| 9 Oct 2022 | Ronnie Archer-Morgan | Marvin Gaye | "Abraham, Martin & John" | |
| 9 Oct 2022 | Ronnie Archer-Morgan | Antonín Dvořák | "Song to the Moon" (Rusalka) | Singer: Karita Mattila. Orchestra: Finnish Radio Symphony Orchestra. Conductor: Jukka‐Pekka Saraste. |
| 9 Oct 2022 | Ronnie Archer-Morgan | Esther Phillips | "I'm in the Mood for Love" | |
| 16 Oct 2022 | Arifa Akbar | information not found | information not found | information not found |
| 23 Oct 2022 | William Kentridge | Trio Da Kali and Kronos Quartet | "God Shall Wipe All Tears Away" | |
| 23 Oct 2022 | William Kentridge | Claudio Monteverdi | "Chiome d'oro" | Singer: Hugues Cuénod. Singer: Paul Derenne. |
| 23 Oct 2022 | William Kentridge | Elizabeth Cotten | "I'm Going Away" | |
| 23 Oct 2022 | William Kentridge | Hector Berlioz | "Le Spectre de la Rose" (Nuits d'Ete) | Singer: Janet Baker. Orchestra: New Philharmonia Orchestra. Conductor: John Barbirolli. |
| 23 Oct 2022 | William Kentridge | Richard Wagner | Tannhäuser – concert paraphrase | Performer: Mikhail Rudy. Music arranger: Franz Liszt. |
| 23 Oct 2022 | William Kentridge | Dmitri Shostakovich | Symphony No. 10 (2nd movement: Allegro) | Orchestra: Boston Symphony Orchestra. Conductor: Andris Nelsons. |
| 23 Oct 2022 | William Kentridge | Wolfgang Amadeus Mozart | Bei Mannern... (Die Zauberflote) | Singer: Evelyn Lear. Singer: Dietrich Fischer‐Dieskau. Orchestra: Berliner Philharmoniker. Conductor: Karl Bohm. |
| 6 Nov 2022 | Stuart MacBride | Richard Wagner | Götterdämmerung (Act 2, excerpt) | Singer: Lars Cleveman. Singer: Attila Jun. Orchestra: Hallé. Conductor: Mark Elder. |
| 6 Nov 2022 | Stuart MacBride | Gustav Holst | "Mars, The Bringer of War" (The Planets) | Orchestra: Philharmonia Orchestra. Conductor: Sir John Eliot Gardiner. |
| 6 Nov 2022 | Stuart MacBride | Henry Purcell | "When I am laid in Earth" (Dido and Aeneas) | Singer: Janet Baker. Orchestra: English Chamber Orchestra. Conductor: Anthony Lewis. |
| 6 Nov 2022 | Stuart MacBride | Sean O'Boyle | Concerto for Didgeridoo (4th movement: Fire) | Orchestra: Queensland Symphony Orchestra. Conductor: Sean O'Boyle. |
| 6 Nov 2022 | Stuart MacBride | Max Bruch | Violin Concerto No. 1 in G minor (2nd movement: Adagio) | Performer: Sonoko Miriam Shimano Welde. Orchestra: Oslo Philharmonic Orchestra. Conductor: Tabita Berglund. |
| 6 Nov 2022 | Stuart MacBride | Ludwig van Beethoven | Piano Sonata in C♯ minor (Moonlight) (1st movement: Adagio) | Performer: Martin Roscoe. |
| 6 Nov 2022 | Stuart MacBride | Carl Orff | "Omnia sol temperat" (Carmina Burana) | Singer: Christopher Maltman. Orchestra: London Symphony Orchestra. Conductor: Richard Hickox. |
| 13 Nov 2022 | Julia Blackburn | Benjamin Britten | "Dirge" (Serenade for Tenor, Horn and Strings) | Performer: Dennis Brain. Singer: Peter Pears. Orchestra: New Symphony Orchestra. Conductor: Eugene Goossens. |
| 13 Nov 2022 | Julia Blackburn | Billie Holiday | "Pennies from Heaven" | |
| 13 Nov 2022 | Julia Blackburn | Trad. | The Agincourt Carol | Ensemble: Musica Reservata. Conductor: John Beckett. |
| 13 Nov 2022 | Julia Blackburn | Aka Pygmies/Steve Reich | Bossobe/Clapping Music | |
| 13 Nov 2022 | Julia Blackburn | Ludwig van Beethoven | Fantasia in D major (1st movement: Allegro) | Performer: Massimo Anfossi. |
| 13 Nov 2022 | Julia Blackburn | Giovanni Battista Pergolesi | "Stabat Mater" | Singer: Emma Kirkby. Singer: James Bowman. Ensemble: Academy of Ancient Music. Conductor: Christopher Hogwood. |
| 13 Nov 2022 | Julia Blackburn | Hannes Buder | "No death and no regrets" (Outside Words) | |
| 20 Nov 2022 | Simon Warrack | Antonio Vivaldi | Laudamus te (Gloria, RV.589) | Singer: Sophie Karthäuser. Singer: Lucile Richardot. Orchestra: Les Arts Florissants. Conductor: Paul Agnew. |
| 20 Nov 2022 | Simon Warrack | Benjamin Britten | Fugue (The Young Person's Guide to the Orchestra) | Orchestra: London Symphony Orchestra. Conductor: Benjamin Britten. |
| 20 Nov 2022 | Simon Warrack | Michael Tippett | "Go Down Moses" (A Child of our Time) | Singer: John Shirley‐Quirk. Orchestra: BBC Symphony Orchestra. Conductor: Colin Davis. |
| 20 Nov 2022 | Simon Warrack | Wolfgang Amadeus Mozart | Andante in C major, K.315 | Performer: Philippe Bernold. Orchestra: Paris Chamber Orchestra. |
| 20 Nov 2022 | Simon Warrack | Edward Elgar | Cello Concerto in E minor (1st movement) | Performer: Lynn Harrell. Orchestra: The Cleveland Orchestra. Conductor: Lorin Maazel. |
| 20 Nov 2022 | Simon Warrack | Giuseppe Verdi | Bella figlia dell'amore (Rigoletto) | Orchestra: Orchestra of La Scala, Milan. Conductor: Rafael Kubelík. |
| 20 Nov 2022 | Simon Warrack | Ros Serey Sothea | "Chnam oun Dop-Pram Muy" | |
| 20 Nov 2022 | Simon Warrack | Martyn Beckett | "On the Sunny Side of the Street" | |
| 27 Nov 2022 | Adam Rutherford | Gabriel Fauré | "In Paradisum" (Requiem) | Choir: Tenebrae. Ensemble: London Symphony Orchestra Chamber Ensemble. Conductor: Nigel Short. |
| 27 Nov 2022 | Adam Rutherford | Ludwig van Beethoven | Violin Concerto in D (1st movement) | Performer: Kyung-wha Chung. Orchestra: Amsterdam Royal Concertgebouw Orchestra. Conductor: Klaus Tennstedt. |
| 27 Nov 2022 | Adam Rutherford | Radiohead | "How To Disappear Completely" | |
| 27 Nov 2022 | Adam Rutherford | Johann Sebastian Bach | Prelude in C major (Well-tempered Clavier, Book 1) | Performer: Andrea Vigh. |
| 27 Nov 2022 | Adam Rutherford | Ben Salisbury | The Alien (Annihilation) | |
| 27 Nov 2022 | Adam Rutherford | Mario Batkovic | Quatere | |
| 27 Nov 2022 | Adam Rutherford | Hector Berlioz | "Songe d'une nuit de Sabbat" (Symphonie Fantastique) | Orchestra: Berliner Philharmoniker. Conductor: Sir Simon Rattle. |
| 4 Dec 2022 | Roma Agrawal | Traditional Indian | Alarippu – Kalyani –Mishra Chappu | Performer: O. S. Arun. Performer: M S Sukhi. |
| 4 Dec 2022 | Roma Agrawal | Pyotr Ilyich Tchaikovsky | "Dance of the Sugar Plum Fairy" (Nutcracker) | Orchestra: Los Angeles Philharmonic. Conductor: Gustavo Dudamel. |
| 4 Dec 2022 | Roma Agrawal | Carl Davis | Pride and Prejudice (Main Theme) | Performer: Melvyn Tan. Orchestra: Philharmonia Orchestra. Conductor: Carl Davis. |
| 4 Dec 2022 | Roma Agrawal | Nitin Sawhney | "Sunset" | |
| 4 Dec 2022 | Roma Agrawal | Abida Parveen | Tu Jhoom | |
| 4 Dec 2022 | Roma Agrawal | Anoushka Shankar | Land of Gold | |
| 4 Dec 2022 | Roma Agrawal | Richard Gibbs | Number Six Theme (Battlestar Galactica) | |
| 11 Dec 2022 | Jonathan Romain | Max Bruch | "Kol Nidrei" | Performer: Natalie Clein. Orchestra: BBC Scottish Symphony Orchestra. Conductor: Ilan Volkov. |
| 11 Dec 2022 | Jonathan Romain | Leonard Cohen | "Who by Fire" | |
| 11 Dec 2022 | Jonathan Romain | Nikolai Rimsky-Korsakov | "The Sea and Sinbad's Ship" (Scheherazade) | Orchestra: Oslo Philharmonic Orchestra. Conductor: Vasily Petrenko. |
| 11 Dec 2022 | Jonathan Romain | Burning Bush | Varshaver Freylekhs | |
| 11 Dec 2022 | Jonathan Romain | Vangelis | Chariots of Fire (Main Titles) | |
| 11 Dec 2022 | Jonathan Romain | London Jewish Male Choir | Bendigamos | |
| 11 Dec 2022 | Jonathan Romain | Barry Stoller | Match of the Day Theme | |

== 2023 ==
| Date | Guest | Composer | Title | Performer |
|---|---|---|---|---|
| 8 Jan 2023 | Todd Field | Gustav Mahler | Symphony No. 5 (4th movement: Adagietto) | Orchestra: Berliner Philharmoniker. Conductor: Claudio Abbado. |
| 8 Jan 2023 | Todd Field | Sergey Prokofiev | Peter and the Wolf (Introduction) | Orchestra: The Philadelphia Orchestra. Conductor: Eugene Ormandy. Narrator: David Bowie. |
| 8 Jan 2023 | Todd Field | Sarah Vaughan | "Polka Dots and Moonbeams" | |
| 8 Jan 2023 | Todd Field | Henryk Mikołaj Górecki | String Quartet No. 2 (Quasi una fantasia) (2nd movement: Deciso, energico...) | Ensemble: Kronos Quartet. |
| 8 Jan 2023 | Todd Field | Edward Elgar | Cello Concerto in E minor (1st movement) | Performer: Jacqueline du Pré. Orchestra: London Symphony Orchestra. Conductor: John Barbirolli. |
| 8 Jan 2023 | Todd Field | Stephen Sondheim | "Send in the Clowns" (A Little Night Music) | Singer: Sarah Vaughan. Orchestra: The Count Basie Orchestra. |
| 15 Jan 2023 | Diana Melly | Giacomo Puccini | Un bel di... (Madame Butterfly) | Singer: Renata Scotto. Orchestra: The Rome Opera Orchestra. Conductor: John Barbirolli. |
| 15 Jan 2023 | Diana Melly | Franz Schubert | Der Fischer | Performer: Gerald Moore. Singer: Dietrich Fischer‐Dieskau. |
| 15 Jan 2023 | Diana Melly | Jules Massenet | "Baigne d'eau..." (Thais) | Singer: Renée Fleming. Singer: Thomas Hampson. Orchestra: Bordeaux-Aquitaine Orchestra. Conductor: Yves Abel. |
| 15 Jan 2023 | Diana Melly | Wolfgang Amadeus Mozart | "Dalla sua pace" (Don Giovanni) | Singer: Francisco Araiza. Orchestra: Academy of St Martin in the Fields. Conductor: Neville Marriner |
| 15 Jan 2023 | Diana Melly | Gustav Mahler | Oft denk' ich... (Kindertotenlieder) | Orchestra: Vienna Philharmonic. Conductor: Bruno Walter. Singer: Kathleen Ferrier. |
| 15 Jan 2023 | Diana Melly | Christoph Willibald Gluck | "Che faro..." (Orfeo ed Euridice) | Singer: Marilyn Horne. Orchestra: Orchestra of the Royal Opera House, Covent Garden. Conductor: Georg Solti. |
| 15 Jan 2023 | Diana Melly | Giuseppe Verdi | "Ella giammai m'amò" (Don Carlo) | Singer: Boris Christoff. Orchestra: Philharmonia Orchestra. Conductor: Jerzy Semkow. |
| 22 Jan 2023 | Hugh Brody | Jean Sibelius | Symphony No. 7 in C | Orchestra: Berliner Philharmoniker. Conductor: Herbert von Karajan. |
| 22 Jan 2023 | Hugh Brody | Connie Francis | "Stupid Cupid" | |
| 22 Jan 2023 | Hugh Brody | Igor Stravinsky | "Full Fathom Five" (3 Songs from William Shakespeare) | Singer: Cathy Berberian. Ensemble: Columbia Chamber Ensemble. Conductor: Igor Stravinsky. |
| 22 Jan 2023 | Hugh Brody | Johnny Cash | Sunday Morning Coming Down | |
| 22 Jan 2023 | Hugh Brody | Ludwig van Beethoven | Sonata in A major, Op. 69 (1st movement: Allegro) | Performer: Yo‐Yo Ma. Performer: Emanuel Ax. |
| 22 Jan 2023 | Hugh Brody | Clara Schumann | Nocturne, Op. 6, No. 2 | Performer: Lucy Parham. |
| 22 Jan 2023 | Hugh Brody | George Walker | "When lilacs last in the dooryard bloom'd" (Lilacs) | Singer: Latonia Moore. Orchestra: The Cleveland Orchestra. Conductor: Franz Welser‐Möst. |
| 29 Jan 2023 | Joanna Scanlan | Wolfgang Amadeus Mozart | Der Holle Rache (Die Zauberflote) | Performer: Cosmé McMoon. Singer: Florence Foster Jenkins. |
| 29 Jan 2023 | Joanna Scanlan | Henry Walford Davies | "I will lift up mine eyes" (Psalm 121) | Choir: The Choir of Canterbury Cathedral. Conductor: David Flood. |
| 29 Jan 2023 | Joanna Scanlan | Gavin Bryars | "Jesus' blood never failed me yet" | Ensemble: Hampton String Quartet. Ensemble: Gavin Bryars Ensemble. |
| 29 Jan 2023 | Joanna Scanlan | Johannes Brahms | Intermezzo in E♭ major, Op. 117, No. 1 | Performer: Radu Lupu. |
| 29 Jan 2023 | Joanna Scanlan | Hildegard von Bingen | "O viridissima virga" | Choir: Sequentia. Conductor: Barbara Thornton. |
| 29 Jan 2023 | Joanna Scanlan | Richard Wagner | O sink hernieder (Tristan und Isolde) | Singer: Margaret Price. Singer: René Kollo. Orchestra: Staatskapelle Dresden. Conductor: Carlos Kleiber. |
| 29 Jan 2023 | Joanna Scanlan | Alexandre Desplat | Griet's Theme (Girl with a Pearl Earring) | |
| 29 Jan 2023 | Joanna Scanlan | Alessandro Scarlatti | "Le Violette" | Performer: John Constable. Singer: Stuart Burrows. |
| 5 Feb 2023 | Kaffe Fassett | Erik Satie | Gymnopedie No. 1 | Performer: Peter Dickinson. |
| 5 Feb 2023 | Kaffe Fassett | Leonard Bernstein | "Somewhere" (West Side Story) | Performer: Members of the Cast. |
| 5 Feb 2023 | Kaffe Fassett | The Beatles | "I Want To Hold Your Hand" | |
| 5 Feb 2023 | Kaffe Fassett | Arvo Pärt | "Spiegel im Spiegel" | Performer: Daniel Hope. Performer: Simon Mulligan. |
| 5 Feb 2023 | Kaffe Fassett | Carl Orff | "Fortuna" (Carmina Burana) | Orchestra: Bournemouth Symphony Orchestra. Conductor: Marin Alsop. |
| 5 Feb 2023 | Kaffe Fassett | Robert Schumann | Kinderszenen (excerpt) | Performer: Sir András Schiff. |
| 5 Feb 2023 | Kaffe Fassett | Alfredo Catalani | "Ebben? Ne andro lontana" (La Wally) | Singer: Wilhelmenia Fernandez. Orchestra: London Symphony Orchestra. Conductor: Vladimir Cosma. |
| 12 Feb 2023 | Simon Thurley | Giacomo Puccini | "E lucevan le stelle" (Tosca) | Singer: Rolando Villazón. Orchestra: Munich Radio Orchestra. Conductor: Marcello Viotti. |
| 12 Feb 2023 | Simon Thurley | Gustav Holst | "The Hymn of Jesus" (Prelude) | Choir: Hallé Youth Choir. Orchestra: Hallé. Conductor: Mark Elder. |
| 12 Feb 2023 | Simon Thurley | Henry Purcell | "Fairest Isle" (King Arthur) | Singer: Carolyn Sampson. Ensemble: Gabrieli Consort. Conductor: Paul McCreesh |
| 12 Feb 2023 | Simon Thurley | George Frideric Handel | "Zadok the Priest" | Choir: Choir of Westminster Abbey. Ensemble: The English Concert. Conductor: Trevor Pinnock. |
| 12 Feb 2023 | Simon Thurley | Pietro Mascagni | "Gli aranci olezzano" (Cavalleria Rusticana) | Choir: Chicago Symphony Chorus. Orchestra: Chicago Symphony Orchestra. Conductor: Riccardo Muti. |
| 12 Feb 2023 | Simon Thurley | Vincenzo Bellini | Act III Finale (I Puritani) | Singer: Joan Sutherland. Singer: Luciano Pavarotti. Orchestra: London Symphony Orchestra. Conductor: Richard Bonynge. |
| 12 Feb 2023 | Simon Thurley | Christoph Willibald Gluck | "Cet asile..." (Orfee et Eurydice) | Singer: Barbara Hendricks. Orchestra: Lyon Opera Orchestra. Conductor: Sir John Eliot Gardiner. |
| 19 Feb 2023 | Susie Boyt | Ludwig van Beethoven | Sonata in B♭ major, Op. 106 (Hammerklavier) (3rd movement: Adagio Sostenuto) | Performer: Murray Perahia. |
| 19 Feb 2023 | Susie Boyt | Adolphe Adam | Giselle (Act 1: Giselle's Entrance) | Orchestra: Tasmanian Symphony Orchestra. Conductor: Nicolette Fraillon. |
| 19 Feb 2023 | Susie Boyt | Gus Elen | "It's a great big shame!" | |
| 19 Feb 2023 | Susie Boyt | Benjamin Britten | The Turn of the Screw (Act 1, Prologue) | Singer: Ian Bostridge. Orchestra: Mahler Chamber Orchestra. Conductor: Daniel Harding. |
| 19 Feb 2023 | Susie Boyt | Kurt Weill | "It Never Was You" | Performer: Dave Lee. Singer: Judy Garland. |
| 19 Feb 2023 | Susie Boyt | Jule Styne | Overture: Gypsy | Conductor: Milton Rosenstock. |
| 19 Feb 2023 | Susie Boyt | Wolfgang Amadeus Mozart | Piano Sonata in C major, K.545 (2nd movement: Andante) | Performer: Mitsuko Uchida. |
| 26 Feb 2023 | Wayne Sleep | Benjamin Britten | A Midsummer Night's Dream (final scene) | Orchestra: City of London Sinfonia. Conductor: Richard Hickox. |
| 26 Feb 2023 | Wayne Sleep | Arthur Schwartz | "Dancing in the Dark" | Performer: N.F.I. |
| 26 Feb 2023 | Wayne Sleep | Joseph Horovitz | Lobster Quadrille (Alice in Wonderland) | Orchestra: Ron Goodwin and His Concert Orchestra. |
| 26 Feb 2023 | Wayne Sleep | John Kander | "Money" (Cabaret) | Performer: Wayne Sleep. |
| 26 Feb 2023 | Wayne Sleep | Gustav Mahler | Symphony No. 4 | Orchestra: Nederlands Philharmonisch Orkest. Conductor: Marc Albrecht. |
| 26 Feb 2023 | Wayne Sleep | Andrew Lloyd Webber | "Old Gumbie Cat" (Cats) | Performer: Wayne Sleep. |
| 26 Feb 2023 | Wayne Sleep | Billy Joel | "Uptown Girl" | |
| 26 Feb 2023 | Wayne Sleep | Andrew Lloyd Webber | Variations (Song and Dance) | Orchestra: Orchestra. |
| 12 Mar 2023 | Peter J Conradi | Benjamin Britten | "Libera me" (War Requiem) | Orchestra: London Symphony Orchestra. Conductor: Benjamin Britten. |
| 12 Mar 2023 | Peter J Conradi | Richard Strauss | "Marie Theres" (Rosenkavalier, Act III) | Orchestra: Orchestra of the Royal Opera House, Covent Garden. Conductor: Colin Davis. |
| 12 Mar 2023 | Peter J Conradi | Béla Bartók | Concerto for orchestra (4th movement: Intermezzo interrotto | Orchestra: Helsinki Philharmonic Orchestra. Conductor: Susanna Mälkki. |
| 12 Mar 2023 | Peter J Conradi | Leonard Cohen | Anthem | |
| 12 Mar 2023 | Peter J Conradi | Sergey Prokofiev | "Juliet's Death" (Romeo and Juliet) | Orchestra: Orchestra of the Royal Opera House, Covent Garden. Conductor: Mark Ermler. |
| 12 Mar 2023 | Peter J Conradi | Johann Sebastian Bach | Prelude (Cello Suite No. 1 in G) | Performer: Yo‐Yo Ma. |
| 12 Mar 2023 | Peter J Conradi | Franz Schubert | String Quintet in C (2nd movement: Adagio) | Performer: Isaac Stern. Performer: Alexander Schneider. Performer: Milton Katims. Performer: Pau Casals. Performer: Paul Tortelier. |
| 19 Mar 2023 | Helena Kennedy | Giacomo Puccini | "Si, mi chiamano Mimi" (La Bohème) | Singer: Mirella Freni. Orchestra: Philharmonia Orchestra. Conductor: Giuseppe Sinopoli. |
| 19 Mar 2023 | Helena Kennedy | Guido Haazen | Sanctus (Missa Luba) | Choir: Les Troubadours du Roi Baudouin. |
| 19 Mar 2023 | Helena Kennedy | George Frideric Handel | "Ombra mai fu" (Xerxes) | Singer: Lorraine Hunt Lieberson. Orchestra: Orchestra of the Age of Enlightenment. Conductor: Harry Bicket |
| 19 Mar 2023 | Helena Kennedy | James McMillan | "Stabat Mater" | Choir: The Sixteen. Orchestra: Britten Sinfonia. Conductor: Harry Christophers |
| 19 Mar 2023 | Helena Kennedy | Johann Sebastian Bach | Prelude (Cello Suite No. 4 in E♭ major) | Performer: Alisa Weilerstein. |
| 19 Mar 2023 | Helena Kennedy | Franz Schubert | Piano Sonata in A major, D.664 (2nd movement: Andante) | Performer: Mitsuko Uchida. |
| 19 Mar 2023 | Helena Kennedy | Sir George Benjamin | Written on Skin (Act 2, excerpt) | Singer: Barbara Hannigan. Orchestra: Mahler Chamber Orchestra. Conductor: Sir George Benjamin. |
| 26 Mar 2023 | Robert Powell | Gustav Mahler | Symphony No. 5 (4th movement: Adagietto) | Orchestra: Amsterdam Royal Concertgebouw Orchestra. Conductor: Bernard Haitink. |
| 26 Mar 2023 | Robert Powell | Leoš Janáček | Sinfonietta (1st movement) | Orchestra: London Symphony Orchestra. Conductor: Sir Simon Rattle. |
| 26 Mar 2023 | Robert Powell | Igor Stravinsky | The Soldier's Tale (final scenes) | Ensemble: Columbia Chamber Ensemble. Conductor: Igor Stravinsky. |
| 26 Mar 2023 | Robert Powell | Bob Dylan | "Don't Think Twice, It's All Right" | |
| 26 Mar 2023 | Robert Powell | Johann Sebastian Bach | Toccata and Fugue in D minor | Ensemble: Jacques Loussier Trio. |
| 26 Mar 2023 | Robert Powell | Ariel Ramírez | Misa Criolla (Kyrie) | Choir: Estudio Coral de Buenos Aires. Conductor: Ricardo Hagman. |
| 26 Mar 2023 | Robert Powell | Kaiser Chiefs | Ruby | |
| 9 Apr 2023 | Steve Rosenberg | Dmitri Shostakovich | Piano Concerto No. 2 in F major Op. 102; 1st movement Allegro | Performer: Dmitri Shostakovich Jnr. Performer: Maxim Dmitrievich Shostakovich. Orchestra: I Musici de Montréal. Shostakovich: Piano Concerto No. 2 in F major, Op. 102, etc.. Chandos. 1. |
| 9 Apr 2023 | Steve Rosenberg | Michael Roberts | Perpetuum Mobile | Orchestra: Michael Roberts Orchestra. Conductor: Roberto Capelli. Conroy |
| 9 Apr 2023 | Steve Rosenberg | Antonín Dvořák | Slavonic Dances, Op. 46, No. 6 in A♭ major | Performer: Katia Labèque. Performer: Marielle Labèque. Decca 00028948308064. Decca. 6. |
| 9 Apr 2023 | Steve Rosenberg | Nikita Bogoslovsky | "Dark Is the night" | Lyricist: Vladimir Agatov. Singer: Mark Bernes. Moroz Records 3614591613241. Moroz Records. 22. |
| 9 Apr 2023 | Steve Rosenberg | Myroslav Skoryk | Melody from High Pass | Orchestra: Odessa Philharmonic Orchestra. Conductor: Hobart Earle. Myroslav Skoryk: Carpathian Concerto. Naxos. 5. |
| 9 Apr 2023 | Steve Rosenberg | Victor Borge | A Mozart Opera | Performer: Victor Borge. Singer: Victor Borge. Victor Borge- Live!. Sony. 3. |
| 9 Apr 2023 | Steve Rosenberg | Marc‐Antoine Charpentier | Te Deum H.146 (Prelude) | Ensemble: Les Arts Florissants. Conductor: William Christie. Harmonia Mundi |
| 9 Apr 2023 | Steve Rosenberg | Sergey Rachmaninov | Piano Concerto No. 2 in C minor, Op. 18; 2nd movement: Adagio Sostenuto | Performer: Boris Giltburg. Orchestra: Royal Scottish National Orchestra. Conductor: Carlos Miguel Prieto. Rachmaninov: Piano Concerto No. 2 & Études-Tableaux, Op. 33. Naxos. 2. |
| 16 Apr 2023 | Libby Jackson | Gustav Holst | "Jupiter" from The Planets | Performer: Hallé. Conductor: Mark Elder. |
| 16 Apr 2023 | Libby Jackson | Giuseppe Verdi | "Dies Irae" from Requiem | Choir: Monteverdi Choir. Orchestra: Orchestre Révolutionnaire et Romantique. Conductor: Sir John Eliot Gardiner. |
| 16 Apr 2023 | Libby Jackson | Irene Sankoff | "Screech In" | Lyricist: David Hein. Performer: Shanneyganock. |
| 16 Apr 2023 | Libby Jackson | George Frideric Handel | The Arrival of the Queen of Sheba | Orchestra: Tafelmusik. Conductor: Jeanne Lamon. |
| 16 Apr 2023 | Libby Jackson | Samuel Barber | "Agnus Dei" (choral) | Performer: Accentus Chamber Choir. Conductor: Laurence Equilbey. |
| 16 Apr 2023 | Libby Jackson | Public Service Broadcasting | Go! | The Race for Space. Test Card Recordings. |
| 16 Apr 2023 | Libby Jackson | Jennifer Walshe | The Site of an Investigation | Orchestra: BBC Scottish Symphony Orchestra. Conductor: Ilan Volkov. |
| 16 Apr 2023 | Libby Jackson | George Michael | "My Baby Just Cares for Me (Live)" | Songs From the Last Century. Virgin. |
| 30 Apr 2023 | Isabel Wilkerson | Georg Philipp Telemann | Rosinante Galloping (Movement 6) from Burlesque de Don Quixotte | Ensemble: Apollo’s Fire. Conductor: Jeannette Sorrell. Avie |
| 30 Apr 2023 | Isabel Wilkerson | Camille Saint‐Saëns | Organ Symphony No. 3 in C minor, Op. 78 | Orchestra: Orchestre national de France. Performer: Olivier Latry. Conductor: Cristian Măcelaru. |
| 30 Apr 2023 | Isabel Wilkerson | Alfredo Catalani | "Ebben? Ne Andrò Lontana" (from the opera La Wally) | Singer: Wilhelmenia Wiggins Fernandez. Orchestra: London Symphony Orchestra. Conductor: Vladimir Cosma. |
| 30 Apr 2023 | Isabel Wilkerson | John Coltrane | "Blue Train" | Performer: John Coltrane. Blue Train. Blue Note. |
| 30 Apr 2023 | Isabel Wilkerson | Carlos Simon | "Rays of Light" (from Warmth from Other Suns) | Performer: Ivalas Quartet. Light Migration Music Part 1 (Lara Downes and Friends). Rising Sun. |
| 30 Apr 2023 | Isabel Wilkerson | Traditional (from Piae Cantiones) | Gaudete! – Performed in concert in 2016 | Performer: Angel City Chorale of Los Angeles. Music arranger: Michael Engelhardt. Conductor: Sue Fink. |
| 30 Apr 2023 | Isabel Wilkerson | Philip Glass | Final Movement of String Quartet No. 5 | Performer: Kronos Quartet. Kronos Quartet perform Philip Glass. Nonesuch. |
| 30 Apr 2023 | Isabel Wilkerson | Claude Debussy | Reverie | Performer: Alice Sara Ott. Nightfall. Deutsche Grammophon. |
| 30 Apr 2023 | Isabel Wilkerson | Georg Philipp Telemann | "Burlesque de Quixotte": VI. Le galope de Rosinante | Ensemble: Apollo’s Fire. Conductor: Jeannette Sorrell. AVIE. |
| 30 Apr 2023 | Isabel Wilkerson | Camille Saint‐Saëns | Symphony No. 3 in C minor, Op. 78 "Organ Symphony", 2nd movement: Maestoso. Allegro | Conductor: Cristian Măcelaru. Orchestra: Orchestre national de France. Saint-Saëns: Complete Symphonies. Warner Classics. 20. |
| 30 Apr 2023 | Isabel Wilkerson | Alfredo Catalani | Ebben? Ne Andrò Lontana (from La Wally) | Singer: Wilhelmenia Fernandez. Orchestra: London Symphony Orchestra. Conductor: Vladimir Cosma. Larghetto. |
| 30 Apr 2023 | Isabel Wilkerson | John Coltrane | "Blue Train" | Blue Train. Blue Note Records. 1. |
| 30 Apr 2023 | Isabel Wilkerson | Carlos Simon | "Warmth from Other Suns" | Ensemble: Ivalas Quartet. LIGHT: Migration Music Part 1. Rising Sun Records. |
| 30 Apr 2023 | Isabel Wilkerson | Trad. | Gaudete! | Director: Angel City Chorale. Director: Sue Fink. |
| 30 Apr 2023 | Isabel Wilkerson | Philip Glass | String Quartet No. 5: Movement V. | Ensemble: Kronos Quartet. Kronos Quartet Performs Philip Glass. Nonesuch. 5. |
| 30 Apr 2023 | Isabel Wilkerson | Claude Debussy | Rêverie, L. 68 | Performer: Alice Sara Ott. Nightfall. Deutsche Grammophon (DG). 1. |
| 7 May 2023 | Ben Watt | William Grant Still | Summerland (3 Visions) | Performer: Bruce Levingston. Citizen. Sono Luminus. 201. |
| 7 May 2023 | Ben Watt | Wes Montgomery Trio | "Mi Cosa" | Guitar On The Go. Riverside. 8. |
| 7 May 2023 | Ben Watt | Quincy Jones | "Brown Ballad" | (feat. Toots Thielemans) Smackwater Jack. A&M JAZZ. 6. |
| 7 May 2023 | Ben Watt | Johannes Brahms | Sapphische Ode, Op. 94, No. 4 | Performer: Phyllis Spurr. Singer: Kathleen Ferrier. DECCA. |
| 7 May 2023 | Ben Watt | Gonzalo Rubalcaba | "Silencio" (Silence) | Solo. Blue Note Records. 3. |
| 7 May 2023 | Ben Watt | Laurie Spiegel | The Unquestioned Answer | Performer: Laurie Spiegel. Unseen World. |
| 7 May 2023 | Ben Watt | Dean McPhee | "Sky Burial" | Blast First Petite. |
| 7 May 2023 | Ben Watt | Peteris Vasks | Songs of Love – IV. Then Time Stopped | Ensemble: Signum Saxophone Quartet. Echoes. Deutsche Grammophon (DG). 9. |
| 7 May 2023 | Ben Watt | Josiah Steinbrick & Sam Gendel | Mouthfeel 5 | Full Bloom. |
| 14 May 2023 | Mary-Ann Ochota | Ludwig van Beethoven | 3rd Movement of Moonlight Sonata Presto agitato | Performer: Sir Stephen Hough. Hyperion CDA67686. |
| 14 May 2023 | Mary-Ann Ochota | Ryan Probert | The Great Wave off Kanagawa and South Wind, Clear Sky (Red Fuji) from Thirty Six Views of Mount Fuji | Performer: Vickers Bovey Guitar Duo. Clement Records. |
| 14 May 2023 | Mary-Ann Ochota | Trad/Ian Cameron (arr. James MacMillan) | "O, chì, chì mi na mòrbheanna" The Mist-covered Mountains | Performer: The King's Singers. Signum Classics SIGCD607. |
| 14 May 2023 | Mary-Ann Ochota | Khaled | Didi | Performer: Khaled. Barclay Records 865401-2. |
| 14 May 2023 | Mary-Ann Ochota | Trad. | An excerpt from Bellerman Exercise #101 | Performer: Callum Armstrong. Callum Armstrong Aulos Collective YouTube channel video. |
| 14 May 2023 | Mary-Ann Ochota | Clément Janequin | Le chant des Oyseaux | Performer: Ensemble Clément Janequin. Harmonia Mundi France HMC 901099. |
| 14 May 2023 | Mary-Ann Ochota | Georg Frideric Handel | Courante from keyboard suite No. 4 HWV HWV 429 | Performer: Keith Jarrett. ECM 1530. |
| 14 May 2023 | Mary-Ann Ochota | Billy Joel | "Lullabye" (Goodnight, My Angel) | Performer: Billy Joel. Columbia COL 473872 2. |
| 21 May 2023 | Norman Ackroyd | Franz Schubert | Impromptus Op. 90, No. 3 in G♭ major | Performer: Murray Perahia. Schubert Impromptus D899 & 935. Sony Classical. 3. |
| 21 May 2023 | Norman Ackroyd | Arwel Hughes | Cwm Rhondda | Choir: Pendyrus Male Voice Choir. |
| 21 May 2023 | Norman Ackroyd | Bob Dylan | "Love Minus Zero" | |
| 21 May 2023 | Norman Ackroyd | Ludwig van Beethoven | Piano Sonata in D minor, Op. 31, 'Tempest' (2nd movement) | Performer: Alfred Brendel. Philips. |
| 21 May 2023 | Norman Ackroyd | Gregorio Allegri | Miserere | Choir: The Sixteen. Conductor: Harry Christophers. Coro. |
| 21 May 2023 | Norman Ackroyd | De Dannan | "The Coolin" | De Dannan. De Dannan. 6. |
| 21 May 2023 | Norman Ackroyd | Poppy Ackroyd | "Mechanism" | Performer: Poppy Ackroyd. Escapement. One Little Indian Records. 7. |
| 21 May 2023 | Norman Ackroyd | Franz Schubert | Quintet in C major D.956 for 2 violins, viola and 2 cellos: Adagio | Performer: Heinrich Schiff. Ensemble: Alban Berg Quartett. EMI Masters : 6230792. EMI Masters. 2. |
| 28 May 2023 | Sarah Lee | Johann Sebastian Bach | "Jesu, nun sei gepreiset" BWV 41: Chorus | Orchestra: Amsterdam Baroque Orchestra. Conductor: Ton Koopman. J.S. Bach: Cantatas Vol. 11. Challenge Classics. 21. |
| 28 May 2023 | Sarah Lee | George Frideric Handel | Concerto Grosso in B♭ Op. 3, No. 2 (2nd movement) | Orchestra: Les Musiciens du Louvre. Conductor: Marc Minkowski. Warner Classics |
| 28 May 2023 | Sarah Lee | Nina Simone | "For All We Know" | Singer: Nina Simone. Nina Simone. CHARLY. 13. |
| 28 May 2023 | Sarah Lee | Domenico Scarlatti | Sonata in E major Kk.380 | Performer: Yuja Wang. |
| 28 May 2023 | Sarah Lee | Gary Brooker | "A Whiter Shade of Pale | Composer: Keith Reid. Performer: King Curtis. Music arranger: King Curtis. Live at the Fillmore West. Rhino/Elektra. 2. |
| 28 May 2023 | Sarah Lee | Johann Sebastian Bach | Prelude & Fugue No. 10 in E minor, BWV 855 | Performer: Glenn Gould. Glenn Gould plays Bach: The Well-Tempered Clavier Books I & II, BWV 846-893. Sony Classical. 20. |
| 4 Jun 2023 | Kit de Waal | Sergey Rachmaninov | Piano Concerto No. 2 in C minor (1st movement) | Performer: Evgeny Kissin. Conductor: Valery Gergiev. Orchestra: London Symphony Orchestra. Rachmaninoff: Concerto No. 2 & 6 Études-Tableaux. RCA Red Seal. 1. |
| 4 Jun 2023 | Kit de Waal | Georges Bizet | "Dat's love" (Carmen Jones) | Music arranger: Oscar Hammerstein II. Singer: Marilyn Horne. Conductor: Herschel Burke-Gilbert. Carmen Jones (Original Motion Picture Soundtrack). Top Tracks. 9. |
| 4 Jun 2023 | Kit de Waal | Johann Sebastian Bach | Partita in A minor, BWV 1013: I. Allemande | Performer: Marion Ralincourt. NoMadMusic. |
| 4 Jun 2023 | Kit de Waal | Trad. | "Casadh an tSúgáin" (Twisting the Rope) | Singer: Iarla Ó Lionáird. Brooklyn (Original Motion Picture Soundtrack). Sony Classical. 12. |
| 4 Jun 2023 | Kit de Waal | Bill Evans | "Blue in Green" | Performer: Miles Davis. Performer: Miles Davis. Performer: John Coltrane. Performer: Bill Evans. Performer: Paul Chambers. Performer: Jimmy Cobb. Complete Columbia Recordings. Columbia. 5. |
| 4 Jun 2023 | Kit de Waal | Antonio Vivaldi | "Ah ch'infelice sempre" (Cessate, omai cessate) | Singer: Andreas Scholl. Ensemble: Ensemble 415. Director: Chiara Banchini. HARMONIA MUNDI. |
| 4 Jun 2023 | Kit de Waal | Frédéric Chopin | Prelude in E minor Op. 28, No. 4 | Performer: Maria João Pires. Deutsche Grammophon (DG) |
| 11 Jun 2023 | Beccy Speight | Ludwig van Beethoven | Symphony No. 5 in C minor (4th movement) | Orchestra: Britten Sinfonia. Conductor: Thomas Adès. Beethoven: Symphonies Nos. 4–6 – Barry: Viola Concerto, The Conquest of Ireland. Signum Classics. 204. |
| 11 Jun 2023 | Beccy Speight | Georges Bizet | "Au fond du temple saint" (The Pearl Fishers) | Singer: John Aler. Singer: Gino Quilico. Orchestra: Orchestre national du Capitole de Toulouse. Conductor: Michel Plasson. Bizet: Les Pecheurs du Perles. Warner Classics. 106. |
| 11 Jun 2023 | Beccy Speight | Aaron Copland | "Fanfare for the Common Man" | Orchestra: Los Angeles Philharmonic. Conductor: Zubin Mehta. Aaron Copland: The World of Aaron Copland. Decca. 1. |
| 11 Jun 2023 | Beccy Speight | Träd | 04_BS_Lark in the Clear Air | Music arranger: Karine Polwart. Singer: Karine Polwart. A Pocket of Wind Resistance. Hudson Records. 3. |
| 11 Jun 2023 | Beccy Speight | Edward Elgar | Cello concerto in E minor | Performer: Sheku Kanneh‐Mason. Orchestra: City of Birmingham Symphony Orchestra. Conductor: Mirga Gražinytė‐Tyla. |
| 11 Jun 2023 | Beccy Speight | Ralph Vaughan Williams | "The Waves" (A Sea Symphony) | Choir: Hallé Choir. Orchestra: Hallé. Conductor: Sir Mark Elder. Halle. |
| 11 Jun 2023 | Beccy Speight | Peter Maxwell Davies | "Farewell to Stromness" (The Yellow Cake Revue) | Performer: Peter Maxwell Davies. Peter Maxwell Davies: A Celebration of Scotland: Scottish Chamber Orch & Choir. Unicorn-Kanchana. |
| 18 Jun 2023 | Naomi Alderman | Johann Sebastian Bach | Brandenburg Concerto No. 4 in G major BWV 1049 (1st movement) | Orchestra: Concerto Italiano. Director: Rinaldo Alessandrini. J.S. Bach: Brandenburg Concertos: Concerto Italiano/Alessandrini. Naive. 1. |
| 18 Jun 2023 | Naomi Alderman | Nigel Westlake | Avinu Malkeinu (Compassion) | Lyricist: Lior. Singer: Lior. Orchestra: Sydney Symphony Orchestra. Conductor: Nigel Westlake. Compassion. Australian Broadcasting Corp (ABC). 7. |
| 18 Jun 2023 | Naomi Alderman | Wolfgang Amadeus Mozart | The Marriage of Figaro (Act 2 Finale) | Lyricist: Lorenzo Da Ponte. Orchestra: Chamber Orchestra of Europe. Conductor: Yannick Nézet‐Séguin. Mozart: Le nozze di Figaro, K.492. Deutsche Grammophon (DG). 43. |
| 18 Jun 2023 | Naomi Alderman | Terry Riley | In C | Ensemble: Ensemble Batida. Ensemble Batida. VDE-GALLO |
| 18 Jun 2023 | Naomi Alderman | Ottorino Respighi | Bergamasca (Ancient Airs and Dances) | Orchestra: Munich Radio Orchestra. Conductor: Henry Raudales. Respighi: Antiche danze ed arie per liuto & Gli uccelli. CPO. 204. |
| 18 Jun 2023 | Naomi Alderman | Ferdinand Hérold | Clog Dance (La fille mal gardee) | Music arranger: John Lanchbery. Orchestra: Orchestra of the Royal Opera House, Covent Garden. Conductor: John Lanchbery. Herold/Lecocq: La Fille mal gardee: Royal Opera House Orchestra/Lanchbery. Decca. 17. |
| 18 Jun 2023 | Naomi Alderman | Stephen Sondheim | "Being Alive" (Company) | Lyricist: George Furth. Music arranger: Wally Harper. Singer: Dean Jones. Conductor: Harold Hastings. Orchestra: Original Broadway Cast Orchestra. Company (Original Broadway Cast Recording). Masterworks Broadway. 14. |
| 25 Jun 2023 | Raynor Winn | Peter Knight & John Spiers | Abbots Bromley Horn Dance | |
| 25 Jun 2023 | Raynor Winn | Christoph Willibald Gluck | Melodie (Orfeo ed Euridice) | Music arranger: Giovanni Sgambati. Performer: Hélène Grimaud. |
| 25 Jun 2023 | Raynor Winn | Franz Schubert | Litanei auf das Fest Allerseelen, D. 343 | Performer: Llŷr Williams. Lyricist: Johann Georg Jacobi. Singer: Bryn Terfel. |
| 25 Jun 2023 | Raynor Winn | Benjamin Britten | Four Sea Interludes from Peter Grimes (Dawn) | Orchestra: BBC Philharmonic Orchestra. Conductor: Edward Gardner. |
| 25 Jun 2023 | Raynor Winn | Hannah Martin & Gigspanner Big Band | Salt Song by Hannah Martin | |
| 25 Jun 2023 | Raynor Winn | Ralph Vaughan Williams | The Lark Ascending | Performer: Hyeyoon Park. Performer: Benjamin Grosvenor. |
| 25 Jun 2023 | Raynor Winn | Julie Fowlis | "The Song of the Seal" (Òran an Ròin) | Recording of a live performance on BBC R4 Saturday Live programme TX: 06/11/22021. 1. |
| 2 Jul 2023 | Alexander Polzin | Johann Sebastian Bach | Aria variata in A minor, BWV 989: Aria | Performer: Tamara Stefanovich. PENTATONE. |
| 2 Jul 2023 | Alexander Polzin | Robert Schumann | Andantino, G minor Piano Sonata, Op. 22, No. 2 | Performer: Mitsuko Uchida. Decca |
| 2 Jul 2023 | Alexander Polzin | Richard Wagner | Tristan und Isolde: Act 3 – Prelude; Shepherd's Pipe; "Kurwenal! He!" | Lyricist: Richard Wagner. Singer: Anton Dermota. Singer: René Kollo. Singer: Dietrich Fischer‐Dieskau. Orchestra: Staatskapelle Dresden. Conductor: Carlos Kleiber. Wagner: Tristan und Isolde. Deutsche Grammophon (DG). 21. |
| 2 Jul 2023 | Alexander Polzin | György Kurtág | Hölderlin-Gesänge for Baritone, Op. 35a, Gestalt und Geist | Performer: Heinrich Huber. Performer: David LeClair. Lyricist: Friedrich Hölderlin. Singer: Kurt Widmer. Signs, Games and Messages. ECM Records. 3. |
| 2 Jul 2023 | Alexander Polzin | Johann Sebastian Bach | Sonatina (Cantata No. 106 "Actus Tragicus") | Music arranger: György Kurtág. Performer: Márta Kurtág. Performer: György Kurtág. Kurtág: Játékok. EMC New Series Records. 13. |
| 2 Jul 2023 | Alexander Polzin | Konstantia Gourzi | Anájikon – The Angel in the Blue Garden, Op. 61 | Ensemble: Minguet Quartett. Anájikon. ECM New Series Records. 8. |
| 2 Jul 2023 | Alexander Polzin | Miles Davis | "The Pan Piper" | Performer: Miles Davis. Music arranger: Gil Evans. Ensemble: Studio Orchestra. Sketches of Spain. Columbia. 003. |
| 2 Jul 2023 | Alexander Polzin | Matthew Locke | Locke: Canon '4 in 2' on a plain song | Ensemble: Phantasm. Locke: For Lovers of Consort Music. Linn Records. 23. |
| 9 Jul 2023 | Isabella Tree | George Frideric Handel | "He was despised" (Messiah) | Singer: Alice Coote. Orchestra: Academy of Ancient Music. Conductor: Stephen Cleobury. Handel: Messiah. Warner Classics. 22. |
| 9 Jul 2023 | Isabella Tree | Wolfgang Amadeus Mozart | Clarinet Quintet in A, K. 581, 4th movement (conclusion) | Performer: Nicholas Carpenter. Ensemble: Brindisi Quartet. Mozart: Chamber Quartets. Warner Classics. 18. |
| 9 Jul 2023 | Isabella Tree | Sam Lee | "Turtle Dove" | Old Wow. Cooking Vinyl. 7. |
| 9 Jul 2023 | Isabella Tree | Duo Ji, Lobsanf Tsering, Lhamo Dhondrub, Sonam Topgyal & Pema Drolka | Chanting Nuns | Authentic Tibet 2. Sonoton. 18. |
| 9 Jul 2023 | Isabella Tree | Members of the Bernardi Music Group | White Storks String Octet (final part) | Bernardi Music Group performing at Shipley Arts Festival during lockdown 2020 vi. 1. |
| 9 Jul 2023 | Isabella Tree | Richard Durrant | "Big Fat Earthworm" | Rewilding. The Burning Deck. 6. |
| 9 Jul 2023 | Isabella Tree | Franz Schubert | Piano Quintet in A, "Trout" (4th movement) | Ensemble: Melos Ensemble. Icon: Melos Ensemble. Warner Classics. 108. |
| 9 Jul 2023 | Isabella Tree | Johann Sebastian Bach | "Ich habe genug" (Cantata No. 82) | Singer: Lorraine Hunt Lieberson. Orchestra: Orchestra of Emmanuel Music. Conductor: Craig Smith. NONESUCH. |
| 10 Sep 2023 | Jeremy Deller | Ludwig van Beethoven | Symphony No. 7 in A major (2nd movement) | Orchestra: Berliner Philharmoniker. Conductor: Kirill Petrenko. Beethoven · Tchaikovsky · Schmidt · Stephan. Berlin Philharmonic Orchestra. |
| 10 Sep 2023 | Jeremy Deller | The Fairey Band | Can U Dance? | Acid Brass. Mute. 1. |
| 10 Sep 2023 | Jeremy Deller | Claudio Monteverdi | Beatus vir a 6 | Choir: The Sixteen. Conductor: Harry Christophers. CORO. |
| 10 Sep 2023 | Jeremy Deller | Jeremy Deller | Bat Sounds | Biophilia Live. One Little Indian. 10. |
| 10 Sep 2023 | Jeremy Deller | Traditional Vanuatu | Water Drumming | |
| 10 Sep 2023 | Jeremy Deller | Jaki Liebezeit | Drum Solo | |
| 10 Sep 2023 | Jeremy Deller | Ralph Vaughan Williams | Symphony No. 5 (3rd movement) | Orchestra: London Philharmonic Orchestra. Conductor: Bernard Haitink. Vaughan Williams: Symphony No. 5, Norfolk Rhapsody No. 1 & The Lark Ascending. Warner Classics. |
| 10 Sep 2023 | Jeremy Deller | Sabreen | "Get Back" | Live in Jerusalem 2010. 4. |
| 10 Sep 2023 | Jeremy Deller | Orbury Common | "Constant Billy" | (feat. Boss Morris) Devil Gurning. PRAH Recordings. 2. |
| 17 Sep 2023 | Rhiannon Giddens | Stephen Sondheim | "A Weekend in the Country" (A Little Night Music) | Lyricist: Stephen Sondheim. Ensemble: Original Broadway Cast of A Little Night Music. Conductor: Harold Hastings. A Little Night Music (Original Broadway Cast Recording). Masterworks Broadway. 9. |
| 17 Sep 2023 | Rhiannon Giddens | Johann Sebastian Bach | Suite in E (Prelude) | Performer: Sharon Isbin. Bach: Complete Lute Suites. Warner Classics. 1. |
| 17 Sep 2023 | Rhiannon Giddens | AR Rahman | Radha Kaise Na Jale | Lyricist: Javed Akhtar. Lagaan (Original Motion Picture Soundtrack). Sony Music Entertainment India Pvt. Ltd.. 3. |
| 17 Sep 2023 | Rhiannon Giddens | Duke Ellington | "Black, Brown and Beige: Part IV" | Singer: Mahalia Jackson. Orchestra: Duke Ellington and His Orchestra. Black, Brown, & Beige. Columbia/Legacy. 4. |
| 17 Sep 2023 | Rhiannon Giddens | Camille Saint‐Saëns | Cello Concerto No.1 | Performer: Yo‐Yo Ma. Orchestra: Orchestre national de France. Conductor: Lorin Maazel. Yo-Yo Ma Plays Cello Masterworks. Sony Classical. 1. |
| 17 Sep 2023 | Rhiannon Giddens | Léo Delibes | "Bell Song" (Lakmé) | Singer: Joan Sutherland. Orchestra: Orchestra of the Royal Opera House, Covent Garden. Conductor: Francesco Molinari‐Pradelli. Decca |
| 17 Sep 2023 | Rhiannon Giddens | Francesco Turrisi, Andrea Piccioni, Fabio Tricomi & Lucilla Galeazzi | La Tarantella Dell, Avena | Taquin. |
| 24 Sep 2023 | Peter Frankopan | Edward Naylor | Vox dicentis | Choir: Choir of King’s College, Cambridge. Conductor: Stephen Cleobury. English Anthems. Warner Classics. 5. |
| 24 Sep 2023 | Peter Frankopan | Wolfgang Amadeus Mozart | Serenade in B♭ K. 361 "Gran Partita" (3rd movement) | Ensemble: Wind Ensemble of the Academy of St. Martin in the Fields. Conductor: Neville Marriner. Mozart: Sinfonia concertante / Serenade Nr.10 "Gran Partita". Decca. 7. |
| 24 Sep 2023 | Peter Frankopan | Nurlanbel Nyshanov & Ensemble Tengir-Too | Jangylyk "Novelty" | Music of Central Asia Vol 1: Tengir-Too – Mountain Music of Kyrgyzstan. Smithsonian Folkways Recordings |
| 24 Sep 2023 | Peter Frankopan | Béla Bartók | Concerto for Orchestra (4th movement) | Orchestra: City of Birmingham Symphony Orchestra. Conductor: Sir Simon Rattle. Simon Rattle: Bartok. Warner Classics. 12. |
| 24 Sep 2023 | Peter Frankopan | Pyotr Ilyich Tchaikovsky | Fantasy Overture, Romeo and Juliet | Orchestra: Vienna Philharmonic. Conductor: Lorin Maazel. Tchaikovsky: Symphonies 1–3: Wiener Philharmoniker/Maazel. Decca. 6. |
| 24 Sep 2023 | Peter Frankopan | Antonio Vivaldi | "Cum dederit dilectis" (Nisi Dominus, RV 608) | Singer: Andreas Scholl. Ensemble: Australian Brandenburg Orchestra. Conductor: Paul Dyer. Nisi Dominus/Motets/String Consertos/Salve Regina. Decca. 4. |
| 24 Sep 2023 | Peter Frankopan | Maurice Duruflé | Ubi Caritas | Choir: The Choir Of Trinity College, Cambridge. Conductor: Richard Marlow. Glorious Trinity. Conifer Classics. 5. |
| 1 Oct 2023 | Olivia Harrison | Wolfgang Amadeus Mozart | Piano Concerto No.23 in A major (1st movement) | Performer: Vladimir Ashkenazy. Orchestra: Philharmonia Orchestra. Mozart: The Piano Concertos. Decca Music Group Ltd. 64. |
| 1 Oct 2023 | Olivia Harrison | Olivia Harrison | Aquellos Ojos Verdes – Olivia Harrison | |
| 1 Oct 2023 | Olivia Harrison | Los Panchos | Aquellos Ojos Verdes- Trio Los Panchos | Grandes Exitos Del Trio Los Panchos Vol. 3. Star Music. 1. |
| 1 Oct 2023 | Olivia Harrison | Ezekiel Arias | Nosotros | |
| 1 Oct 2023 | Olivia Harrison | Shivkumar Sharma, Brij Bushan Kabra, Hariprasad Chaurasia & Manikrao Popatkar | Bhoop-Jhapaal | Call of the Valley. HMV. 3. |
| 1 Oct 2023 | Olivia Harrison | Johann Sebastian Bach | Brandenburg Concerto No. 2 in F major, BWV 1047 (1st movement) | Orchestra: Academy of Ancient Music. Conductor: Christopher Hogwood. J.S. Bach: Brandenburg Concertos 1-6: Academy of Ancient Music/Hogwood. L'Oiseau-Lyre. 4. |
| 1 Oct 2023 | Olivia Harrison | Bulgarian State Radio & Television Female Vocal Choir & Trio Bulgarka | "Kalimankou Denkou" | Le Mystere des Voix Bulgares Vol. 1. Elektra Nonesuch Recors. 3. |
| 1 Oct 2023 | Olivia Harrison | Anoushka Shankar | Arpan (Offering) | Concert for George. Warner Strategic Marketing. 4. |
| 1 Oct 2023 | Olivia Harrison | Los Índios Tabajaras | "Maria Elena" | Maria Elena/Always in My Heart. Collectables Record Corp/BMG Special Products. 1. |
| 8 Oct 2023 | Fay Dowker | George Frideric Handel | Air with variations, The Harmonious Blacksmith (Suite No. 5 in E major) | Performer: Murray Perahia. Handel/Scarlatti: Murray Perahia. Sony Classical. 4. |
| 8 Oct 2023 | Fay Dowker | Ludwig van Beethoven | Violin Concerto (2nd movement) | Performer: Hilary Hahn. Orchestra: Baltimore Symphony Orchestra. Conductor: David Zinman. Sony Classical |
| 8 Oct 2023 | Fay Dowker | Richard Rodgers | "My Favorite Things" | Music arranger: John Coltrane. Ensemble: John Coltrane Quartet. My Favorite Things. Rhino Atlantic. 1. |
| 8 Oct 2023 | Fay Dowker | Dmitri Shostakovich | Prelude and Fugue in A major, Op. 87, No. 7 | Performer: Tatiana Nikolayeva. Shostakovich: 24 Preludes and Fugues Op. 87: Tatiana Nicolayeva. Hyperion. 13. |
| 8 Oct 2023 | Fay Dowker | Johann Sebastian Bach | "Wir setzen uns mit Tränen nieder" (St Matthew Passion) | Choir: Monteverdi Choir. Choir: London Oratory Junior Choir. Orchestra: English Baroque Soloists. Conductor: Sir John Eliot Gardiner. Bach: St. Matthew Passion. Archiv Produktion. 68. |
| 8 Oct 2023 | Fay Dowker | Natalie Merchant | "Which side are you on?" | The House Carpenter's Daughter. Myth America Records. 2. |
| 15 Oct 2023 | Brian Cox (actor) | Giuseppe Verdi | Grand March (Aida) | Ensemble: Band And State Trumpeters Of The Royal Horse Guards. Ensemble: The State Trumpeters of The Royal Horse Guards. The Band & State Trumpeters of The Royal Horse Guards. Tradition Records. 9. |
| 15 Oct 2023 | Brian Cox (actor) | Gustav Mahler | Symphony No. 5 in C♯ minor (4th movement) | Orchestra: Berliner Philharmoniker. Conductor: Claudio Abbado. Gustav Mahler: Symphonie No. 5. Deutsche Grammophon. 4. |
| 15 Oct 2023 | Brian Cox (actor) | Giacomo Puccini | "Un bel dì vedremo" (Madam Butterfly) | Orchestra: Philharmonia Orchestra. Singer: Maria Callas. Conductor: Tullio Serafin. Popular Music from TV Film and Opera. EMI Classics. 6. |
| 15 Oct 2023 | Brian Cox (actor) | Wolfgang Amadeus Mozart | Piano Concerto No. 21 in C major (2nd movement) | Performer: Arthur Rubinstein. Orchestra: RCA Victor Symphony Orchestra. Conductor: Alfred Wallenstein. RCA Red Seal |
| 15 Oct 2023 | Brian Cox (actor) | Felix Mendelssohn | Violn Concerto in E minor (1st movement) | Performer: Itzhak Perlman. Orchestra: Royal Concertgebouw Orchestra. Conductor: Bernard Haitink. Mendelssohn & Bruch: Violin Concertos. Warner Classics. 1. |
| 15 Oct 2023 | Brian Cox (actor) | Johann Sebastian Bach | Ciaconna (Partita No.2) | Performer: Hilary Hahn. Sony Classical |
| 15 Oct 2023 | Brian Cox (actor) | Joni Mitchell | "A Case Of You" (2021 remaster) | Singer: Joni Mitchell. The Reprise Albums (1968–1971). Rhino Records. 9. |
| 22 Oct 2023 | Black History Month | Henry Purcell | "Thy hand Belinda ... When I am laid in earth" (Dido and Aeneas) | Singer: Jessye Norman. Orchestra: English Chamber Orchestra. Conductor: Raymond Leppard. Decca. |
| 22 Oct 2023 | Black History Month | Florence Price | Symphony No. 1 in E minor (2nd movement: Largo, maestoso) | Orchestra: The Philadelphia Orchestra. Conductor: Yannick Nézet‐Séguin. Deutsche Grammophon. |
| 22 Oct 2023 | Black History Month | Taj Mahal | "Queen Bee" | Performer: Toumani Diabaté. Singer: Taj Mahal. Singer: Ramata Diakité. Hannibal Records. |
| 22 Oct 2023 | Black History Month | Trad. | "Deep River" | Music arranger: Samuel Coleridge-Taylor. Music arranger: Kanneh-Mason Trio. Performer: Sheku Kanneh‐Mason. Performer: Isata Kanneh‐Mason. Performer: Braimah Kanneh-Mason. Decca Music Group Ltd. |
| 22 Oct 2023 | Black History Month | YolanDa Brown | "Million Billion Love" | Performer: YolanDa Brown. Black Grape Records. |
| 22 Oct 2023 | Black History Month | Alfredo Catalani | "Ebben? Ne andrò lontana" (La Waly) | Singer: Wilhelmenia Fernandez. Orchestra: London Symphony Orchestra. Conductor: Vladimir Cosma. Milan. |
| 22 Oct 2023 | Black History Month | George Gershwin | "I loves you Porgy" | Singer: Nina Simone. Verve. |
| 22 Oct 2023 | Black History Month | Florence Price | "Dances in the Canebrakes" (Nimble Feet) | Music arranger: William Grant Still. Orchestra: Chicago Sinfonietta. Conductor: Mei-Ann Chen. Project W: Works by Diverse Women Composers. Cedille. 1. |
| 29 Oct 2023 | Chris Addison | Antonín Dvořák | Bagatelles Op. 47, No. 5 | Performer: Maria Milstein. Performer: Miguel da Silva. Ensemble: Busch Trio. Dvořák: Piano Quintets & Bagatelles. Alpha Classics. 8. |
| 29 Oct 2023 | Chris Addison | Benjamin Britten | "Dies Irae" (War Requiem) | Singer: Dietrich Fischer‐Dieskau. Choir: Bach Choir. Orchestra: London Symphony Orchestra. Conductor: Benjamin Britten Decca |
| 29 Oct 2023 | Chris Addison | Trad. | "Just as the Tide Was Flowing" | Music arranger: Eliza Carthy. Singer: Eliza Carthy. Anglicana. Topic. 2. |
| 29 Oct 2023 | Chris Addison | Gioachino Rossini | "O figlie amabili" (La Cenerentola) | Singer: Cecilia Bartoli. Singer: Fernanda Costa. Singer: Gloria Banditelli. Singer: Michele Pertusi. Choir: Coro del Teatro Comunale di Bologna. Orchestra: Orchestra del Teatro Comunale di Bologna. Conductor: Riccardo Chailly. Rossini: La Cenerentola. Decca Music Group Ltd. 5. |
| 29 Oct 2023 | Chris Addison | Trad. | Wallom Green (The English Dancing Master) | Music arranger: John Playford. Music arranger: Bjarte Eike. Ensemble: Barokksolistene. Director: Bjarte Eike. The Alehouse Sessions. RUBICON. 101. |
| 29 Oct 2023 | Chris Addison | Gustaf Nordqvist | Jul, jul, strålande jul | Choir: Adolf Fredriks Ungdomskör. Jul med Adolf Fredriks. Cupol. 6. |
| 29 Oct 2023 | Chris Addison | Wolfgang Amadeus Mozart | The Marriage of Figaro (Overture) | Orchestra and choir: MusicAeterna. Conductor: Teodor Currentzis. Sony Classical. |
| 5 Nov 2023 | Abdulrazak Gurnah | Wolfgang Amadeus Mozart | Sympnony No. 40 in G minor, K. 550, 1. Molto Allegro | Orchestra: Scottish Chamber Orchestra. Conductor: Charles Mackerras. Linn Records |
| 5 Nov 2023 | Abdulrazak Gurnah | Sidney Bechet & Claude Luter and his Orchestra | "Petite Fleur" | Petite Fleur. Vogue. 1. |
| 5 Nov 2023 | Abdulrazak Gurnah | Dmitiri Shostakovich | Symphony No. 7 in C major Op. 60, "The Leningrad" | Orchestra: Boston Symphony Orchestra. Conductor: Andris Nelsons. Shostakovich Symphonies Nos. 6 & 7. Deutsche Grammophon. 1. |
| 5 Nov 2023 | Abdulrazak Gurnah | Toumani Diabaté | Kaira | Kaira. Hannibal Records. 3. |
| 5 Nov 2023 | Abdulrazak Gurnah | Felix Mendelssohn | "Song Without Words" | Performer: Sheku Kanneh‐Mason. Performer: Isata Kanneh‐Mason. Song. Decca. 7. |
| 5 Nov 2023 | Abdulrazak Gurnah | Frédéric Chopin | Nocturne No. 4 in F major Op. 15, No. 1 | Performer: Martha Argerich. Argerich Plays Chopin. Deutsche Grammophon. 8. |
| 5 Nov 2023 | Abdulrazak Gurnah | Miles Davis | "Summertime" | Porgy and Bess. Columbia. 5. |
| 5 Nov 2023 | Abdulrazak Gurnah | Joaquín Rodrigo | Concierto de Aranjuez 1: Allegro Con Spirito | Performer: Miloš Karadaglić. Orchestra: London Philharmonic Orchestra. Conductor: Yannick Nézet‐Séguin. Aranjuez. Deutsche Grammophon. 1. |
| 12 Nov 2023 | Mali Morris | Antonio Vivaldi | "Nisi dominus" | Singer: Andreas Scholl. Orchestra: Australian Brandenburg Orchestra. Conductor: Paul Dyer. Vivaldi: Nisi Dominus/Motets/Strring Concertos/Salve Regina. Decca. 1. |
| 12 Nov 2023 | Mali Morris | Trad. | "Ar lan y mor" | Singer: Bryn Terfel. Orchestra: Welsh National Opera Orchestra. Conductor: Gareth Jones. We'll Keep a Welcome. Deutsche Grammophon. 2. |
| 12 Nov 2023 | Mali Morris | Johann Sebastian Bach | Cello Suite No.1 in G (Prelude) | Performer: Mstislav Rostropovich. Bach Cello Suites. Supraphon. 1. |
| 12 Nov 2023 | Mali Morris | Bob Dylan | Series of Dreams outtake from the Oh Mercy Sessions | Lyricist: Bob Dylan. Singer: Bob Dylan. The Bootleg Series 8: Telltale Signs. Columbia. 2. |
| 12 Nov 2023 | Mali Morris | Ludwig van Beethoven | String Quartet No. 13 in B♭ major, Op. 130, V. Cavatina | Performer: Talichovo kvarteto. Beethoven: Quartets Op. 130 & Op. 59 No. 2. La Dolce Voltra. 5. |
| 12 Nov 2023 | Mali Morris | Jonathan Richman | "No One Was Like Vermeer" | Performer: Tommy Larkins. Lyricist: Jonathan Richman. Singer: Jonathan Richman. Because Her Beauty is Raw and Wild. Vapor Records. 2. |
| 12 Nov 2023 | Mali Morris | Johann Sebastian Bach | "Widerstehe doch der Sunde" (Cantata, BWV.54) | Performer: Víkingur Ólafsson. Johann Sebastian Bach. DEUTSCHE GRAMMOPHON. 11. |
| 12 Nov 2023 | Mali Morris | Professor Longhair | "Mardi Gras in New Orleans" | Performer: Professor Longhair. Lyricist: Professor Longhair. Live on The Queen Mary. One Way Records. 1. |
| 19 Nov 2023 | Daniel Handler | Ludwig van Beethoven | Symphony No. 3 in E♭ major, Op. 55, Eroica (1st movement) | Orchestra: Berliner Philharmoniker. Conductor: Claudio Abbado. Beethoven: 9 Symphonies: Abbado, Berliner Philharmoniker. Deutsche Grammophon. 1. |
| 19 Nov 2023 | Daniel Handler | Alexander Scriabin | Piano Sonata No. 9, Op. 68 "Black Mass" | Performer: Vladimir Ashkenazy. Scriabin: Piano Sonatas Nos. 3, 4, 5 & 9. Decca Music Group Ltd. 8. |
| 19 Nov 2023 | Daniel Handler | Hector Berlioz | Harold in Italy (1st movement) | Performer: Tabea Zimmermann. Orchestra: London Symphony Orchestra. Conductor: Colin Davis. Berlioz Odyssey: The Complete Colin Davis Recordings. LSO Live. 418. |
| 19 Nov 2023 | Daniel Handler | Oskar Fried | Verklärte Nacht, Op. 9 | Singer: Christine Rice. Singer: Stuart Skelton. Orchestra: BBC Symphony Orchestra. Conductor: Edward Gardner. Chandos. |
| 19 Nov 2023 | Daniel Handler | Morton Feldman | The Viola In My Life (1st movement) | Performer: Marek Konstantynowicz. Ensemble: Cikada. Conductor: Christian Eggen. Feldman: The Viola In My Life I-IV. ECM New Series. 1. |
| 19 Nov 2023 | Daniel Handler | Oliver Triendl | Bagatelle Op. No. 47, No. 1, Allegretto scherzando | Dvorak String Quartets. CPO. 12. |
| 26 Nov 2023 | Kevin O'Hare | Pyotr Ilyich Tchaikovsky | The Sleeping Beauty (Prologue) | Orchestra: London Symphony Orchestra. Conductor: André Previn. Warner Classics |
| 26 Nov 2023 | Kevin O'Hare | John Kander | "Maybe This Time" (Cabaret) | Lyricist: Fred Ebb. Singer: Jessie Buckley. Ensemble: 2021 London Cast of Cabaret. Cabaret (2021 London Cast Recording). Decca (UMO) (Classics). 9. |
| 26 Nov 2023 | Kevin O'Hare | Sergey Rachmaninov | Rhapsody on a theme of Paganini | Performer: Sir Stephen Hough. Orchestra: Dallas Symphony Orchestra. Conductor: Andrew Litton. Rachmaninov: The Piano Concertos: Hough/Dallas Symphony Orchestra/Litton. Hyperion. |
| 26 Nov 2023 | Kevin O'Hare | Giacomo Puccini | "O mio babbino caro" (Gianni Schicchi) | Singer: Kiri Te Kanawa. Orchestra: London Philharmonic Orchestra. Conductor: John Pritchard. Kiri. EMI. 7. |
| 26 Nov 2023 | Kevin O'Hare | Thomas Adès | "Paradiso" (Dante) | Choir: Los Angeles Master Chorale. Orchestra: Los Angeles Philharmonic. Conductor: Gustavo Dudamel. Thomas Adès: Dante. Nonesuch. 1. |
| 26 Nov 2023 | Kevin O'Hare | Anna Clyne | Breathing Statues | Ensemble: Calidore String Quartet. |
| 26 Nov 2023 | Kevin O'Hare | Gabriel Fauré | "Pie Jesu" (Requiem, Op. 48) | Singer: Barbara Bonney. Orchestra: Philharmonia Orchestra. Conductor: Michel Legrand. Teldec |
| 3 Dec 2023 | Walter Murch | Frédéric Chopin | Waltz No. 5 in A♭ major, Op. 42 | Performer: Симон Барер. Simon Barere: The Complete HMV Recordings. Apr. 9. |
| 3 Dec 2023 | Walter Murch | Ferde Grofé | Grand Canyon suite Part 111: On the Trail | Orchestra: New York Philharmonic. Conductor: Leonard Bernstein. CBS. |
| 3 Dec 2023 | Walter Murch | Pierre Henry | Symphonie pour un homme seul | Composer: Pierre Schaeffer. Collection Musique Concrète, Vol. 2. Sinetone AMR. 5. |
| 3 Dec 2023 | Walter Murch | Trad. | Gregorian chant – Vêpres de la Trinité – Antienne: Gloria laudis + Psalm 111 | Ensemble: Choeur des Moines de L'Abbaye de Solesmes. Accord. |
| 3 Dec 2023 | Walter Murch | Ludwig van Beethoven | Symphony No. 6 in F major, Op. 68, Pastoral | Conductor: Osmo Vänskä. Orchestra: Minnesota Orchestra. Beethoven: The Symphonies: Minnesota Orchestra, Osmo Vanska. BIS. 1. |
| 3 Dec 2023 | Walter Murch | Giovanni Battista Pergolesi | Stabat mater in F minor (opening) | Singer: Sandrine Piau. Singer: Christopher Lowrey. Conductor: Christophe Rousset. Ensemble: Les Talens Lyriques. ALPHA |
| 3 Dec 2023 | Walter Murch | Richard Wagner | "The Ride of the Valkyries" (Die Walkure) | Conductor: Georg Solti. Orchestra: Vienna Philharmonic. Wagner: Der Ring des Nibelungen (orchestral excerpts): Wiener Philharmoniker, So. Decca. 1. |
| 3 Dec 2023 | Walter Murch | François Couperin | "Le Tic Toc Choc ou Les Maillotins" | Performer: Grigory Sokolov. Grigory Sokolov Live in Paris. Ideale Audience. 1. |
| 10 Dec 2023 | Dame Ottoline Leyser | Giovanni Pierluigi da Palestrina | "Super flumina Babylonis" | Ensemble: The Sixteen. Conductor: Harry Christophers. CORO |
| 10 Dec 2023 | Dame Ottoline Leyser | Wolfgang Amadeus Mozart | Don Giovanni (Act II Finale) | Singer: Umberto Chiummo. Singer: Bo Skovhus. Singer: Alessandro Corbelli. Orchestra: Scottish Chamber Orchestra. Conductor: Charles Mackerras. Mozart: The Great Operas. Telarc. 165. |
| 10 Dec 2023 | Dame Ottoline Leyser | Claude Debussy | "La fille aux cheveux de lin" (Preludes, Book 1) | Performer: Jean-Efflam Bavouzet. Debussy: Complete works for piano Vol. 1: Bavouzet. Chandos. 8. |
| 10 Dec 2023 | Dame Ottoline Leyser | Camille Saint‐Saëns | Introduction and Rondo Capriccioso Op. 28 | Performer: Nicola Benedetti. Orchestra: Royal Liverpool Philharmonic Orchestra. Conductor: Vasily Petrenko. Fantasie. Decca. 3. |
| 10 Dec 2023 | Dame Ottoline Leyser | Sergey Rachmaninov | Piano Concerto No. 2 in C minor, Op. 18 (1st movement) | Performer: Krystian Zimerman. Orchestra: Boston Symphony Orchestra. Conductor: Seiji Ozawa. Rachmaninov: Piano Concertos Nos. 1&2 Zimerman/Boston Symphony Orchestra/ Ozawa. Deutsche Grammaphon. 4. |
| 10 Dec 2023 | Dame Ottoline Leyser | Arthur Sullivan | The Elements | Lyricist: Tom Lehrer. Singer: Tom Lehrer. Dr Demento's 30th Anniversary Collection. Rhino. 3. |
| 10 Dec 2023 | Dame Ottoline Leyser | Ralph Vaughan Williams | Fantasia on a Theme by Thomas Tallis | Orchestra: London Philharmonic Orchestra. Conductor: Sir Roger Norrington. Decca. |
| 31 Dec 2023 | Johnny Flynn | Gabriel Fauré | Cantique de Jean Racine, Op. 11 for chorus and organ, or harmonium | Performer: Stephen Cleobury. Choir: Choir of St John’s College, Cambridge. Conductor: George Guest. Faure: Requiem, Durufle: Requiem, Poulenc: Motets. DECCA. 8. |
| 31 Dec 2023 | Johnny Flynn | Johann Sebastian Bach | Unaccompanied Cello Suite No. 4 in E♭ major, BWV 1010: Prelude | Performer: Yo‐Yo Ma. Six Evolutions. Sony Classical. 1. |
| 31 Dec 2023 | Johnny Flynn | Stephen Sondheim | "Send in the Clowns" (Reprise) | Singer: Siân Phillips. A Little Night Music. Jay Records. 19. |
| 31 Dec 2023 | Johnny Flynn | The Watersons | The Good Old Way | Ensemble: The Watersons. Mighty River of Song. Topic Records. 7. |
| 31 Dec 2023 | Johnny Flynn | Trad. | "Everytime I feel the Spirit" | Performer: Alan Booth. Singer: Paul Robeson. The Peace Arch Concerts. Folk Era Records. 4. |
| 31 Dec 2023 | Johnny Flynn | Michael Hurley | "The Tea Song" | First Songs. Folkways Records. 5. |
| 31 Dec 2023 | Johnny Flynn | Georges Bizet | "Au fond du temple saint" (The Pearl Fishers) | Singer: Jussi Björling. Singer: Robert Merrill. Orchestra: RCA Victor Symphony Orchestra. Conductor: Renato Cellini. The Pearl Fishers Duet and Other famous duets and scenes. 1. |
| 31 Dec 2023 | Johnny Flynn | Robert Johnson | "Come On In My Kitchen" | King of the Delta Blues Singers'. Columbia Records. 3. |

== 2024 ==
| Date | Guest | Composer | Title | Performer |
|---|---|---|---|---|
| 7 Jan 2024 | Nina Stibbe | Johannes Brahms | Piano Concerto No. 2 in B♭ (1st movement) | Performer: Lars Vogt. Orchestra: Royal Northern Sinfonia. Brahms: Piano Concerto No. 2 & Handel Variations. Ondine. 1. |
| 7 Jan 2024 | Nina Stibbe | George Frideric Handel | "Eternal source of light divine" (Birthday Ode for Queen Anne) | Singer: Elin Manahan Thomas. Performer: David Blackadder. Orchestra: Orchestra of the Age of Enlightenment. Conductor: Harry Christophers. Eternal Light. HELIODOR |
| 7 Jan 2024 | Nina Stibbe | Jake Thackray | "Remember Bethlehem" | Jake in a Box: the EMI Recordings 1967–1976 Box Set. EMI. 14. |
| 7 Jan 2024 | Nina Stibbe | Frank Loesser | "Sit Down, You're Rockin' the Boat" (Guys and Dolls) | Singer: Stubby Kaye. Choir: Members of the Cast. Legendary Broadway Musicals, Vol. 9. Documents. 14. |
| 7 Jan 2024 | Nina Stibbe | Wolfgang Amadeus Mozart | "Bei Männern" (The Magic Flute) | Singer: Elisabeth Norberg-Schulz. Singer: Wilfried Gahmlich. Conductor: Michael Halász. Orchestra: Budapest Failoni Chamber Orchestra. Choir: Hungarian Festival Choir. Mozart: Zauberflöte (Die) (The Magic Flute). Naxos. 1. |
| 7 Jan 2024 | Nina Stibbe | Karl Jenkins | Better is Peace from The Armed Man: A Mass for Peace | Choir: Hertfordshire Chorus. Conductor: David Temple. Orchestra: The London Orchestra da Camera. The Armed Man. Signum Classics. 13. |
| 7 Jan 2024 | Nina Stibbe | Paul McCartney | "Junk" | McCartney. Paul McCartney Archive Collection/MPL. 6. |
| 7 Jan 2024 | Nina Stibbe | Benjamin Clementine | Adios | Performer: Benjamin Clementine. At Least For Now. Universal Music Division Barclay. 4. |
| 14 Jan 2024 | Merlin Sheldrake | Johann Sebastian Bach | Kommt ihr Töchter helft mir klagen (St. Matthew Passion) | Choir: Choir of King’s College, Cambridge. Choir: King's College School Choir. Ensemble: Academy of Ancient Music. Conductor: Stephen Cleobury. Bach: St. Matthew Passion. Kings College Cambridge. 101. |
| 14 Jan 2024 | Merlin Sheldrake | Frédéric Chopin | Nocturne in G major, Op. 37, No. 2 | Performer: Nelson Freire. Nelson Freire: Chopin, The Nocturnes. Decca. 2. |
| 14 Jan 2024 | Merlin Sheldrake | Thomas Tallis | Miserere nostri | Choir: The Rodolfus Choir. Conductor: Ralph Allwood. Time and Its Passing. Signum Records. 16. |
| 14 Jan 2024 | Merlin Sheldrake | The Babenzélé people of The Central African Republic | Women gathering mushrooms | The Extraordinary Music of the Babenzélé Pygmies. Ellipsis Arts. 1. |
| 14 Jan 2024 | Merlin Sheldrake | Bill Evans & Jim Hall | "My Funny Valentine" | Undercurrent. Green Corner. 1. |
| 14 Jan 2024 | Merlin Sheldrake | Henry Purcell | "Music for a while" (Oedipus) | Singer: Alfred Deller. Performer: William Christie. Performer: Wieland Kuijken. Purcell: Music for a While. HARMONIA MUNDI. 12. |
| 21 Jan 2024 | Lorna Dawson | Trad. | "Ae Fond Kiss" | Performer: Nicola Benedetti. Music arranger: Paul Campbell. Orchestra: BBC Scottish Symphony Orchestra. Conductor: Rory Macdonald. Homecoming – A Scottish Fantasy. Decca Music Group Ltd. 5. |
| 21 Jan 2024 | Lorna Dawson | Maurice Ravel | "Pavane pour une infante défunte" | Performer: Bertrand Chamayou. Ravel: Complete Works for Solo Piano. Erato/Warner Classics. 2. |
| 21 Jan 2024 | Lorna Dawson | Johann Pachelbel | Canon in D | Ensemble: The English Concert. Conductor: Trevor Pinnock. Pachebel: Canon & Gigue/Handel: The Arrival of the Queen of Sheba. ARCHIV. 1. |
| 21 Jan 2024 | Lorna Dawson | Edward Elgar | Cello concerto in E minor, Op. 85 | Performer: Jacqueline du Pré. Orchestra: London Symphony Orchestra. Conductor: John Barbirolli. British Composers: Sir John Barbirolli conducts Elgar. Warner Classics. 6. |
| 21 Jan 2024 | Lorna Dawson | Wolfgang Amadeus Mozart | Requiem in D minor K.626 (Lacrimosa) | Choir: Swedish Radio Choir. Orchestra: Berliner Philharmoniker. Conductor: Claudio Abbado. Requiem. DG. 8. |
| 21 Jan 2024 | Lorna Dawson | Nina Simone | "Feeling Good" | I Put A Spell On You. Silva Screen. 7. |
| 21 Jan 2024 | Lorna Dawson | Peter Maxwell Davies | "Farewell to Stromness" | Performer: Valentina Lisitsa. Chilled Piano Volume 4. Decca. 1. |
| 28 Jan 2024 | Neil Hannon | Giacomo Puccini | "Chi il bel sogno di Doretta" (La rondine) | Singer: Kiri Te Kanawa. Orchestra: London Philharmonic Orchestra. Conductor: John Pritchard. EMI. |
| 28 Jan 2024 | Neil Hannon | Igor Stravinsky | Petrouchka (Scene 1) | Orchestra: New York Philharmonic. Conductor: Leonard Bernstein. Stravinsky: Petrouchka; Pulcinella Suite [Great Performances]. Sony Classical. 1. |
| 28 Jan 2024 | Neil Hannon | Frédéric Chopin | Nocturne in E♭ major, Op. 9, No. 2 | Performer: Vladimir Ashkenazy. Chopin: The Solo Piano Works: Ashkenazy. London. 2. |
| 28 Jan 2024 | Neil Hannon | Kate Bush | "Cloudbusting" | Singer: Kate Bush. Noble & Brite Limited. |
| 28 Jan 2024 | Neil Hannon | Michael Nyman | Prawn-watching (A Zed and Two Noughts) | Ensemble: Michael Nyman Band. Conductor: Michael Nyman. Decca Music Group Ltd. |
| 28 Jan 2024 | Neil Hannon | Neil Hannon | "Our Mutual Friend" | Ensemble: The Divine Comedy. Conductor: Joby Talbot. Absent Friends. Parlophone UK. 7. |
| 28 Jan 2024 | Neil Hannon | Maurice Ravel | String Quartet in F (1st movement) | Ensemble: Paganini Quartet. BNF. |
| 28 Jan 2024 | Neil Hannon | Nino Rota | La Dolce Vita – opening credits | Orchestra: Carlo Savina and His Orchestra. Conductor: Carlo Savina. CAM. |
| 28 Jan 2024 | Neil Hannon | Scott Walker | "Montague Terrace" (In Blue) | Singer: Scott Walker. Conductor: Wally Stott. Scott. UMC (Universal Music Catalogue). 2. |
| 4 Feb 2024 | Louise Welsh | Gioachino Rossini | William Tell (Overture) | Orchestra: Orchestra of the Academy of Santa Cecilia, Rome. Conductor: Sir Antonio Pappano. Rossini: William Tell: Antonio Pappano. EMI Classics. 1. |
| 4 Feb 2024 | Louise Welsh | Giuseppe Verdi | Rigoletto (Act 3) | Singer: Edita Gruberová. Singer: Luciano Pavarotti. Singer: Ingvar Wixell. Orchestra: Vienna Philharmonic. Conductor: Riccardo Chailly. Rigoletto DVD. Deutsche Grammophon. 31. |
| 4 Feb 2024 | Louise Welsh | Bernard Herrmann | Theme from Taxi Driver | Performer: Ronnie Lang. Music arranger: Dave Blume. Conductor: Dave Blume. Taxi Driver. Arista. 14. |
| 4 Feb 2024 | Louise Welsh | Chris Watson | The Lapaich | Performer: Chris Watson. Weather Report. 1. |
| 4 Feb 2024 | Louise Welsh | Claude Debussy | Dialogue du vent et de la mer (La mer) | Orchestra: Los Angeles Philharmonic. Conductor: Carlo Maria Giulini. Giulini in America: Los Angeles Philharmonic/Giulini. Deutsche Grammaphon. 3. |
| 4 Feb 2024 | Louise Welsh | Stuart MacRae | Anthropocene opera: Ice's Aria | Performer: Orchestra of Scottish Opera. Librettist: Louise Welsh. Conductor: Stuart Stratford. Singer: Jennifer France. Singer: Jeni Bern. Anthropocene. 1. |
| 4 Feb 2024 | Louise Welsh | Henry Purcell | "When I am laid in earth" (Dido & Aeneas) | Singer: Anna Prohaska. Orchestra: Il Giardino Armonico. Conductor: Giovanni Antonini. Serpent and Fire: Arias for Dido and Cleopatra. Alpha. 18. |
| 4 Feb 2024 | Louise Welsh | Anna Thorvaldsdottir | In the Light of Air, III: Existence | Ensemble: International Contemporary Ensemble (ICE). ICE performs Anna Thorvaldsdottir. Sono Luminus. 3. |
| 11 Feb 2024 | Raymond Blanc | Ludwig van Beethoven | Piano Sonata in C♯ minor "Moonlight" (1st movement) | Performer: Alice Sara Ott. Beethoven. Deutsche Grammophon (DG). 4. |
| 11 Feb 2024 | Raymond Blanc | Léo Ferré | "Avec le temps" | Singer: Léo Ferré. Thank You Ferre. Universal Music Division Barclay. 13. |
| 11 Feb 2024 | Raymond Blanc | Remo Giazotto | Adagio in G minor | Performer: Håkan Hardenberger. Performer: Simon Preston. Famous Classical Trumpet Concertos. Decca Music Group Ltd. 19. |
| 11 Feb 2024 | Raymond Blanc | Leonard Cohen | "Hallelujah" | Singer: Leonard Cohen. Various Positions. Columbia/Legacy. 5. |
| 11 Feb 2024 | Raymond Blanc | Antonio Vivaldi | The Four Seasons – Winter (1st movement) | Performer: Vanessa‐Mae. Music arranger: Pamela Nicholson. Music arranger: Vanessa‐Mae. Ensemble: Laureate. The Original Four Seasons and The Devil's Trill Sonata. Parlophone UK. 10. |
| 11 Feb 2024 | Raymond Blanc | Arvo Pärt | Spiegel im Spiegel | Performer: Tasmin Little. Performer: Martin Roscoe. Arvo Part Fratres. EMI. 4. |
| 11 Feb 2024 | Raymond Blanc | Giuseppe Verdi | "Addio, del passato" (La traviata) | Singer: Ermonela Jaho. Orchestra: Orquestra de la Comunitat Valenciana. Conductor: Andrea Battistoni. Anima Rara. Opera Rara. 1. |
| 18 Feb 2024 | Ray Cooper | Johann Sebastian Bach | Partita No. 3 in E major for violin, BWV 1006 (Prelude) | Performer: Isabelle Faust. J.S. Bach: Sonatas & Partitas. Isabelle Faust. Harmonia Mundi. 10. |
| 18 Feb 2024 | Ray Cooper | Gerry Goffin | "Take a Giant Step" | Composer: Carole King. Singer: Taj Mahal. The Essential. Legacy Recordings. 7. |
| 18 Feb 2024 | Ray Cooper | Dmitri Shostakovich | Foxtrot [Blues] (Suite for Jazz Band No. 1) | Orchestra: Royal Concertgebouw Orchestra. Conductor: Riccardo Chailly. Shostakovich: The Jazz Album – Bräutigam, Masseurs. Decca. 3. |
| 18 Feb 2024 | Ray Cooper | Olivier Messiaen | Turangalîla-Symphonie (1st movement) | Orchestra: London Symphony Orchestra. Conductor: André Previn. Turangalila Symphony/ Concert Champetre/ Concerto in G etc. Warner Classics. 1. |
| 18 Feb 2024 | Ray Cooper | Elton John | "Sixty Years On" | Composer: Bernie Taupin. Music arranger: Paul Buckmaster. Singer: Elton John. To Be Continued.... EMI. 10. |
| 18 Feb 2024 | Ray Cooper | John Tavener | The Protecting veil for cello and string orchestra [1987]: opening | Performer: Steven Isserlis. Orchestra: London Symphony Orchestra. Conductor: Gennady Nikolayevich Rozhdestvensky. The Protecting Veil. VIRGIN CLASSICS. 1. |
| 18 Feb 2024 | Ray Cooper | George Harrison | "Here Comes the Sun | Ensemble: The Beatles. Abbey Road (Super Deluxe Edition). UMC (Universal Music Catalogue). 7. |
| 25 Feb 2024 | Michael Winterbottom | Robert Schumann | Piano Quintet in E♭ major, Op. 44 (2nd movement) | Performer: Martha Argerich. Performer: Dora Schwarzberg. Performer: Lucia Hall. Performer: Nobuko Imai. Performer: Mischa Maisky. Schumann: Chamber Works: Martha Argerich. EMI Classics. |
| 25 Feb 2024 | Michael Winterbottom | Johann Sebastian Bach | St John Passion: Part 1; Herr, unser Herrscher (Chorus) | Orchestra: Collegium Vocale Gent. Conductor: Philippe Herreweghe. Orchestra: Collegium Vocale Gent Orchestra. Bach: Johannes-Passion, BWV 245. PHI. |
| 25 Feb 2024 | Michael Winterbottom | Michael Nyman | "Debbie" | Wonderland Original Motion Picture Soundtrack. Michael Nyman Records. 5. |
| 25 Feb 2024 | Michael Winterbottom | Lovie Austin | "Downhearted Blues" | Lyricist: Alberta Hunter. Singer: Alberta Hunter. Alberta Hunter Vol. 4 (1927-c. 1946). Document Records. 11. |
| 25 Feb 2024 | Michael Winterbottom | Max Richter | "On the Nature of Daylight" | Orchestra: Max Richter Orchestra. Conductor: Lorenz Dangel. The Blue Notebooks. DG. 2. |
| 25 Feb 2024 | Michael Winterbottom | Ella Fitzgerald | "The Man I Love" | Ella Fitzgerald Sings the George and Ira Gershwin Songbook. Verve. 14. |
| 25 Feb 2024 | Michael Winterbottom | Melissa Parmenter | Ostuni | Performer: Melissa Parmenter. Messapica. Globe Productions. 5. |
| 31 Mar 2024 | John Krebs | Arcangelo Corelli | Concerto Grosso in G minor, Op. 6, No. 8, Christmas Concerto | Ensemble: The English Concert. Conductor: Trevor Pinnock. Corelli: Concerti Grossi Op. 6. Archiv. 7–12. |
| 31 Mar 2024 | John Krebs | Robert Schumann | Papillons, Op. 2 | Performer: Nelson Freire. DECCA. |
| 31 Mar 2024 | John Krebs | Wolfgang Amadeus Mozart | Piano Concerto No. 27 in B♭, K. 595 (3rd movemenvt) | Orchestra: Chamber Orchestra of Europe. Conductor: Piotr Anderszewski. Mozart: Piano Concertos Nos 25 & 27. Warner Classics. 106. |
| 31 Mar 2024 | John Krebs | Joseph Haydn | "Mit Staunen sieht das Wunderwerk" (The Creation) | Singer: Barbara Bonney. Choir: Stuttgart Radio Choir. Orchestra: Stuttgart Radio Symphony Orchestra. Conductor: Neville Marriner. Haydn: Die Schöpfung. Warner Classics. 5. |
| 31 Mar 2024 | John Krebs | Franz Schubert | Licht und Liebe, D.352 | Performer: Gerald Moore. Singer: Janet Baker. Singer: Dietrich Fischer‐Dieskau. Schubert: Duets. Deutsche Grammophon (DG). 6. |
| 31 Mar 2024 | John Krebs | Arthur Sullivan | "When I was a lad" (H.M.S. Pinafore) | Librettist: William Gilbert. Singer: Richard Suart. Choir: Welsh National Opera Chorus. Orchestra: Welsh National Opera Orchestra. Conductor: Charles Mackerras. Gilbert and Sullivan: Highlights from the Mikado, the Pirates of Penznce, HMS Pinafore. Telarc. 1. |
| 31 Mar 2024 | John Krebs | Wolfgang Amadeus Mozart | Adagio in F major, K. Anh. 94 | Performer: Sabine Meyer. Ensemble: Trio di Clarone. Mozart: Kammermusik mit Klarinette. EMI. 1. |
| 10 Mar 2024 | Mark Cousins – Sound of Cinema Sunday | Donna McKevitt | Rilke from The Story of Looking soundtrack | The Story of Looking film soundtrack. 1. |
| 10 Mar 2024 | Mark Cousins – Sound of Cinema Sunday | Helen Traubel & José Ferrer | Leg of Mutton Rag | Vintage Hollywood Classics Vol 15 Lulu's Back inTown! Magic Movie Moments. Jube. 25. |
| 10 Mar 2024 | Mark Cousins – Sound of Cinema Sunday | Doris Day & FrankDeVol and His Orchestra | Whatever Will Be, Will Be (Que Sera Sera) | Doris Day: Her Greatest Songs. Columbia. 4. |
| 10 Mar 2024 | Mark Cousins – Sound of Cinema Sunday | Elisabeth Lutyens | The Skull Suite: Opening Titles | Performer: BBC Symphony Orchestra. Conductor: Jac van Steen. Elisabeth Lutyens: Love from a stranger 4 British Film Scores. NMC. 15. |
| 10 Mar 2024 | Mark Cousins – Sound of Cinema Sunday | This Mortal Coil | "Song to a Siren" | It'll End in Tears. Capriccio. 2. |
| 17 Mar 2024 | Helena Newman | Johann Sebastian Bach | "Wer hat dich so geschlagen" (St John Passion) | Choir: Monteverdi Choir. Orchestra: English Baroque Soloists. Conductor: Sir John Eliot Gardiner. Bach: St. John Passion. Archiv Produktion. 11. |
| 17 Mar 2024 | Helena Newman | Johann Strauss II | Roses from the South – Waltz | Orchestra: Chicago Symphony Orchestra. Conductor: Fritz Reiner. RCA Living Stereo. |
| 17 Mar 2024 | Helena Newman | Frédéric Chopin | Etude in C major "Waterfall" Op. 10, No. 1 | Performer: Maurizio Pollini. Chopin: Etudes. Deutsche Grammophon (DG). 1. |
| 17 Mar 2024 | Helena Newman | Richard Strauss | "Im Abendrot" (from Four Last Songs) | Singer: Jessye Norman. Orchestra: Leipzig Gewandhaus Orchestra. Conductor: Kurt Masur. |
| 17 Mar 2024 | Helena Newman | Ludwig van Beethoven | Cavatina (String Quartet in B♭ Op. 130) | Ensemble: Busch Quartet. Beethoven: The Late String Quartets. Warner Classics. 9. |
| 17 Mar 2024 | Helena Newman | Wolfgang Amadeus Mozart | Pa-, pa-, pa-, pa- (The Magic Flute) | Singer: Michael Kraus. Singer: Lotte Leitner. Orchestra: Vienna Philharmonic. Conductor: Georg Solti. Mozart: Die Zauberflöte. Decca Music Group Ltd. 35. |
| 17 Mar 2024 | Helena Newman | Arnold Schoenberg | Verklärte Nacht (4th movement) | Performer: Janine Jansen. Performer: Boris Brovtsyn. Performer: Amihai Grosz. Performer: Maxim Rysanov. Performer: Torleif Thedéen. Performer: Jens Peter Maintz. Schubert: String Quintet |
| 17 Mar 2024 | Helena Newman | Franz Schubert | Piano Quintet in A "The Trout" (4th movement) | Performer: Samuel Rhodes. Performer: Georg Hörtnagel. Ensemble: Beaux Arts Trio. Schubert: Trout Quintet / Beethoven: Piano Trio No.5 "Ghost". Decca Music Group Ltd. 4. |
| 7 Apr 2024 | David Mitchell | Jean Sibelius | Andante festivo | Orchestra: Lahti Symphony Orchestra. Conductor: Osmo Vänskä. Snofrid – Cantatas and Orchestral Works. BIS. 9. |
| 7 Apr 2024 | David Mitchell | Felix Rösch | "In Memory Of A Honey Bee" | Performer: Matija Strniša. Ensemble: Mondëna Quartet. Fragmente. SilentGreen Records. 4. |
| 7 Apr 2024 | David Mitchell | Nikolai Rimsky-Korsakov | "Flight of the Bumble Bee" | Performer: Adam Gyorgy. Music arranger: Sergey Rachmaninov. Karmatronic Sound Mgmt, LLC. |
| 7 Apr 2024 | David Mitchell | Anon. | Hanacpachap cussicuinin | Singer: Grace Davidson. Ensemble: Ex Cathedra. Conductor: Jeffrey Skidmore. Moon, Sun & All Things: Baroque Music from Latin America 2. Hyperion. 1. |
| 7 Apr 2024 | David Mitchell | Mark O'Connor | Appalachia Waltz | Performer: Yo‐Yo Ma. Essential Yo-Yo Ma. Sony Classical. 6. |
| 7 Apr 2024 | David Mitchell | Johnny Flynn | "The Water" | Singer: Johnny Flynn. Singer: Laura Marling. Been Listening. Transgressive. 7. |
| 7 Apr 2024 | David Mitchell | Anaïs Mitchell | Wedding Song (Hadestown) | Ensemble: Original Broadcast Cast. Hadestown (Original Broadway Cast Recording). Sing It Again Records. 4. |
| 7 Apr 2024 | David Mitchell | Christoph Willibald Gluck | Mélodie de Gluck | Performer: James Rhodes. Music arranger: Giovanni Sgambati. James Rhodes: Five. SIGNUM. 13. |
| 7 Apr 2024 | David Mitchell | Bill Evans | "Peace Piece" | Performer: Bill Evans. Everybody Digs Bill Evans. Riverside. 7. |
| 7 Apr 2024 | David Mitchell | Claude Debussy | "De l'aube à midi sur la mer" (La Mer) | Orchestra: London Symphony Orchestra. Conductor: François‐Xavier Roth. Debussy: La mer, Prélude à l'après-midi d'un faune – Ravel: Rapsodie espagnole. Lso Live. 6. |
| 7 Apr 2024 | David Mitchell | Benjamin Britten | Corpus Christi Carol | Composer: Jeff Buckley. Performer: Jeff Buckley. Grace. Sony Music Entertainment UK Ltd. 8. |
| 7 Apr 2024 | David Mitchell | Hildegard von Bingen | "Quia ergo femina mortem instruxit" | Ensemble: Ensemble for Medieval Music. deutsche harmonia mundi. |
| 14 Apr 2024 | Professor Sue Black | George Frideric Handel | For unto us a child is born (Messiah) | Choir: The English Concert Choir. Orchestra: The English Concert. Conductor: John Nelson. |
| 14 Apr 2024 | Professor Sue Black | Jeremiah Clarke | Trumpet Voluntary in D major transc. Preston | Performer: Simon Preston. |
| 14 Apr 2024 | Professor Sue Black | Trad. | "Wha Wadna Fecht for Charlie" | Ensemble: The Corries. |
| 14 Apr 2024 | Professor Sue Black | George Gershwin | "Rhapsody in Blue" | Performer: Wayne Marshall. Orchestra: Aalborg Symfoniorkester. Conductor: Wayne Marshall. |
| 14 Apr 2024 | Professor Sue Black | Edward Elgar | Enigma Variations, Op. 36 (Variation 9, "Nimrod") | Orchestra: London Symphony Orchestra. Conductor: Adrian Boult. |
| 14 Apr 2024 | Professor Sue Black | Johann Sebastian Bach | "Jesu, Joy of Man's Desiring" (from Cantata No. 147) | Choir: Choir of King's College, Cambridge. Orchestra: Academy of St Martin in the Fields. Conductor: Sir David Willcocks |
| 14 Apr 2024 | Professor Sue Black | Trad. | "Mist Covered Mountains of Home" | Ensemble: Celtic Fiddle Festival. |
| 14 Apr 2024 | Professor Sue Black | Felix Mendelssohn | The Hebrides, Op. 26 | Orchestra: City of Birmingham Symphony Orchestra. Conductor: Edward Gardner. |
| 14 Apr 2024 | Professor Sue Black | Lathallan School Pipe Band | Highland Cathedral | |
| 14 Apr 2024 | Professor Sue Black | George Frideric Handel | "The Arrival of the Queen of Sheba" (from Solomon) | Performer: Jeremy Filsell. |
| 21 Apr 2024 | Sathnam Sanghera | Bob Montgomery | "Misty Blue" | Lyricist: Bob Montgomery. Phenomenon (Music from the Motion Picture). Reprise. 9. |
| 21 Apr 2024 | Sathnam Sanghera | Claude Debussy | "Prelude a l'apres-midi d'un faune2 | Performer: Emmanuel Pahud. Orchestra: Berliner Philharmoniker. Conductor: Claudio Abbado. DG. |
| 21 Apr 2024 | Sathnam Sanghera | Nusrat Fateh Ali Khan | "Koi Bole Ram Ram" | Performer: Nusrat Fateh Ali Khan. The Best of Nusrat Fateh Ali Khan. Tehuti. 13. |
| 21 Apr 2024 | Sathnam Sanghera | Billy Strayhorn | "Lush Life" | Performer: John Coltrane. John Coltrane and Johnny Hartman. Verve Reissues. 4. |
| 21 Apr 2024 | Sathnam Sanghera | Nils Frahm | "My Friend the Forest" | Performer: Nils Frahm. All Melody. Erased Tapes. 4. |
| 21 Apr 2024 | Sathnam Sanghera | Bob Telson | "Calling You" (Bagdad Café) | Composer: Various Artists. Performer: Renaud Capuçon. Lyricist: Bob Telson. Singer: Nolwenn Leroy. Orchestra: Brussels Philharmonic. Conductor: Stéphane Denève. Cinema. Warner Classics. 11. |
| 21 Apr 2024 | Sathnam Sanghera | Taylor McFerrin | "Decisions" | Performer: Taylor McFerrin. Performer: Emily King. Brainfeeder. |
| 28 Apr 2024 | Edith Hall | George Frideric Handel | "Dead March" (Saul) | Ensemble: London Early Opera. Director: Bridget Cunningham. |
| 28 Apr 2024 | Edith Hall | Nikos Gatsos | "Mana mou Ellas" | Performer: Stavros Xarchakos. Performer: George Dalaras. |
| 28 Apr 2024 | Edith Hall | Enoch Mankayi Sontonga | "Nkosi Sikelel iAfrika" | Music aranger: George Fenton. Singer: Thuli Dumakude. |
| 28 Apr 2024 | Edith Hall | Franz Schubert | Piano Trio in E♭ major, D.929: II: Andante con moto | Performer: The Florestan Trio. |
| 28 Apr 2024 | Edith Hall | Joan Baez | "Diamonds and Rust" | Singer: Joan Baez. |
| 28 Apr 2024 | Edith Hall | Ludwig van Beethoven | Piano Concerto No. 5 in E♭ major, Op. 73 (3rd movement) | Performer: Krystian Zimerman. Orchestra: Vienna Philharmonic. Conductor: Leonard Bernstein. |
| 28 Apr 2024 | Edith Hall | Wolfgang Amadeus Mozart | Don Giovanni (act 2) | Singer: Richard Stilwell. Singer: Willard White. Singer: John Tomlinson. Orchestra: Academy of St Martin in the Fields. Conductor: Neville Marriner |
| 28 Apr 2024 | Edith Hall | Christoph Willibald Gluck | Orfeo ed Euridice; Che faro senza Euridice | Singer: Philippe Jaroussky. Ensemble: I Barocchisti. Director: Diego Fasolis. |
| 5 May 2024 | Percival Everett | Gustav Holst | The Planets Suite, Op. 32: I. Mars | Orchestra: London Philharmonic Orchestra. Conductor: Vladimir Jurowski. Holst: The Planets. London Philharmonic Orchestra. 101. |
| 5 May 2024 | Percival Everett | Charles Mingus | "Goodbye Pork Pie Hat" | Performer: Charles Mingus. Mingus Ah Um. Red Cab Records |
| 5 May 2024 | Percival Everett | Robert Johnson | "Kind Hearted Woman Blues" | Singer: Robert Johnson. The Centennial Collection. Columbia/Legacy. 1. |
| 5 May 2024 | Percival Everett | Antonín Dvořák | Symphony No. 9 in E minor "From the New World" (1st movement) | Orchestra: Chineke! Orchestra. Conductor: Kevin John Edusei. Dvořák: Symphony No. 9 From the New World / Sibelius: Finlandia. Signum Records. 2. |
| 5 May 2024 | Percival Everett | Lyle Lovett | "I Will Rise Up" / "Ain't No More Cane" | Ensemble: Lyle Lovett and His Large Band. It's Not Big It's Large. Humphead Records. 2. |
| 5 May 2024 | Percival Everett | Lorenzo Barcelata | "Maria Elena" | Performer: Ry Cooder. The Ry Cooder Anthology: The UFO Has Landed. Rhino/Warner Records. 16. |
| 5 May 2024 | Percival Everett | Richard Rodgers | "My Favorite Things" (Stereo) | Performer: John Coltrane. My Favorite Things (2022 Remaster). Rhino Atlantic. 5. |
| 5 May 2024 | Percival Everett | Arnold Schoenberg | Verklarte Nacht (conclusion) | Performer: Isabelle Faust. Performer: Anne Katharina Schreiber. Performer: Antoine Tamestit. Performer: Danusha Waskiewicz. Performer: Christian Poltéra. Performer: Jean‐Guihen Queyras. HARMONIA MUNDI. |
| 5 May 2024 | Percival Everett | Lightnin' Hopkins | "Mojo Hand" | Singer: Lightnin' Hopkins. Mojo Hand (Acapella). Cleopatra Records. 1. |
| 5 May 2024 | Percival Everett | Franz Schubert | 4 Impromptus for piano; No. 1 in C minor | Performer: Maria João Pires. DG. |
| 12 May 2024 | Alison Owen | Giacomo Puccini | "Sono andati?" (La Bohème) | Singer: Leontina Vaduva. Singer: Roberto Alagna. Choir: London Voices. Orchestra: Philharmonia Orchestra. Conductor: Sir Antonio Pappano. Puccini: La Bohème (Highlights). Warner Classics. 113. |
| 12 May 2024 | Alison Owen | Leonard Bernstein | "Maria" (West Side Story) | Lyricist: Stephen Sondheim. Singer: Jimmy Bryant. Orchestra: West Side Story Orchestra. Conductor: Jonny Green. Bernstein: West Side Story Original Soundtrack Recording. SONY. 1. |
| 12 May 2024 | Alison Owen | Maurice Ravel | "Pavane pour une infante défunte" | Performer: Bertrand Chamayou. Ravel: Complete Works for Solo Piano. Erato/Warner Classics. 2. |
| 12 May 2024 | Alison Owen | Cole Porter | "Let's Do It" | Lyricist: Cole Porter. Orchestra: Buddy Bregman. The Complete Original Song Books. Verve Reissues. 9. |
| 12 May 2024 | Alison Owen | Lily Allen | "Chinese" | It's Not Me It's You. Parlophone. 10. |
| 12 May 2024 | Alison Owen | Ludwig van Beethoven | Piano Concerto No. 2 in B♭ major, Op. 19 (2nd movement) | Performer: Paul Lewis. Orchestra: BBC Symphony Orchestra. Conductor: Jiří Bělohlávek. Beethoven Complete Piano Concertos Lewis – Belohlavek. Harmonia Mundi. 5. |
| 12 May 2024 | Alison Owen | John Coltrane | A Love Supreme, Part II – Resolution | A Love Supreme. GRP. 2. |
| 12 May 2024 | Alison Owen | Paul Cantelon | The Other Boleyn Girl: Opening Titles | Performer: Paul Cantelon. Orchestra: Czech Philharmonic. Conductor: James Shearman. The Other Boleyn Girl. Varese Sarabande. 1. |
| 12 May 2024 | Alison Owen | Gustav Holst | "In the Bleak Midwinter" | Choir: Choir of King’s College, Cambridge. Director: Stephen Cleobury |
| 12 May 2024 | Alison Owen | Amy Winehouse | "Love Is A Losing Game" | Singer: Amy Winehouse. Back To Black. Universal-Island Records Ltd.. 6. |
| 19 May 2024 | Harry Cliff | George Frideric Handel | Zadok the Priest | Choir: Choir of King’s College, Cambridge. Ensemble: Academy of Ancient Music. Conductor: Stephen Cleobury. Glorious Majesty. Warner Classics. 1. |
| 19 May 2024 | Harry Cliff | Nick Keir | "Far Down The Line" | Ensemble: The McCalmans. Greentrax. |
| 19 May 2024 | Harry Cliff | Richard Strauss | Also sprach Zarathustra (Prelude) | Orchestra: Philharmonia Orchestra. Conductor: Santtu-Matias Rouvali. Santtu Conducts Strauss. Signum Records. 24. |
| 19 May 2024 | Harry Cliff | Igor Stravinsky | The Rite of Spring (Part 1) | Orchestra: The Cleveland Orchestra. Conductor: Pierre Boulez. DG. |
| 19 May 2024 | Harry Cliff | Claude Debussy | "Clair de lune" (Suite bergamasque) | Performer: Jean‐Yves Thibaudet. Debussy: Images, Etudes etc. Decca. 3. |
| 19 May 2024 | Harry Cliff | William Byrd | "Ave Verum Corpus" | Ensemble: Sansara. Sansara's private recording of a rehearsal which they gave permission to use in. 1. |
| 19 May 2024 | Harry Cliff | Gustav Mahler | Symphony No. 2 in C minor "Resurrection" (conclusion) | Singer: Kate Royal. Singer: Magdalena Kožená. Choir: Berlin Radio Choir. Orchestra: Berliner Philharmoniker. Conductor: Sir Simon Rattle. Mahler: Symphony No. 2 "Resurrection". Warner Classics. 10. |
| 19 May 2024 | Harry Cliff | David Bowie | "Space Oddity" | Singer: David Bowie. ChangesOneBowie. Parlophone UK. 1. |
| 19 May 2024 | Harry Cliff | Johann Sebastian Bach | Cello Suite No. 1 in G major BWV.1007 (Prelude) | Performer: Yo‐Yo Ma. DECCA. |
| 26 May 2024 | Imtiaz Dharker | Antonín Dvořák | "Song to the Moon" (Rusalka) | Singer: Lucia Popp. Orchestra: Munich Radio Orchestra. Conductor: Stefan Soltész. |
| 26 May 2024 | Imtiaz Dharker | Mohammed Rafi | "Yeh Duniya Agar Mil Bhi Jaye To Kaye Hai?" | |
| 26 May 2024 | Imtiaz Dharker | Nikolai Rimsky-Korsakov | Scheherazade (The Story of the Kalendar Prince) | Conductor: Lorin Maazel. Orchestra: Berliner Philharmoniker. |
| 26 May 2024 | Imtiaz Dharker | Frédéric Chopin | Nocturne in E♭, Op. 9, No. 2 | Performer: Arthur Rubinstein. |
| 26 May 2024 | Imtiaz Dharker | Antonín Dvořák | Songs my mother taught me | Performer: Beatrice Harrison. |
| 26 May 2024 | Imtiaz Dharker | Olivier Messiaen | Quartet for the End of Time (1st movement) | Ensemble: Hebrides Ensemble. Conductor: William Conway. |
| 26 May 2024 | Imtiaz Dharker | Pejman Tadayon | Sufi Zikr | Performer: Pejman Tadayon. |
| 26 May 2024 | Imtiaz Dharker | Max Richter | Voices: Chorale – Part 4 | Singer: Grace Davidson. Choir: Tenebrae. Conductor: Robert Ziegler. |
| 26 May 2024 | Imtiaz Dharker | Billie Holiday & The Tony Scott Orchestra | "Strange Fruit", Tony Scott version | |
| 26 May 2024 | Imtiaz Dharker | Philip Glass | String Quartet No. 3 Mishima (6th movement) | Ensemble: Kronos Quartet. |
| 2 Jun 2024 | Dorothy Byrne | César Franck | Panis Angelicus | Singer: Beniamino Gigli. Conductor: Vito Carnevali. Ancient Arias & Sacred Songs. Urania. 14. |
| 2 Jun 2024 | Dorothy Byrne | Wolfgang Amadeus Mozart | Piano Concerto No. 20 in D minor K.466 (1st movement) | Performer: Mitsuko Uchida. Orchestra: The Cleveland Orchestra. Mozart: Piano Concertos 20, K466 & 27, K595; Mitsuko Uchida, The Cleveland Orche. Decca. 1. |
| 2 Jun 2024 | Dorothy Byrne | Edvard Grieg | "Anitra's Dance" (Peer Gynt Suite) | Performer: Anthony Goldstone. Performer: Caroline Clemmow. Divine Art Limited. |
| 2 Jun 2024 | Dorothy Byrne | Max Richter | Woolf Works: The Waves: Tuesday | Orchestra: Deutsches Filmorchester Babelsberg. Conductor: Robert Ziegler. Three Worlds: Music From Woolf Works. Deutsche Grammophon (DG). 16. |
| 2 Jun 2024 | Dorothy Byrne | Wolfgang Amadeus Mozart | Der Holle Rache (The Magic Flute) | Singer: Diana Damrau. Ensemble: Le Cercle de l'Harmonie. Conductor: Jérémie Rhorer. Mozart, Righini, Salieri: Arie di bravura. Warner Classics. 6. |
| 2 Jun 2024 | Dorothy Byrne | Ludwig van Beethoven | Piano Sonata in A♭, Op. 110 (1st movement) | Performer: Igor Levit. Beethoven: Complete Piano Sonatas. Sony Classical. 4. |
| 2 Jun 2024 | Dorothy Byrne | Amy Beach | Piano Concerto in C♯ minor, Op. 45 (4th movement) | Performer: Danny Driver. Orchestra: BBC Scottish Symphony Orchestra. Conductor: Rebecca Miller. Hyperion. |
| 2 Jun 2024 | Dorothy Byrne | Walter Donaldson | "Love Me or Leave Me" | Lyricist: Gus Kahn. Singer: Nina Simone. Les 50 plus belles chansons. Universal Music Division Decca Records France. 6. |
| 2 Jun 2024 | Dorothy Byrne | Hildegard von Bingen | O virtus Sapiente | Choir: Inter Alios Chamber Choir. Conductor: Rosie Dunn. |
| 2 Jun 2024 | Dorothy Byrne | George Frideric Handel | "Lascia ch'io pianga" (Rinaldo) | Singer: Sandrine Piau. Ensemble: Europa Galante. Conductor: Fabio Biondi. Handel: Arie e Duetti D'Amore; Europa Galante. Naive. 3. |
| 9 Jun 2024 | Brian Cox (physicist) | Richard Strauss | R. Strauss: Also sprach Zarathustra, Op. 30 – II. Von den Hinterweltlern | Conductor: Herbert von Karajan. Orchestra: Berliner Philharmoniker. R. Strauss: Zarathustra; Till; Don Juan; Heldenleben; Tod & Verklärung. Deutsche Grammophon (DG). 2. |
| 9 Jun 2024 | Brian Cox (physicist) | Gordon MacRae, Shirley Jones & Jay Blackton and His Orchestra | "People Will Say We're in Love" | Oklahoma Original Motion Picture Soundtrack, Expanded Edition. Angel Records. 10. |
| 9 Jun 2024 | Brian Cox (physicist) | Hans Zimmer | "Murph" (from Interstellar) | Conductor: Hans Zimmer. Interstellar (Original Motion Picture Soundtrack) [Expanded Edition]. WaterTower Music. 25. |
| 9 Jun 2024 | Brian Cox (physicist) | Gustav Mahler | Symphony No. 2 "Resurrection" (conclusion) | Singer: Barbara Hendricks. Singer: Christa Ludwig. Choir: Westminster Choir. Orchestra: New York Philharmonic. Conductor: Leonard Bernstein. Mahler: Symphony No. 2 "Resurrection". Deutsche Grammophon (DG). 15. |
| 9 Jun 2024 | Brian Cox (physicist) | Charles Ives | The Unanswered Question (Two Contemplations) | Orchestra: Orchestra of St. Luke’s. Conductor: John Adams. John Adams: American Elegies. Elektra Nonesuch. 1. |
| 9 Jun 2024 | Brian Cox (physicist) | Richard Strauss | Also sprach Zarathustra, Op. 30 – VIII. Das Tanzlied – Das Nachtlied | Orchestra: Berliner Philharmoniker. Conductor: Herbert von Karajan. R. Strauss: Zarathustra; Till; Don Juan; Heldenleben; Tod & Verklärung. Deutsche Grammophon (DG). 8. |
| 9 Jun 2024 | Brian Cox (physicist) | Harold Arlen | "Over the Rainbow" | Music arranger: Keith Jarrett. Performer: Keith Jarrett. La Scala (Live). ECM Records. 3. |
| 9 Jun 2024 | Brian Cox (physicist) | Jean Sibelius | Berliner Philharmoniker etal – Allegro molto – Misterioso – Largamente assai | Orchestra: Berliner Philharmoniker. Conductor: Sir Simon Rattle. Sibelius Symphonies 1–7. Berliner Philharmoniker Recordings. 3. |
| 9 Jun 2024 | Brian Cox (physicist) | Gustav Mahler | Symphony No. 10 (1st movement) | Music arranger: Deryck Cooke. Orchestra: Vienna Philharmonic. Conductor: Daniel Harding. Mahler: Symphony No.10. Deutsche Grammophon (DG). 1. |
| 16 Jun 2024 | Frank Gardner | Robert Schumann | Reconnaissance (Carnaval, Op. 9) | Performer: Sir Stephen Hough. In the Night. HYPERION. 21. |
| 16 Jun 2024 | Frank Gardner | Neil Gardner | Concert for Oboe and Strings Op. 13, 2. Alla marcia | Performer: Andrew Knight. Ensemble: Royal Philharmonic Orchestra members. SPMS Press. |
| 16 Jun 2024 | Frank Gardner | Charles‐Marie Widor | Toccata (Symphony No. 5 in F minor) | Performer: Wayne Marshall. The Virtuoso Organist: Wayne Marshall. EMI. 14. |
| 16 Jun 2024 | Frank Gardner | Vittorio Monti | Csardas | Performer: Sándor Lakatos. Ensemble: Sandor Lakatos Ensemble. Paganini's Devil's Violin |
| 16 Jun 2024 | Frank Gardner | Gregorio Allegri | Miserere | Choir: Tallis Scholars. Director: Peter Phillips. The Tallis Scholars Live in Rome. Gimell. 8. |
| 16 Jun 2024 | Frank Gardner | Ralph Vaughan Williams | The Lark Ascending | Performer: Nicola Benedetti. Orchestra: London Philharmonic Orchestra. Conductor: Andrew Litton. Fantasie. Deutsche Grammophon. 2. |
| 16 Jun 2024 | Frank Gardner | Émile Waldteufel | "Les Patineurs" [The skaters] – Waltz Op. 183 | Orchestra: Vienna Philharmonic. Conductor: Gustavo Dudamel. SONY CLASSICAL. |
| 16 Jun 2024 | Frank Gardner | Claude Debussy | "Clair de lune" (Suite bergamasque) | Performer: Jean-Efflam Bavouzet. Debussy: Complete Works for Piano. CHANDOS. 4. |
| 16 Jun 2024 | Frank Gardner | Dmitri Shostakovich | Suite No. 2 for Jazz Band: Waltz 2 | Orchestra: Royal Concertgebouw Orchestra. Conductor: Riccardo Chailly. Shostakovich: The Jazz Album – Brautigam, Masseurs. Decca. 13. |
| 16 Jun 2024 | Frank Gardner | Fats Waller | "Ain't Misbehavin'" | Composer: Harry Brooks. Composer: Andy Razaf. Performer: Fats Waller. Orchestra: Zutty Singleton & His Orchestra. Stormy Weather (The Soundtrack Factory). The Soundtrack Factory. 8. |
| 23 Jun 2024 | Olivia Laing | Johann Sebastian Bach | Concerto for 2 Violins in D minor, BWV 1043 (2nd movement) | Performer: Yehudi Menuhin. Performer: Christian Ferras. Orchestra: Bath Festival Orchestra. Conductor: Yehudi Menuhin. Bach: Brandenburg Concertos, BWV 1046–1051 & Violin Concertos, BWV 1042–1043. Warner Classics. 208. |
| 23 Jun 2024 | Olivia Laing | Giacomo Puccini | "Vissi d'arte" (Tosca) | Singer: Maria Callas. Orchestra: National Theater Opera Orchestra of Paris. Conductor: Georges Sébastian. Live in Paris 1958. Warner Classics. 15. |
| 23 Jun 2024 | Olivia Laing | Richard Wagner | "Mild und leise wie er lächelt" (Tristan und Isolde) | Singer: Birgit Nilsson. Orchestra: Bayreuth Festival Orchestra. Conductor: Karl Bohm. Wagner: Tristan und Isolde. Deutsche Grammophon (DG). 29. |
| 23 Jun 2024 | Olivia Laing | Pet Shop Boys | "Being Boring" | Ultimate. Parlophone UK. 9. |
| 23 Jun 2024 | Olivia Laing | Henry Purcell | "The Cold Song" | Singer: Klaus Nomi. Klaus Nomi. RCA. 1. |
| 23 Jun 2024 | Olivia Laing | William Basinski | Disintegration Loops (1.1 Excerpt I) | Music from The Comedy – A film by Rick Alverson. Jagjaguwar. 7. |
| 23 Jun 2024 | Olivia Laing | Exuma | 22nd Century | Music arranger: Harold Wheeler. Music arranger: Nina Simone. Singer: Nina Simone. Conductor: Harold Wheeler. Here Comes The Sun (Expanded Edition). RCA/Legacy. 13. |
| 23 Jun 2024 | Olivia Laing | George Frideric Handel | "Ombra mai fu" (Serse) | Singer: Lorraine Hunt Lieberson. Orchestra: Orchestra of the Age of Enlightenment. Conductor: Harry Bicket. Handel Arias. AVIE Records. 20. |
| 23 Jun 2024 | Olivia Laing | Henry Purcell | "When I am laid in earth" (Dido and Aeneas) | Singer: Janet Baker. Orchestra: English Chamber Orchestra. Conductor: Anthony Lewis. DECCA. |
| 30 Jun 2024 | Hugh Fearnley-Whittingstall | Giuseppe Verdi | Brindisi (La Traviata) | Singer: Angela Gheorghiu. Singer: Roberto Alagna. Choir: London Voices. Orchestra: Berliner Philharmoniker. Conductor: Claudio Abbado. Verdi per due. EMI CLASSICS. 19. |
| 30 Jun 2024 | Hugh Fearnley-Whittingstall | Ludwig van Beethoven | Symphony No. 6 in F "Pastoral" (1st movement) | Orchestra: Danish National Chamber Orchestra. Conductor: Ádám Fischer. Beethoven: Complete Symphonies. Naxos. 301. |
| 30 Jun 2024 | Hugh Fearnley-Whittingstall | Van Morrison | "Connswater" | Singer: Van Morrison. Inarticulate Speech of the Heart. Legacy Recordings. 2. |
| 30 Jun 2024 | Hugh Fearnley-Whittingstall | Gioachino Rossini | The Barber of Seville (Overture) | Orchestra: Royal Philharmonic Orchestra. Conductor: Enrique Bátiz. Orchestral Lollipops: Royal Philharmonic Orchestra/Enrique Batiz. RPO. 1. |
| 30 Jun 2024 | Hugh Fearnley-Whittingstall | John Barry | "Joe Buck Rides Again" (Midnight Cowboy) | Conductor: John Barry. Midnight Cowboy (Music from the Motion Picture). EMI/EMI Records (USA). 2. |
| 30 Jun 2024 | Hugh Fearnley-Whittingstall | Franz Schubert | Piano Sonata No. 18 in G major, D. 894 (3rd movement) | Performer: Alfred Brendel. Schubert: Piano Sonatas Nos. 17 & 18. Decca Music Group Ltd. 7. |
| 30 Jun 2024 | Hugh Fearnley-Whittingstall | Amjad Ali Khan, Amaan Ali Khan, Ayaan Ali Khan & Satyajit Talwalkar | "Raga for Peace" | 2014 Nobel Peace Prize Concert. 1. |
| 30 Jun 2024 | Hugh Fearnley-Whittingstall | Ludwig van Beethoven | Turkish March (The Ruins of Athens) | Orchestra: Berliner Philharmoniker. Conductor: Claudio Abbado. DG. |
| 7 Jul 2024 | Richard Thompson | Manuel de Falla | Spanish Dance No. 1 (La Vida Breve) | Performer: Alexandre Lagoya. Performer: Ida Presti. Music arranger: Alexandre Lagoya. Ida Presti & Alexandre Lagoya Edition – Complete Philips recordings. Universal Music Division Decca Records France. 6. |
| 7 Jul 2024 | Richard Thompson | Duke Ellington | "Caravan" | Composer: Irving Mills. Composer: Juan Tizol. Performer: Les Paul. The New Sound. Capitol Records. 4. |
| 7 Jul 2024 | Richard Thompson | Edward Elgar | "Where corals lie" (Sea Pictures, Op. 37) | Singer: Janet Baker. Orchestra: London Symphony Orchestra. Conductor: John Barbirolli. Elgar: Cello Concerto/Sea Pictures: Du Pre/Baker/LSO/Barbirolli. EMI. 8. |
| 7 Jul 2024 | Richard Thompson | Trad. | "Brave Wolfe" | Ensemble: The Watersons. Early Days. Topic. 9. |
| 7 Jul 2024 | Richard Thompson | Claude Debussy | Jeux | Orchestra: Hallé. Conductor: Sir Mark Elder. Debussy: Jeux, Preludes – Matthews: Postlude. Halle Concerts Society. 1. |
| 7 Jul 2024 | Richard Thompson | Benjamin Britten | Four Sea Interludes from Peter Grimes (Dawn) | Orchestra: Bergen Philharmonic Orchestra. Conductor: Neeme Järvi. Britten: Young Persons Guide to the Orchestra: Bergen P.O., Neeme Jarvi. BIS. 6. |
| 7 Jul 2024 | Richard Thompson | Dmitri Shostakovich | Two Pieces for String Octet, Op. 11: I. Prelude | Ensemble: Potsdam Chamber Academy. Schostakowitsch: Kammersinfonien. Sony Classical. 10. |
| 7 Jul 2024 | Richard Thompson | Dmitri Shostakovich | Two Pieces for String Octet, Op. 11: II. Scherzo | Ensemble: Potsdam Chamber Academy. Schostakowitsch: Kammersinfonien. Sony Classical. 11. |
| 7 Jul 2024 | Richard Thompson | Alfredo Catalani | "Ebben? Ne andro lontano" (La Wally) | Singer: Maria Callas. Orchestra: Philharmonic Orchestra. Conductor: Tullio Serafin. Maria Callas: The Voice of the Century. EMI. 12. |
| 7 Jul 2024 | Richard Thompson | Henry Purcell | Dido & Aeneas: Overture | Orchestra: Academy of Ancient Music. Conductor: Christopher Hogwood. OISEAU LYRE. |
| 7 Jul 2024 | Richard Thompson | Richard Thompson | "Freeze" | Ship to Shore. New West Records. 1. |
| 7 Jul 2024 | Richard Thompson | Ludwig van Beethoven | String Quartet in F major, Op. 135 (3rd movement) | Ensemble: Hagen Quartett. 111 Years Of Deutsche Grammophon The Collector's Edition Vol.2. Deutsche Grammophon. 3. |
| 14 Jul 2024 | Clio Barnard | Johann Sebastian Bach | Mass in B minor (Dona nobis pacem) | Choir: Amsterdam Baroque Choir. Orchestra: Amsterdam Baroque Orchestra. Conductor: Ton Koopman. Warner Classics |
| 14 Jul 2024 | Clio Barnard | Träd | Where Did You Sleep Last Night | Singer: Lead Belly. Jazz Figures / Leadbelly (1934–1940). Collector Records Greece. 21. |
| 14 Jul 2024 | Clio Barnard | Fumio Hayasaka | Film Suite from Rashomon 4 | Conductor: Fumio Hayasaka. The Seventh Samurai Rashomon Original Motion Picture Soundtrack. Varese Sarabande. 2. |
| 14 Jul 2024 | Clio Barnard | Mike Westbrook, Phil Minton & London College of Music Chamber Choir | I See Thy Form | Glad Day Live. Westbrook Records. 1. |
| 14 Jul 2024 | Clio Barnard | Philip Glass | The Thin Blue Line (Prologue) | Conductor: Michael Riesman. The Thin Blue Line (Original Soundtrack). Nonesuch. 2. |
| 14 Jul 2024 | Clio Barnard | Hildur Guðnadóttir | Opaque | Performer: Hildur Guðnadóttir. Performer: Skúli Sverrisson. Without Sinking. Deutsche Grammophon (DG). 6. |
| 14 Jul 2024 | Clio Barnard | Leonard Bernstein | "Gee, officer Krupke" (West Side Story) | Performer: Russ Tamblyn. Lyricist: Stephen Sondheim. Ensemble: West Side Story Ensemble (Original Motion Picture Soundtrack). Conductor: Johnny Green. West Side Story (Original Motion Picture Soundtrack). Masterworks Broadway. 9. |
| 14 Jul 2024 | Clio Barnard | Heinrich Ignaz Franz von Biber | Passacaglia for unaccompanied violin | Performer: Rachel Podger. ~Guardian Angel. CHANNEL Classics. 20. |
| 14 Jul 2024 | Clio Barnard | Träd | Katie Cruel | Music arranger: Karen Dalton. Singer: Karen Dalton. In My Own Time (50th Anniversary Deluxe Edition). Light In The Attic Records. 4. |
| 14 Jul 2024 | Clio Barnard | Curlew Song recorded by Merlin Driver | Bubbling Song (April) :Geltsdale and Hadrian's Wall | Simmerdim: Curlew Sounds. The Curlew Sounds Project. 1. |
| 14 Jul 2024 | Clio Barnard | Sam Lee | McCrimmon | Composer: James Keay. Composer: Misha Mullov-Abbado. Composer: Josh Green. Singer: Sam Lee. songdreaming. Cooking Vinyl Limited. 3. |
| 14 Jul 2024 | Clio Barnard | Alice Coltrane | Journey In Satchidananda | Performer: Pharoah Sanders. Performer: Alice Coltrane. Journey in Satchidananda. Impulse! Records. 1. |
| 25 Aug 2024 | Thomas Adès | Franz Schubert | Octet (Finale) | Ensemble: Wiener Oktett. Schubert: Octet, D. 803; Minuet and Finale for Wind Octet, D. 72 (New Vienna Oct. Universal Music Australia Pty. Ltd. 6. |
| 25 Aug 2024 | Thomas Adès | Frédéric Chopin | Polonaise in A♭, Op. 53 | Performer: Anthony Goldstone. 12 Great Masterworks. Prestige Classics. 7. |
| 25 Aug 2024 | Thomas Adès | Igor Stravinsky | Les Noces (Part 1) | Ensemble: Pokrovsky Ensemble. Stravinksy: Les Noces ("The Wedding") and Russian Village Wedding Songs. Nonesuch. 4. |
| 25 Aug 2024 | Thomas Adès | Leoš Janáček | The Makropulos Case (Prelude) | Lyricist: Karel Čapek. Orchestra: Vienna Philharmonic. Conductor: Charles Mackerras. Janacek: Vec Makropulos / Lachian Dances. Decca Music Group Ltd. 1. |
| 25 Aug 2024 | Thomas Adès | Ferruccio Busoni | Concerto for Piano, Op. 39.II | Performer: John Ogdon. Busoni: Piano Concerto. Warner Classics. 0094637246757. 2. |
| 25 Aug 2024 | Thomas Adès | György Kurtág | "You took my heart" (Messages of the Late R.V. Troussova), Op. 17 | Performer: Márta Fábián. Singer: Adrienne Csengery. Hungaroton. |
| 25 Aug 2024 | Thomas Adès | Alban Berg | Lulu (conclusion) | Singer: Teresa Stratas. Singer: Yvonne Minton. Singer: Franz Mazura. Orchestra: National Theater Opera Orchestra of Paris. Conductor: Pierre Boulez. Berg: Lulu. Deutsche Grammophon (DG). 36. |
| 25 Aug 2024 | Thomas Adès | Harrison Birtwistle | Silbury Air | Orchestra: London Sinfonietta. Conductor: Elgar Howarth. NMC. |
| 15 Sep 2024 | Ann Cleeves | Unknown | Hen Wlad Fy Nhadau (Welsh National Anthem) | Composer: Träd. Choir: Rhos Male Voice Choir. Music & Carols from the Welsh Mines. Moochin About. 1. |
| 15 Sep 2024 | Ann Cleeves | Benjamin Britten | 4 Sea interludes [from Peter Grimes] Op. 33a [concert version]: 1: Dawn | Orchestra: Bournemouth Symphony Orchestra. Conductor: Richard Hickox. CHANDOS. |
| 15 Sep 2024 | Ann Cleeves | Ludwig van Beethoven | Symphony No. 6 in F major "Pastoral" (5th movement) | Orchestra: Malmö SymfoniOrkester. Conductor: Robert Treviño. Beethoven: Symphonies Nos. 1-9 (Live). Ondine. 305. |
| 15 Sep 2024 | Ann Cleeves | Traditional Shetland | "Da Day Dawn"/"Greenland Man's Tune" | Performer: Chris Stout. Performer: Catriona McKay. First o' the Darkenin'. GREENTRAX. 1. |
| 15 Sep 2024 | Ann Cleeves | Ralph Vaughan Williams | "The Lark Ascending" | Performer: Sarah Chang. Orchestra: London Philharmonic Orchestra. Conductor: Bernard Haitink |
| 15 Sep 2024 | Ann Cleeves | Patrick Doyle | "Non Nobis Domine" (Henry V) | Singer: Patrick Doyle. Choir: Stephen Hill Singers. Orchestra: City of Birmingham Symphony Orchestra. Conductor: Sir Simon Rattle. Henry V Original Soundtrack Recording. EMI. 12. |
| 15 Sep 2024 | Ann Cleeves | Edward Elgar | Cello concerto in E minor, Op. 85 | Performer: Jacqueline du Pré. Orchestra: London Symphony Orchestra. Conductor: John Barbirolli. British Composers: Sir John Barbirolli conducts Elgar. Warner Classics. 506. |
| 15 Sep 2024 | Ann Cleeves | Antonio Vivaldi | "Vieni, Vieni o mio Diletto" | Performer: Miguel Zanetti. Singer: Montserrat Caballé. Les Maitres Italiens de L'Art Lyrique Vol. 1: L'Art De Montserrat Caballe. Forlane. 3. |
| 15 Sep 2024 | Ann Cleeves | Peter Maxwell Davies | Farewell to Stromness (The Yellow Cake Revue) | Performer: Peter Maxwell Davies. Peter Maxwell Davies: A Celebration of Scotland: Scottish Chamber Orchestre & Choir. Unicorn-Kanchana. |
| 22 Sep 2024 | Jay Rayner | Michel Petrucciani | "Cantabile" | Trio in Tokyo (Live) [Bonus Track Version]. Dreyfus Jazz. 6. |
| 22 Sep 2024 | Jay Rayner | Jule Styne | Gypsy (Overture) | Orchestra: Gypsy Orchestra. Conductor: Milton Rosenstock. Gypsy (50th Anniversary Edition / Original Broadway Cast Recording). Masterworks Broadway. 1. |
| 22 Sep 2024 | Jay Rayner | Nikolai Rimsky-Korsakov | "The Sea and Sinbad's Ship" (Scheherazade) | Performer: Lawrence Rock. Orchestra: New York Philharmonic. Conductor: Alan Gilbert. Rimsky-Korsakov: Scheherazade. New York Philharmonic. 1. |
| 22 Sep 2024 | Jay Rayner | Madeleine Dring | Blue Air (Colour Suite) | Performer: Leigh Kaplan. Leigh Kaplan Plays Madeline Dring. Cambria. 1. |
| 22 Sep 2024 | Jay Rayner | Władysław Szpilman | Concertino | Performer: Władysław Szpilman. Orchestra: Polish Radio Orchestra. Conductor: Stefan Rachoń. The Original Recordings of the Pianist. Sony Classical/Sony Music. 4. |
| 22 Sep 2024 | Jay Rayner | Tommy Wolf | "Spring Can Really Hang You Up the Most" | Ensemble: Bill Charlap Trio. Uptown, Downtown. Universal Music Division Decca Records France. 2. |
| 22 Sep 2024 | Jay Rayner | Ariel Ramírez | "Misa Criolla" (Kyrie) | Performer: Ariel Ramírez. Ensemble: Los Fronterizos. Conductor: Jesus Gabriel Segade. Misa Criolla. Universal Music S.A. 1. |
| 22 Sep 2024 | Jay Rayner | Sophie Solomon | "Holy Devil" | Composer: Jonathan Quarmby. Performer: Sophie Solomon. Poison Sweet Madeira. Decca Music Group Ltd. 1. |
| 22 Sep 2024 | Jay Rayner | Akil "Fresh" King | "Worth It" | Composer: John Hill. Composer: Mike Sabath. Composer: Rachel Keen. Singer: RAYE. Conductor: Tom Richards. Ensemble: Heritage Orchestra. Choir: Flames Collective Choir. My 21st Century Symphony (Live at the Royal Albert Hall). Human Re Sources. 15. |
| 29 Sep 2024 | Lucian Msamati | Erik Satie | Gymnopédie No. 1 in D major | Performer: Joanna MacGregor. The Music of Erik Satie; Joanna MacGregor. Collins Classics. 6. |
| 29 Sep 2024 | Lucian Msamati | Pyotr Ilyich Tchaikovsky | Piano Concerto No. 1 in B♭ minor (1st movement) | Performer: Evgeny Kissin. Orchestra: Berliner Philharmoniker. Conductor: Herbert von Karajan. Tchaikovsky: Piano Concerto No. 1. Deutsche Grammophon (DG). 1. |
| 29 Sep 2024 | Lucian Msamati | Jean Sibelius | Symphony No. 7 in C major, Op. 105 (1st movement) | Orchestra: BBC Philharmonic Orchestra. Conductor: John Storgårds. Sibelius: Complete Symphonies/Three Late Fragments. CHANDOS. 8. |
| 29 Sep 2024 | Lucian Msamati | Gabriel Yared | "The Cave of Swimmers" (The English Patient) | Orchestra: Academy of St Martin in the Fields. Conductor: Harry Rabinowitz. Original Soundtrack Recording, Fantasy |
| 29 Sep 2024 | Lucian Msamati | Franz Schubert | "Ave Maria" | Music arranger: S. Wonder. Singer: Stevie Wonder. Someday At Christmas (Expanded Edition). UNI/MOTOWN. 3. |
| 29 Sep 2024 | Lucian Msamati | Wolfgang Amadeus Mozart | Serenade for 13 Wind Instruments in B♭ major, K. 361 (3rd movement, Adagio) | Orchestra: Orpheus Chamber Orchestra |
| 29 Sep 2024 | Lucian Msamati | Frédéric Chopin | Piano Sonata No. 2 in B♭ minor (2nd movement) | Performer: Leif Ove Andsnes. Musiques pour un adieu. Parlophone France. 12. |
| 29 Sep 2024 | Lucian Msamati | Benjamin Clementine | St-Clementine-On-Tea-And-Croissants | Singer: Benjamin Clementine. At Least For Now (Deluxe). Universal Music Division Barclay. 5. |
| 6 Oct 2024 | Jenny Beavan | Johann Sebastian Bach | Mein teurer Heil (St John Passion) | Singer: Sebastian Noack. Ensemble: Collegium Vocale Gent. Conductor: Philippe Herreweghe. Harmonia Mundi. |
| 6 Oct 2024 | Jenny Beavan | Benjamin Britten | "The Storm" (Peter Grimes) | Orchestra: Orchestra of Royal Opera House, Covent Garden. Conductor: Benjamin Britten. Britten: The Young Person's Guide to the Orchestra; Four Sea Interludes etc. Decca Music Group Ltd. 5. |
| 6 Oct 2024 | Jenny Beavan | Franz Schubert | Erlkönig D.328 | Singer: Dietrich Fischer‐Dieskau. Performer: Gerald Moore. Deutsche Grammophon. |
| 6 Oct 2024 | Jenny Beavan | Stephen Sondheim | "Losing My Mind" (Follies) | Singer: Imelda Staunton. Orchestra: Sylvia Addison. Conductor: Nigel Lilley. Follies (2018 National Theatre Cast Recording). Arts Music. 17. |
| 6 Oct 2024 | Jenny Beavan | Edward Elgar | Cello Concerto in E minor, Op. 85 (4th movement) | Performer: Sheku Kanneh‐Mason. Orchestra: London Symphony Orchestra. Conductor: Sir Simon Rattle. Elgar. DECCA. 6. |
| 6 Oct 2024 | Jenny Beavan | George Frideric Handel | "Eternal source of light divine" (Ode for the Birthday of Queen Anne) | Performer: Alison Balsom. Singer: Iestyn Davies. Orchestra: The English Concert. Conductor: Trevor Pinnock. Sound the Trumpet (Royal Music of Purcell and Handel). EMI Classics. 10. |
| 6 Oct 2024 | Jenny Beavan | Ludwig van Beethoven | Symphony No. 7 in A major, Op. 92 (2nd movement) | Orchestra: Berliner Philharmoniker. Conductor: Kirill Petrenko. Beethoven · Tchaikovsky · Schmidt · Stephan. Berlin Philharmonic Orchestra. 102. |
| 6 Oct 2024 | Jenny Beavan | Träd | "He Moved Through the Fair" | Singer: Sinéad O’Connor. Gospel Oak. Chrysalis Records. 6. |
| 6 Oct 2024 | Jenny Beavan | Felix Mendelssohn | Octet in E♭ major, Op. 20 (3rd movement) | Ensemble: Nash Ensemble. Beethoven/Mendelssohn: Nash Ensemble. Wigmore Hall Live. 6. |
| 6 Oct 2024 | Jenny Beavan | George Harrison | "Within You Without You" | Ensemble: The Beatles. Sgt. Pepper's Lonely Hearts Club Band (Super Deluxe Edition). UMC (Universal Music Catalogue). 8. |
| 13 Oct 2024 | Sarah Ogilvie | Claudio Monteverdi | "Beatus vir" | Choir: Choir of New College Oxford. Orchestra: Capricorn. Conductor: Edward Higginbottom. Agnus Dei Volumes 1 & 2. Warner Classics International. 10. |
| 13 Oct 2024 | Sarah Ogilvie | Billy Taylor | "I Wish I Knew How It Would Feel to Be Free" | Lyricist: Dick Dallas. Singer: Nina Simone. I Wish I Knew How It Would Feel to Be Free (Live – Montreux Jazz Festival 1976). BMG Rights Management (UK) Ltd. 1. |
| 13 Oct 2024 | Sarah Ogilvie | Wolfgang Amadeus Mozart | Piano Sonata No. 18 in D major, K 576 (2nd movement) | Performer: Mitsuko Uchida. Mozart: Complete Piano Sonatas: Mitsuko Uchida. Philips. 8. |
| 13 Oct 2024 | Sarah Ogilvie | Hugo Peretti | "Can't Help Falling in Love" | Composer: Luigi Creatore. Composer: George David Weiss. Singer: Elvis Presley. Blue Suede Shoes. Black Sheep Music. 16. |
| 13 Oct 2024 | Sarah Ogilvie | Martin Bresnick | "My Twentieth Century" | Ensemble: Povera Players. Martin Bresnick: My Twentieth Century. New World Records. 11. |
| 13 Oct 2024 | Sarah Ogilvie | Gregorio Allegri | "Miserere mei, Deus" | Ensemble: The Cardinall’s Musick. Conductor: Andrew Carwood. Hyperion. 0034571178608. 15. |
| 13 Oct 2024 | Sarah Ogilvie | composer_not_informed | Sounds to study to | Recording of the Weston Library, one of The Bodleian Libraries, University of Oxford University of Oxford YouTube Channel. 1. |
| 13 Oct 2024 | Sarah Ogilvie | Jane Siberry | "Love Is Everything" | Singer: k.d. lang. Hymns of the 49th Parallel. Nonesuch. 11. |
| 13 Oct 2024 | Sarah Ogilvie | James Whitbourn | "Lighten Our Darknes"s | Choir: The Choir of Harris Manchester College, Oxford. Conductor: Stephen Taylor. |
| 20 Oct 2024 | Garth Greenwell | John Taverner | Mass "The Western Wind" | Choir: Yale Schola Cantorum. Conductor: Simon Carrington. Sing, Ye Birds, a Joyous SongDelos. 1. |
| 20 Oct 2024 | Garth Greenwell | Benjamin Britten | The Turn of the Screw (Prologue) | Singer: Peter Pears. Orchestra: English Opera Group. Conductor: Benjamin Britten. Britten: The Turn of the Screw. Decca Music Group Ltd. 1. |
| 20 Oct 2024 | Garth Greenwell | Benjamin Britten | "The Journey" (The Turn of the Screw) | Singer: Jennifer Vyvyan. Orchestra: English Opera Group. Conductor: Benjamin Britten. Britten: The Turn of the Screw. Decca Music Group Ltd. 2. |
| 20 Oct 2024 | Garth Greenwell | Ludwig van Beethoven | Piano Sonata No. 32 in C minor, Op. 111 – 2. Arietta. | Performer: Alfred Brendel. Decca Music Group Ltd. |
| 20 Oct 2024 | Garth Greenwell | Richard Strauss | September (4 Last Songs) | Singer: Jessye Norman. Orchestra: Leipzig Gewandhaus Orchestra. Conductor: Kurt Masur. PHILIPS. |
| 20 Oct 2024 | Garth Greenwell | David T. Little | What Belongs to You opera: Earthquake | Ensemble: Alarm Will Sound. Singer: Karim Sulayman. What belongs to you rehearsal recording. 1. |
| 20 Oct 2024 | Garth Greenwell | Julius Eastman | The Zurich Concert (Extract) | The Zurich Concert. New World Records. 1. |
| 20 Oct 2024 | Garth Greenwell | Gustav Mahler | Rückert Lieder: No. 4, 'Ich bin der Welt abhanden gekommen' | Singer: Kathleen Ferrier. Orchestra: Vienna Philharmonic. Conductor: Bruno Walter. DECCA. |
| 20 Oct 2024 | Garth Greenwell | Benjamin Britten | Canticle I "My beloved is mine" | Performer: Graham Johnson. Singer: Anthony Rolfe Johnson. Britten: Canticle 1/Michelangelo sonnets etc: Johnson/Johnson. Hyperion. 8. |
| 3 Nov 2024 | Bryan Ferry | Giovanni Battista Pergolesi | Stabat Mater | Singer: Emma Kirkby. Singer: James Bowman. Conductor: Christopher Hogwood. Orchestra: Academy of Ancient Music. Pergolesi: Stabat Mater. Decca Music Group Ltd. 1. |
| 3 Nov 2024 | Bryan Ferry | Arthur Schwartz | Dancing In The Dark | Orchestra: MGM Studio Orchestra. The Band Wagon – OST. Snapper Music |
| 3 Nov 2024 | Bryan Ferry | John Klenner | "Just Friends" | Performer: Charlie Parker. Conductor: Jimmy Carroll. Charlie Parker with Strings – April in Paris: The Genius Of Charlie Parker #2. Verve Reissues. |
| 3 Nov 2024 | Bryan Ferry | Richard Strauss | "Fruhling" (4 Last Songs) | Singer: Elisabeth Schwarzkopf. Orchestra: German Symphony Orchestra Berlin. Conductor: George Szell. Warner Classics. |
| 3 Nov 2024 | Bryan Ferry | Sergey Prokofiev | Romeo and Juliet, Op. 64, Act 1, Scene 2: Dance of the Knights | Conductor: André Previn. Orchestra: London Symphony Orchestra. Prokofiev: Romeo and Juliet. Warner Classics. 113. |
| 3 Nov 2024 | Bryan Ferry | Guy Wood | "My One And Only Love" | Composer: Robert Mellin. Performer: John Coltrane. Singer: Johnny Hartman. A John Coltrane Retrospective: The Impulse Years. Verve Reissues. 6. |
| 3 Nov 2024 | Bryan Ferry | Edward Elgar | Cello Concerto in E minor (1st movement) | Performer: Jacqueline du Pré. Orchestra: London Symphony Orchestra. Conductor: John Barbirolli. EMI. |
| 3 Nov 2024 | Bryan Ferry | Ken Colyer | "Goin' Home" | Ensemble: Ken Colyer's Jazzmen. Ken Colyer's Jazzmen and Skiffle Group. Documents. 1. |
| 3 Nov 2024 | Bryan Ferry | Kurt Weill | "September Song" (from Knickerbocker Holiday) | Singer: Walter Huston. Music Today Records |
| 3 Nov 2024 | Bryan Ferry | Gustav Mahler | "Nun will die Sonn" (Kindertotenlieder) | Lyricist: Friedrich Rückert. Singer: Janet Baker. Orchestra: Hallé. Conductor: John Barbirolli. Icon: Dame Janet Baker. EMI Classics. 3. |
| 10 Nov 2024 | Dame Maggie Aderin-Pocock | Claude Debussy | "de lune" (Suite bergamasque) | Performer: Pascal Rogé. Fur Elise, Piano Music by Beethoven, Chopin, etc.: Ashkenezy, etc. Decca. 12. |
| 10 Nov 2024 | Dame Maggie Aderin-Pocock | Johann Sebastian Bach | St John Passion Pt 2: Da fuhreten sie Jesum von Caiaphas (Recitative + Chorus) | Performer: Bach Collegium Japan Chorus. Singer: James Gilchrist. Singer: Christian Immler. Conductor: Masaaki Suzuki. Singer: Yusuke Watanabe. Orchestra: Bach Collegium Japan. JS Bach: St John Passion Bacxh Collegium Japan. BIS. 2. |
| 10 Nov 2024 | Dame Maggie Aderin-Pocock | Antonín Dvořák | Symphony No. 9 in E minor, Op. 95 "From the New World" (2nd movement) | Orchestra: Chineke! Orchestra. Conductor: Kevin John Edusei. Signum Classics |
| 10 Nov 2024 | Dame Maggie Aderin-Pocock | Henry Purcell | "When I am Laid in Earth" (from Dido & Aeneas) | Music arranger: William Orbit. Music arranger: Rico Conning. Singer: Andreas Scholl. Pieces In A Modern Style Vol. 2 Digital exclusive with bonus track. Decca Music Group Ltd. 15. |
| 10 Nov 2024 | Dame Maggie Aderin-Pocock | Gustav Holst | The Planets, Op. 32; Neptune, the Mystic | Orchestra: BBC Symphony Orchestra. Choir: BBC Symphony Chorus. Conductor: Andrew Davis. TELDEC |
| 10 Nov 2024 | Dame Maggie Aderin-Pocock | Modest Mussorgsky | Pictures at an Exhibition: Bydlo "The Ox Cart" | Orchestra: Berliner Philharmoniker. Conductor: Claudio Abbado. Pictures at an Exhibition, A Night on Bald Mountain. DG. 12. |
| 10 Nov 2024 | Dame Maggie Aderin-Pocock | George Gershwin | An American in Paris – piano roll | Performer: George Gershwin. Gershwin Plays Gershwin: The Piano Rolls. Nonesuch. 12. |
| 10 Nov 2024 | Dame Maggie Aderin-Pocock | Johann Sebastian Bach | Brandenburg Concerto No. 3 in G major | Orchestra: Concerto Italiano. Conductor: Rinaldo Alessandrini. J. S. Bach: Brandenburg Concertos: Concerto Italiano. Naive. 14 & 15. |
| 17 Nov 2024 | Rupert Everett | George Frideric Handel | I know that my Redeemer liveth (Messiah) | Singer: Carolyn Sampson. Choir: The Sixteen. Conductor: Harry Christophers. Coro |
| 17 Nov 2024 | Rupert Everett | Maurice Ravel | Piano Concerto in G major (2nd movement) | Performer: Jean-Efflam Bavouzet. Orchestra: BBC Symphony Orchestra. Conductor: Yan Pascal Tortelier. Debussy/Ravel: Works For Piano and Orchestra. chandos. 2. |
| 17 Nov 2024 | Rupert Everett | Richard Wagner | Parsifal: Act I. Prelude | Orchestra: Hallé. Conductor: Mark Elder. Halle. |
| 17 Nov 2024 | Rupert Everett | Vangelis | Love Theme (Blade Runner) | Blade Runner (Music From The Original Soundtrack). EastWest U.K. 5. |
| 17 Nov 2024 | Rupert Everett | Johann Sebastian Bach | Concerto in D minor for two violins, BWV 1043 (1st movement) | Performer: Petra Müllejans. Performer: Gottfried von der Goltz. Orchestra: Freiburg Baroque Orchestra. Harmonia Mundi. |
| 17 Nov 2024 | Rupert Everett | Ludwig van Beethoven | Symphony No. 9 in D minor, Op. 125, 'Choral' (3rd movement) | Conductor: Günter Wand. Orchestra: North German Radio Symphony Orchestra. Beethoven: Symphonies 1-9: Wand, NDR-Sinfonieorchester. RCA Classics. 3. |
| 17 Nov 2024 | Rupert Everett | Gustav Mahler | Das Lied von der Erde: Von der Schonheit | Singer: Kathleen Ferrier. Orchestra: Vienna Philharmonic. Conductor: Bruno Walter. Decca. |
| 17 Nov 2024 | Rupert Everett | Henry Purcell | "When I am laid in earth" (from Dido and Aeneas) | Singer: Joyce DiDonato. Orchestra: Il Pomo d'Oro. Conductor: Maxim Emelyanychev. ERATO. |
| 24 Nov 2024 | Lola Young, Baroness Young of Hornsey | Giacomo Puccini | "Che gelida manina" (La boheme) | Singer: Roberto Alagna. Orchestra: Philharmonia Orchestra. Conductor: Sir Antonio Pappano. L'enchanteur. Warner Classics. 1. |
| 24 Nov 2024 | Lola Young, Baroness Young of Hornsey | Gustav Holst | "Mars" (The Planets) | Orchestra: Berliner Philharmoniker. Conductor: Herbert von Karajan. Holst: The Planets. Deutsche Grammophon (DG). 1. |
| 24 Nov 2024 | Lola Young, Baroness Young of Hornsey | Anthony Newley | "Feeling Good" | Composer: Leslie Bricusse. Lyricist: Anthony Newley. Lyricist: Leslie Bricusse. Music arranger: Hal Mooney. Singer: Nina Simone. The Very Best Of. RCA Records Label. 3. |
| 24 Nov 2024 | Lola Young, Baroness Young of Hornsey | Maurice Ravel | Bolero | Orchestra: London Symphony Orchestra. Conductor: Pierre Monteux. Ravel: Orchestral Favourites. Decca Music Group Ltd. 18. |
| 24 Nov 2024 | Lola Young, Baroness Young of Hornsey | Philip Glass | Serra Pelada (Powaqqatsi) | Conductor: Michael Riesman. Powaqqatsi. Nonesuch. 1. |
| 24 Nov 2024 | Lola Young, Baroness Young of Hornsey | Philip Herbert | Elegy for 18 strings (In Memoriam Stephen Lawrence) | Orchestra: Chineke! Orchestra. Conductor: Anthony Parnther. Spark Catchers. NMC. |
| 24 Nov 2024 | Lola Young, Baroness Young of Hornsey | Errollyn Wallen | Photography (1st movement) | Orchestra: Orchestra X. Conductor: Nicholas Kok. NMC. |
| 24 Nov 2024 | Lola Young, Baroness Young of Hornsey | Fela Kuti | "Colonial Mentality" | Singer: Fela Kuti. Anthology 2. Wrasse Records Ltd (UK). 1. |
| 24 Nov 2024 | Lola Young, Baroness Young of Hornsey | Paul Simon | "Bridge Over Troubled Water" | Ensemble: Simon & Garfunkel. The Essential Simon & Garfunkel. Columbia/Legacy. 8. |
| 8 Dec 2024 | Nick Mohammed | Sergey Prokofiev | The Young Juliet (Romeo and Juliet) | Orchestra: Royal Philharmonic Orchestra. Conductor: Vladimir Ashkenazy. Romeo and Juliet. DECCA. 10. |
| 8 Dec 2024 | Nick Mohammed | Nikolai Rimsky-Korsakov | Scheherazade, Op. 35 (The Young Prince and Princess) | Performer: Maria Larionoff. Conductor: Gerard Schwarz. Orchestra: Seattle Symphony. Rimsky-Korsakov: Sheherazade/Tale of Tsar Saltan Suite. 3. |
| 8 Dec 2024 | Nick Mohammed | Nikolai Rimsky-Korsakov | Symphony No. 2 in D major, Op. 43: III. Vivacissimo + IV. Finale | Orchestra: Philharmonia Orchestra. Conductor: Herbert von Karajan. Herbert von Karajan: Sibelius. Warner Classics. 3. |
| 8 Dec 2024 | Nick Mohammed | George Gershwin | An American in Paris for orchestra | Orchestra: Hollywood Bowl Symphony Orchestra. Conductor: Felix Slatkin. Gershwin: Rhapsody in Blue etc., Pennario, Felix Slatkin. EMI Classics. 2. |
| 8 Dec 2024 | Nick Mohammed | John Williams | Jurassic Park (main theme) | Orchestra: Studio Orchestra. Conductor: John Williams. Jurassic Park: Music from the Original Motion Picture Soundtrack. MCA Records. 2. |
| 8 Dec 2024 | Nick Mohammed | Ludwig van Beethoven | Symphony No. 7 in A major, Op. 92 (4th movement) | Orchestra: Vienna Philharmonic. Conductor: Carlos Kleiber. Deutsche Grammophon |
| 8 Dec 2024 | Nick Mohammed | Aaron Copland | Appalachian Spring Suite (No. 8) | Orchestra: New York Philharmonic. Conductor: Leonard Bernstein. Copland: Appalachian Spring: New York Philharmonic/Bernstein. Sony Classical. 8. |
| 8 Dec 2024 | Nick Mohammed | Antonín Dvořák | The Noonday Witch, Op. 108 | Orchestra: Royal Concertgebouw Orchestra. Conductor: Nikolaus Harnoncourt. Symphony No. 8: The Noon Witch. Teldec. 8. |
| 8 Dec 2024 | Nick Mohammed | Dmitri Shostakovich | Symphony No. 5 in D minor, Op. 47: 4th movement; Allegro non troppo | Orchestra: Boston Symphony Orchestra. Conductor: Andris Nelsons. Shostakovich: Under Stalin's Shadow, Symphonies No. 5/8/9. DG. 9. |
| 22 Dec 2024 | Christmas Collection | Gustaf Nordqvist | Jul, jul, strålande jul | Choir: Adolf Fredriks Ungdomskör. Lucia – En klassisk högtid. Cupol. 6. |
| 22 Dec 2024 | Christmas Collection | George Frideric Handel | "For unto us a child is born" (Messiah) | Choir: The English Concert Choir. Orchestra: The English Concert. Conductor: John Nelson. Handel: Messiah, HWV 56. Warner Classics. 12. |
| 22 Dec 2024 | Christmas Collection | Gustav Holst | "In the Bleak Midwinter" | Choir: Choir of King’s College, Cambridge. Director: Stephen Cleobury. EMI. |
| 22 Dec 2024 | Christmas Collection | Claude Debussy | "The Snow is Dancing" (Children's Corner) | Performer: Alain Planès. Debussy: Children's Corner: Alain Planes. Harmonia Mundi. 10. |
| 22 Dec 2024 | Christmas Collection | Victor Hely-Hutchinson | Carol Symphony | Orchestra: The City of Prague Philharmonic Orchestra. Conductor: Gavin Sutherland. A Carol Symphony and other Christmas Orchestral Favourites. Naxos. 6-9. |
| 22 Dec 2024 | Christmas Collection | Jake Thackray | "Remember Bethlehem" | Singer: Jake Thackray. Jake In A Box (The EMI Recordings 1967–1976). Parlophone UK. 12. |
| 22 Dec 2024 | Christmas Collection | Percy Grainger | The Sussex Mummers' Christmas Carol | Performer: Kenneth Sillito. Performer: Hamish Milne. The Grainger Edition, CHANDOS |
| 22 Dec 2024 | Christmas Collection | Pyotr Ilyich Tchaikovsky | The Nutcracker (Overture) | Orchestra: Los Angeles Philharmonic. Conductor: Gustavo Dudamel. Tchaikovsky: The Nutcracker, Op. 71, TH 14 (Live at Walt Disney Concert Hall, Lo. Deutsche Grammophon (DG). 1. |
| 22 Dec 2024 | Christmas Collection | Benjamin Britten | Corpus Christi Carol | Composer: Jeff Buckley. Performer: Jeff Buckley. Grace. Sony Music Entertainment UK Ltd. 8. |
| 22 Dec 2024 | Christmas Collection | Hildegard von Bingen | "Quia ergo femina mortem instruxit" | Ensemble: Ensemble for Medieval Music. Canticles of Ecstasy. deutsche harmonia mundi. 003. |
| 22 Dec 2024 | Christmas Collection | Gioachino Rossini | "Dried Figs" from Sins of Old Age Book 4 Piano Pieces | Performer: Marco Sollini. Rossini Complete Piano Edition Vol 2. Chandos. 1. |
| 22 Dec 2024 | Christmas Collection | Ralph Vaughan Williams | "Ca' the Yowes" | Choir: Laudibus. Ralph Vaughan Williams: A Cappella Choral Works. Delphian Records. 14. |
| 22 Dec 2024 | Christmas Collection | Michael Praetorius | "In dulci jubilo" (Christmas Mass) | Ensemble: Gabrieli Consort. Singer: Susan Hemington Jones. Singer: Tessa Bonner. Singer: Mark le Brocq. Choir: Boy's Choir of Roskilde Cathedral. Conductor: Paul McCreesh. Praetorius, M: Lutheran Mass for Christmas Morning. ARCHIV. 23. |
| 22 Dec 2024 | Christmas Collection | Michael Berkeley | "Released by Love" | Choir: BBC Singers. Conductor: Owain Park. Collaborations. Orchid Classics. 24. |
| 29 Dec 2024 | Sister Mary Joy Langdon | Edvard Grieg | Morning Mood, Op. 23, No. 13 (Peer Gynt) | Orchestra: Gothenburg Symphony Orchestra. Conductor: Neeme Järvi. Grieg: Complete music with orchestra: Gothenburg SO/Jarvi. Deutsche Grammophon. 14. |
| 29 Dec 2024 | Sister Mary Joy Langdon | Ludwig van Beethoven | Symphony No. 6 in F major Pastoral (5th movement) | Orchestra: Britten Sinfonia. Conductor: Thomas Adès. Signum Classics |
| 29 Dec 2024 | Sister Mary Joy Langdon | Giuseppe Verdi | "Gloria all'Egitto" (Aida) | Choir: Chorus of the Royal Opera House, Covent Garden. Orchestra: Orchestra of the Royal Opera House, Covent Garden. Conductor: Lamberto Gardelli. Verdi: Aida: Chorus and Orchestra of the ROH. EMI. 14. |
| 29 Dec 2024 | Sister Mary Joy Langdon | Wolfgang Amadeus Mozart | "Ave verum corpus" | Choir: Cologne Chamber Chorus. Orchestra: Collegium Cartusianum. Conductor: Peter Neumann. Mozart: Sämtliche Messen / Complete Masses. Warner Classics. 15. |
| 29 Dec 2024 | Sister Mary Joy Langdon | Andrew Lloyd Webber | "Pie Jesu" (Requiem) | Singer: Aled Jones. One Voice: Believe. Decca (UMO) (Classics). 2. |
| 29 Dec 2024 | Sister Mary Joy Langdon | Johann Sebastian Bach | Toccata in D minor | Performer: Ton Koopman. Archiv. |
| 29 Dec 2024 | Sister Mary Joy Langdon | Johann Strauss II | The Blue Danube – Waltz | Orchestra: London Philharmonic Orchestra. Conductor: Franz Welser‐Möst. J. Strauss II: Waltzes & Overtures. Warner Classics. 107. |
| 29 Dec 2024 | Sister Mary Joy Langdon | Hermann Koenig | "Post Horn Galop" | Ensemble: Band of HM Royal Marines. Filbert Street Blues. Cherry Red Records. 4. |
| 29 Dec 2024 | Sister Mary Joy Langdon | Juliette Pochin | "Veni Creator Spiritus" | Composer: James Morgan. Lyricist: Trad.. Choir: Poor Clares of Arundel. Conductor: Juliette Pochin. Light for the World. Decca (UMO) (Classics). 1. |

== 2025 ==
| Date | Guest | Composer | Title | Performer |
|---|---|---|---|---|
| 5 Jan 2025 | Miranda Hart | Wolfgang Amadeus Mozart | Clarinet Concerto in A major, K.622 (2nd movement, Adagio) | Performer: Annelien Van Wauwe. Orchestra: Nordwestdeutsche Philharmonie. Conductor: Andrew Manze. PENTATONE |
| 5 Jan 2025 | Miranda Hart | Georges Bizet | "Au fond du temple saint" (The Pearl Fishers) | Singer: Luciano Pavarotti. Singer: Nicolaï Ghiaurov. Orchestra: National Philharmonic Orchestra. Conductor: Robin Stapleton. Pavarotti The 50 Greatest Tracks. Decca Music Group Ltd. 8. |
| 5 Jan 2025 | Miranda Hart | Arthur Kent | "Bring Me Sunshine" | Lyricist: Sylvia Dee. Ensemble: The Jive Aces. King of the Swingers. GoldenAge Recordings. 16. |
| 5 Jan 2025 | Miranda Hart | Johann Sebastian Bach | Viola da gamba Sonata in G minor, BWV.1029 (2nd movement) | Performer: Daniel Müller‐Schott. Performer: Angela Hewitt. Bach: Viola da gamba Sonatas. Orfeo. 10. |
| 5 Jan 2025 | Miranda Hart | Camille Saint‐Saëns | "Carnival of the Animals" (The Elephant) | Performer: Sir Antonio Pappano. Performer: Libero Lanzilotta. Warner Classics |
| 5 Jan 2025 | Miranda Hart | Richard Rodgers | "Climb Ev'ry Mountain" (The Sound of Music) | Lyricist: Oscar Hammerstein II. Singer: Peggy Wood. Conductor: Irwin Kostal. The Sound Of Music(Original Soundtrack Recording). Craft Recordings. 12. |
| 5 Jan 2025 | Miranda Hart | Edvard Grieg | Piano Concerto in A minor (1st movement) | Performer: Alice Sara Ott. Orchestra: Bavarian Radio Symphony Orchestra. Conductor: Esa‐Pekka Salonen. UME – Global Clearing House |
| 5 Jan 2025 | Miranda Hart | Harry Glasson | "Cornwall My Home" | Ensemble: The Fisherman’s Friends. Cornwall My Home. Universal-Island Records Ltd. 1. |
| 5 Jan 2025 | Miranda Hart | Ben Bernie | "Sweet Georgia Brown" | Composer: Maceo Pinkard. Performer: Yehudi Menuhin. Performer: Stéphane Grappelli. Music arranger: Max Harris. Director: Max Harris. Icon: Menuhin and Grappelli. Warner Classics. 12. |
| 5 Jan 2025 | Miranda Hart | Morten Lauridsen | "O Magnum Mysterium" | Ensemble: Chamber Choir of Europe. Conductor: Nicol Matt. Bayer Records |
| 12 Jan 2025 | Sir Paul Collier | Martín Codax | Cantigas de amigo: I. Ondas do mar de vigo | Singer: Mara Kiek. Choir: Sinfonye. Director: Stevie Wishart. Bella Domna: The Medieval Woman – Lover, Poet, Patroness & Saint. Hyperion. 1. |
| 12 Jan 2025 | Sir Paul Collier | Franz Schubert | Ständchen (Schwanengesang, D 957) | Performer: Gerald Moore. Singer: Dietrich Fischer‐Dieskau. Deutsche Grammophon |
| 12 Jan 2025 | Sir Paul Collier | William Lawes | Suite No. 2 (1st movement) | Performer: Sigiswald Kuijken. Performer: Lucy van Dael. Performer: Wieland Kuijken. Performer: Toyohiko Satoh. Director: Gustav Leonhardt. Lawes: The Royal Consort & Songs for Countertenor and Lute. RCA Victor. 1. |
| 12 Jan 2025 | Sir Paul Collier | Anon | Magnus miles mirabilis | Choir: Magnificat. Conductor: Philip Cave. Griffin Records. |
| 12 Jan 2025 | Sir Paul Collier | Johann Sebastian Bach | Suite in E minor, BWV 996 (1st movement) | Performer: Julian Bream. Warner Classics |
| 12 Jan 2025 | Sir Paul Collier | Giovanni Pierluigi da Palestrina | Kyrie (Missa Papae Marcelli) | Choir: Tallis Scholars. Director: Peter Phillips. Live in Rome: The Tallis Scholars. Gimell. 3. |
| 12 Jan 2025 | Sir Paul Collier | Franz Schubert | String Quintet in C (2nd movement) | Performer: Mstislav Rostropovich. Ensemble: Melos Quartett. Schubert: String Quintet D956. Deutsche Grammophon (DG). 2. |
| 12 Jan 2025 | Sir Paul Collier | José Carlos Ary dos Santos | Alfama | Singer: Amália Rodrigues. Coimbra. BCD/3RDP. 8. |
| 12 Jan 2025 | Sir Paul Collier | Manuel de Novas | "Tudo Tem Se Limite" | Singer: Cesária Évora. Cesaria. Lusafrica. 3. |
| 12 Jan 2025 | Sir Paul Collier | Gustav Mahler | "Ich bin der Welt abhanden gekommen" (Rückert-Lieder) | Performer: Gerold Huber. Singer: Christian Gerhaher. Christian Gerhaher: Mahler Lieder. RCA Red Seal. 19. |
| 12 Jan 2025 | Sir Paul Collier | Benjamin Britten | Cello Suite No. 1, Op. 72: Canto primo (Sostenuto e largamente) | Performer: Mstislav Rostropovich. Britten: Cello Suites Nos 1 & 2, Cello Symphony (The Russian Years). Warner Classics. 1. |
| 2 Feb 2025 | Professor Anthony Kessel | Astor Piazzolla | "Oblivion" | Music arranger: Carducci String Quartet. Ensemble: Carducci String Quartet. Carducci Chill Out Spotify playlist. Carducci Classics. 1. |
| 2 Feb 2025 | Professor Anthony Kessel | Johannes Brahms | Violin Concerto in D major, Op. 77 (3rd movement) | Performer: Itzhak Perlman. Orchestra: Chicago Symphony Orchestra. Conductor: Carlo Maria Giulini. Brahms: Violin Concerto. Warner Classics. 103. |
| 2 Feb 2025 | Professor Anthony Kessel | Alain Souchon | Foule sentimentale | Performer: Chilly Gonzales. Souchon dans l'air (Vol. 1). Universal Music Division Label Panthéon. 1. |
| 2 Feb 2025 | Professor Anthony Kessel | Samuel Barber | Adagio for Strings | Orchestra: Berliner Philharmoniker. Conductor: Sir Simon Rattle. Dance of the Blessed Spirits. Warner Classics. 52. |
| 2 Feb 2025 | Professor Anthony Kessel | Tom Waits | "Martha" | Singer: Tom Waits. Closing Time. Elektra. 6. |
| 2 Feb 2025 | Professor Anthony Kessel | Antonín Dvořák | Serenade for Strings (2nd movement) | Orchestra: Vienna Philharmonic. Conductor: Myung-Whun Chung. Dvorák: Serenades for Strings and Winds. Deutsche Grammophon (DG). 2. |
| 2 Feb 2025 | Professor Anthony Kessel | Andrea Morricone | Cinema Paradiso (Love Theme) | Performer: Itzhak Perlman. Music arranger: Angela Morricone. Orchestra: Pittsburgh Symphony Orchestra. Conductor: John Williams. The Essential Itzhak Perlman. Sony Classical. 7. |
| 2 Feb 2025 | Professor Anthony Kessel | Max Bruch | Kol Nidrei | Performer: Yuri Abramovich Bashmet. Orchestra: London Symphony Orchestra. Conductor: Neeme Järvi. Yuri Bashmet. RCA Red Seal |
| 2 Feb 2025 | Professor Anthony Kessel | Mishka Stein | "Look At You" | Composer: Joe Grass. Composer: Evan Tighe. Composer: Jules Buckley. Composer: Patrick Watson. Lyricist: Patrick Watson. Singer: Patrick Watson. Wave. Domino Recording Co. 8. |
| 9 Feb 2025 | Ursula Jones | Arthur Honegger | "The Dance Before the Ark" (King David) | Choir: Lausanne Vocal Ensemble. Orchestra: Orchestre de la Suisse Romande. Conductor: Daniel Reuss. Honegger: Le Roi David. Mirare. 16. |
| 9 Feb 2025 | Ursula Jones | Ralph Benatzky | Im weissen Rossl | Singer: Peter Alexander. Kino Schlager, Vol. 1. Documents 2. 6. |
| 9 Feb 2025 | Ursula Jones | Ludwig van Beethoven | Symphony No. 9 "Choral" (2nd movement) | Orchestra: Philharmonia Orchestra. Conductor: Wilhelm Furtwängler. SYMPHONY No. 9 "CHORAL". Nar Classical. 2. |
| 9 Feb 2025 | Ursula Jones | Modest Mussorgsky | Pictures at an Exhibition: Samuel Goldenberg & Schmuyle, Promenade V, Limoges Mar | Music arranger: Elgar Howarth. Ensemble: Philip Jones Brass Ensemble. Conductor: Elgar Howarth. Pictures at an Exhibition/ The Carnival of the Animals. Decca. 7. |
| 9 Feb 2025 | Ursula Jones | Benjamin Britten | Passacaglia (Cello Symphony) | Performer: Mstislav Rostropovich. Orchestra: English Chamber Orchestra. Conductor: Benjamin Britten. Britten Conducts Britten Vol. 4. Decca Music Group Ltd. 4. |
| 9 Feb 2025 | Ursula Jones | Wolfgang Amadeus Mozart | Concerto for 2 Pianos K.365 (3rd movement) | Performer: Vladimir Ashkenazy. Performer: Daniel Barenboim. Orchestra: English Chamber Orchestra. Conductor: Daniel Barenboim. Mozart: Piano Concertos Nos. 7 & 10. Decca Music Group Ltd. 6. |
| 9 Feb 2025 | Ursula Jones | Henry Purcell | "Thy hand, Belinda..." "When I am laid" (Dido and Aeneas) | Singer: Janet Baker. Orchestra: English Chamber Orchestra. Conductor: Anthony Lewis. Dido and Aeneas. DECCA. 16. |
| 9 Feb 2025 | Ursula Jones | Witold Lutosławski | Mini Overture | Ensemble: Philip Jones Brass Ensemble. PJBE Finale: Music Written for Philip Jones. Chandos. 14. |
| 9 Feb 2025 | Ursula Jones | Traditional Swiss folk song | "The Cuckoo" | Performer: John Fletcher. Performer: Philip Jones. Music arranger: Elgar Howarth. Ensemble: Philip Jones Brass Ensemble. Philip Jones Brass Ensemble in Switzerland. Claves Records. 7. |
| 23 Feb 2025 | Daniel Levitin | Ludwig van Beethoven | Symphony No. 6 in F "Pastoral" (1st movement) | Orchestra: Berliner Philharmoniker. Conductor: Herbert von Karajan. Beethoven: Symphonies Nos. 5 & 6 "Pastorale". Deutsche Grammophon (DG). 5. |
| 23 Feb 2025 | Daniel Levitin | Thelonious Monk | "Well You Needn't" | Performer: Thelonious Monk. Piano Solo. Vogue. 4. |
| 23 Feb 2025 | Daniel Levitin | Antonín Dvořák | Symphony No. 7 in D minor (4th movement) | Orchestra: Los Angeles Philharmonic. Conductor: André Previn. Telarc |
| 23 Feb 2025 | Daniel Levitin | Claude Debussy | Jardins sous la pluie (Estampes) | Performer: Aldo Ciccolini. Debussy: Complete Piano Works, Fantaisie for Piano and Orchestra & Songs. Warner Classics. 3. |
| 23 Feb 2025 | Daniel Levitin | John Lennon | Dear Prudence | Composer: Paul McCartney. Music arranger: Eric Milnes. Ensemble: Les Boréades de Montréal. Conductor: Eric Milnes. Beatles Baroque (Vol. 1). ATMA Classique. 10. |
| 23 Feb 2025 | Daniel Levitin | Ludwig van Beethoven | Piano Sonata in C minor "Pathétique" (2nd movement) | Performer: Mari Kodama. Beethoven: Piano Sonatas No. 14, 4 & 8. PENTATONE. 9. |
| 23 Feb 2025 | Daniel Levitin | Gustav Mahler | Symphony No. 3 in D minor (3rd movement) | Orchestra: German Symphony Orchestra Berlin. Conductor: Kent Nagano. Warner Classics International |
| 23 Feb 2025 | Daniel Levitin | Johann Sebastian Bach | The Well-Tempered Clavier, Book II, Prelude and Fugue No. 19 in A major | Performer: Daniel Barenboim. Warner Classics |
| 23 Feb 2025 | Daniel Levitin | Nusrat Fateh Ali Khan | "My Heart, My Life" | Composer: Michael Brook. Performer: Michael Brook. Singer: Nusrat Fateh Ali Khan. Night Song. Real World Records. 1. |
| 9 Mar 2025 | Sian Williams | Antonio Vivaldi | Violin Concerto in E major 'Spring' | Performer: Adrian Chandler. Ensemble: La Serenissima. Vivaldi: The Four Seasons. Avie. 1-3. |
| 9 Mar 2025 | Sian Williams | Ludwig van Beethoven | Piano Sonata in C♯ minor, Op. 27, No. 2 'Moonlight' | Performer: Radu Lupu. |
| 9 Mar 2025 | Sian Williams | Sergey Rachmaninov | Piano Concerto No. 3 in D minor (1st movement) | Performer: Lang Lang. Orchestra: St. Petersburg Philharmonic Orchestra. Conductor: Yuri Temirkanov. Telarc |
| 9 Mar 2025 | Sian Williams | Cristóbal de Morales | Parce mihi domine – Improvisation [from Officium defunctorum] | Ensemble: The Hilliard Ensemble. Officium. ECM. 1. |
| 9 Mar 2025 | Sian Williams | Catrin Finch | "Ceffylau" (Horses) | Composer: Seckou Keita. Performer: Catrin Finch. Performer: Seckou Keita. The Ultimate Guide to Welsh Folk (compiled by Cerys Matthews). ARC. 7. |
| 9 Mar 2025 | Sian Williams | Max Richter | "On the Nature of Daylight" | Performer: Louisa Fuller. Performer: John Metcalf. Performer: Philip Sheppard. Performer: Chris Worsey. Deutsche Grammophon (DG) |
| 9 Mar 2025 | Sian Williams | John Hughes | "Calon Lân" | Lyricist: Daniel James. Music arranger: Jon Cohen. Choir: The Fron Male Voice Choir. Singer: Cerys Matthews. Orchestra: Czech Film Orchestra. Conductor: Cliff Masterson. Voices Of The Valley Home. Decca (UMO). 6. |
| 9 Mar 2025 | Sian Williams | Anna Clyne | Cello Concerto, 'Dance' (3rd movement, 'in the middle of the fighting') | Performer: Inbal Segev. Orchestra: London Philharmonic Orchestra. Conductor: Marin Alsop. AVIE Records |
| 9 Mar 2025 | Sian Williams | Toumani Diabaté | Jarabi | Performer: Toumani Diabaté. Performer: Danny Thompson. Ensemble: Ketama. Songhai. Universal Music Operations Ltd. 1. |
| 23 Mar 2025 | Bob Crowley | Giuseppe Verdi | Libiamo ne' lieti calici (La traviata) | Singer: Angela Gheorghiu. Singer: Frank Lopardo. Choir: Chorus of the Royal Opera House, Covent Garden. Orchestra: Orchestra of the Royal Opera House, Covent Garden. Conductor: Georg Solti. Verdi: La Traviata. Decca Music Group Ltd. 3. |
| 23 Mar 2025 | Bob Crowley | Thomas Tallis | "If Ye Love Me" | Choir: Alamire. Conductor: David Skinner. Queen Katherine Parr & Songs of Reformation. Obsidian. 8. |
| 23 Mar 2025 | Bob Crowley | Träd | "Down by the Salley Gardens" | Singer: Maura O’Connell. Wandering Home. Ryko/Rhino |
| 23 Mar 2025 | Bob Crowley | Igor Stravinsky | Serenata (Pulcinella Suite) | Orchestra: New York Philharmonic. Conductor: Kurt Masur. Stravinsky: Pulcinella Suite (Recorded 1999). New York Philharmonic. 2. |
| 23 Mar 2025 | Bob Crowley | Orazio Benevoli | Magnificat for 16 voices | Ensemble: Le Concert Spirituel. Conductor: Hervé Niquet. Benevolo: Maissa Si Deus Pro Nobis & Magnificat. Alpha. 15. |
| 23 Mar 2025 | Bob Crowley | Joni Mitchell | "Song for Sharon" | Singer: Joni Mitchell. Songs of a Prairie Girl. Rhino/Elektra. 9. |
| 23 Mar 2025 | Bob Crowley | Richard Rodgers | "If I loved you" (Carousel) | Librettist: Oscar Hammerstein II. Singer: Joanna Riding. Singer: Michael Hayden. The Songs of Richard Rodgers & Oscar Hammerstein II. Arts Music. 10. |
| 23 Mar 2025 | Bob Crowley | Percy Grainger | "Shallow Brown" | Singer: John Shirley‐Quirk. Choir: Ambrosian Singers. Orchestra: English Chamber Orchestra. Conductor: Benjamin Britten. Salute to Percy Grainger. London. 14. |
| 23 Mar 2025 | Bob Crowley | George Gershwin | An American In Paris | Orchestra: New York Philharmonic. Conductor: Leonard Bernstein. Gershwin: Symphonic Dances from West Side Story; Candide Overture; Rhapsody in B. Sony Classical. 12. |
| 23 Mar 2025 | Bob Crowley | Stephen Sondheim | "A Weekend in the Country" (A Little Night Music) | Lyricist: Stephen Sondheim. Ensemble: Original Broadway Cast of A Little Night Music. Conductor: Harold Hastings. A Little Night Music (Original Broadway Cast Recording). Masterworks Broadway. 9. |
| 23 Mar 2025 | Bob Crowley | Franz Schubert | Litanei auf das Fest Allerseelen D.343 | Singer: Matthias Goerne. Performer: Helmut Deutsch. Schubert Lieder Vol. 8: Wanderers Nachtlied. Harmonia Mundi. 5. |
| 30 Mar 2025 | Boulez at 100: Gerard McBurney | William Byrd | Mass for 3 voices | Choir: Tallis Scholars. Director: Peter Phillips. The Tallis Scholars Sing William Byrd. Gimell. 11. |
| 30 Mar 2025 | Boulez at 100: Gerard McBurney | Ludwig van Beethoven | Piano Sonata in B♭ Op. 106 "Hammerklavier" (3rd movement) | Performer: Solomon. Beethoven: Piano Sonatas Nos. 29 "Hammerklavier" & 32. Warner Classics. 3. |
| 30 Mar 2025 | Boulez at 100: Gerard McBurney | Gustav Mahler | Symphony No. 10, 3rd movement: Purgatorio | Orchestra: Boston Symphony Orchestra. Conductor: Charles Munch. |
| 30 Mar 2025 | Boulez at 100: Gerard McBurney | Modest Mussorgsky | "Within four walls" (Sunless) | Performer: Alexandre Labinsky. Singer: Boris Christoff. Mussorgsky: Songs. Warner Classics. 11. |
| 30 Mar 2025 | Boulez at 100: Gerard McBurney | Modest Mussorgsky | "Thou didst not know me in the crowd" (Sunless) | Performer: Alexandre Labinsky. Singer: Boris Christoff. Mussorgsky: Songs. Warner Classics. 12. |
| 30 Mar 2025 | Boulez at 100: Gerard McBurney | Dmitri Shostakovich | Piano Sonata No. 2 in B minor (1st movement) | Performer: Maria Yudina. Russian Compact Disc. |
| 30 Mar 2025 | Boulez at 100: Gerard McBurney | Béla Bartók | The Miraculous Mandarin (conclusion) | Orchestra: Chicago Symphony Orchestra. Conductor: Pierre Boulez. Bartók: The Miraculous Mandarin. Deutsche Grammophon (DG). 7. |
| 30 Mar 2025 | Boulez at 100: Gerard McBurney | Pierre Boulez | Dérive 1 | Ensemble: Ensemble intercontemporain. Conductor: Pierre Boulez. Boulez: Le Marteau Sans Maître. Deutsche Grammophon (DG). 10. |
| 30 Mar 2025 | Boulez at 100: Gerard McBurney | Gabriel Fauré | Piano Quintet No. 2 in C minor (1st movement) | Performer: Jean Hubeau. Ensemble: Quatuor Via Nova. Fauré : Piano Quintets & Piano Quartets. Warner Classics International. 4. |
| 30 Mar 2025 | Boulez at 100: Gerard McBurney | Träd | Maccrimmon's Lament | Singer: Jeannie Robertson. Folk Songs & Words of Protest, Vol. 1. Supreme Media. 5. |
| 6 Apr 2025 | Mónica Feria Tinta | Frédéric Chopin ' | "Revolutionary Study" in C minor Op. 10, No. 12 | Performer: Maurizio Pollini. Chopin: Etudes. Deutsche Grammophon (DG). 12. |
| 6 Apr 2025 | Mónica Feria Tinta | Sergey Prokofiev | "Dance of the Knights" (Romeo and Juliet Op. 64) | Orchestra: Boston Symphony Orchestra. Conductor: Seiji Ozawa. Romeo & Juliet Complete Recording. DG. 013. |
| 6 Apr 2025 | Mónica Feria Tinta | Henry Purcell | The Fairy Queen, Z. 629, Act II - If Love's a Sweet Passion | Singer: Anna Dennis. Singer: James Way. Ensemble: Gabrieli Consort. Conductor: Paul McCreesh. Purcell: The Fairy Queen, 1692. Signum Classics. 21. |
| 6 Apr 2025 | Mónica Feria Tinta | Johann Sebastian Bach | Prelude and Fugue No. 1 in C major (The Well-Tempered Clavier) | Performer: Sviatoslav Richter.RCA Gold Seal |
| 6 Apr 2025 | Mónica Feria Tinta | Antonio Vivaldi | "Ah, chi'infelice" from Cantata Cessate, omai cessate | Singer: John Holiday. Ensemble: Academy of Ancient Music. from Academy of Ancient Music YouTube channel. Academy of Ancient Music YouTube channel. 1. |
| 6 Apr 2025 | Mónica Feria Tinta | Jean Sibelius | Violin Concerto in D minor, Op. 47 (1st movement) | Performer: Vilde Frang. Orchestra: WDR Symphony Orchestra. Conductor: Thomas Søndergård. Sibelius Prokofiev: Violin Concerto. EMI. 1. |
| 6 Apr 2025 | Mónica Feria Tinta | Los Incas del Peru | Bajada del Arco (Sicuri 1) | Peru Folklorico Vol. 2. Intershop. 12. |
| 6 Apr 2025 | Mónica Feria Tinta | Dmitri Shostakovich | Suite No. 2 for Jazz Band: Waltz 2 | Orchestra: Royal Concertgebouw Orchestra. Conductor: Riccardo Chailly. Shostakovich: The Jazz Album – Bräutigam, Masseurs. Decca |
| 6 Apr 2025 | Mónica Feria Tinta | Felix Mendelssohn | The Hebrides, Op. 26 | Orchestra: London Symphony Orchestra. Conductor: Claudio Abbado. Mendelssohn: Overtures: LSO/Abbado. Deutsche Grammophon. 7. |
| 6 Apr 2025 | Mónica Feria Tinta | Claudio Monteverdi | "Pur ti miro" (L'incoronazione di Poppea) | Singer: Danielle de Niese. Singer: Andreas Scholl. Orchestra: The English Concert. Conductor: Harry Bicket. Danielle de Niese: Beauty of the Baroque: The English Concert, Harry Bicket. Decca. 7. |
| 13 Apr 2025 | Terry Gilliam | Leonard Bernstein | Candide (Overture) | Orchestra: Candide Orchestra. Conductor: Leonard Bernstein. Candide (Original Broadway Cast Recording). Masterworks Broadway. 1. |
| 13 Apr 2025 | Terry Gilliam | George Washington Johnson | "When You and I Were Young, Maggie Blue" | Composer: James A. Butterfield. Composer: Jimmy McHugh. Composer: Frank Frost. Singer: Cliff Edwards. Singing in the Rain. Audiophile. 29. |
| 13 Apr 2025 | Terry Gilliam | Max Bruch | Violin Concerto No. 1 (1st movement) | Performer: Randall Goosby. Orchestra: Philadelphia Orchestra. Conductor: Yannick Nézet‐Séguin. Bruch: Violin Concerto No. 1; Florence Price: Violin Concertos. Decca Music Group Ltd. 1. |
| 13 Apr 2025 | Terry Gilliam | Nino Rota | "Otto e Mezzo" (Theme) | Conductor: Nino Rota. Otto e Mezzo (Original Motion Picture Soundtrack). Creazioni Artistiche Musicali. 1. |
| 13 Apr 2025 | Terry Gilliam | Frederick Delius | "Over the Hills and Far Away" | Orchestra: Royal Philharmonic Orchestra. Conductor: Thomas Beecham. Sir Thomas Beecham: The English Collection. Warner Classics. 1. |
| 13 Apr 2025 | Terry Gilliam | Hector Berlioz | "Oui, Oui Cette Somme Était" (Benvenuto Cellini) | Singer: Andrew Kennedy. Singer: Andrew Foster-Williams. Singer: Isabelle Cals. Singer: Gregory Kunde. Singer: Alasdair Elliott. Choir: London Symphony Chorus. Orchestra: London Symphony Orchestra. Conductor: Colin Davis. Berlioz: Benvenuto Cellini. LSO Live. 115. |
| 13 Apr 2025 | Terry Gilliam | Richard Strauss | Till Eulenspiegel's Merry Pranks, Op. 28 | Orchestra: Minnesota Orchestra. Conductor: Antal Doráti. The Mercury Masters: Antal Dorati. MERCURY LIVING PRESENCE. 3. |
| 13 Apr 2025 | Terry Gilliam | Ottorino Respighi | Passacaglia (Ancient Airs and Dances) | Orchestra: Berliner Philharmoniker. Conductor: Herbert von Karajan. Deutsche Grammophon (DG) |
| 13 Apr 2025 | Terry Gilliam | Andro Dom | Sza Tele Zsav | Phari Mamo. Network Medien. 3. |
| 20 Apr 2025 | Romola Garai | Michael Nyman | "Prospero's Magic" (Prospero's Books) | Orchestra: Royal Philharmonic Orchestra. Conductor: Jonathan Carney. Michael Nyman. Documents. 8. |
| 20 Apr 2025 | Romola Garai | Keith Jarrett | "Vienna, Part I" | Performer: Keith Jarrett. Vienna Concert. ECM Records. 1. |
| 20 Apr 2025 | Romola Garai | George Frideric Handel | Water Music: Suite No. 2 in D major, HWV 349: Minuet | Orchestra: Collegium Aureum. Collegium Aureum-Edition. Deutsche Harmonia Mundi. 18. |
| 20 Apr 2025 | Romola Garai | John Tavener | The Protecting Veil: I. The Protecting Veil | Lionel Martin performs Tavener. SWR Classic. 1. |
| 20 Apr 2025 | Romola Garai | Florian Fricke | Aguirre I (l'acrime di rei) | Composer: Popol Vuh. Aguirre (Original Motion Picture Soundtrack). BMG Rights Management GmbH. 1. |
| 20 Apr 2025 | Romola Garai | Trad. | "Am I Born To Die?" | Music arranger: Anthony Minghella. Music arranger: Henry Burnett. Cold Mountain (Music From the Miramax Motion Picture). DMZ/Columbia/Sony Music Soundtrax. 7. |
| 20 Apr 2025 | Romola Garai | Alexander Bălănescu | Aria | Ensemble: Bălănescu Quartet. Maria T (reissue). Universal Music Romania. 7. |
| 20 Apr 2025 | Romola Garai | Paul Brady | The Lakes of Pontchartrain | "Welcome Here Kind Stranger". PeeBee Music. 4. |
| 27 Apr 2025 | Colum McCann | Joseph Haydn | Piano Sonata in E♭ (3rd movement) | Performer: Sviatoslav Richter. Richter Plays Haydn/Weber/Beethoven. Decca Music Group Ltd. 6. |
| 27 Apr 2025 | Colum McCann | Sidney Arodin | "Lazy River" | Composer: Hoagy Carmichael. Performer: Hoagy Carmichael. Hoagy Sings Carmichael. Blue Note Records. 10. |
| 27 Apr 2025 | Colum McCann | R. Carlos Nakai | "Song For The Morning Star" | Performer: R. Carlos Nakai. Canyon Trilogy. Canyon Records. 1. |
| 27 Apr 2025 | Colum McCann | Trad. | "Raglan Road" | Music arranger: Van Morrison. Lyricist: Pádraig Caomhánaigh. Music arranger: Paddy Moloney. Singer: Van Morrison. Ensemble: The Chieftains. Irish Heartbeat. Legacy Recordings. 4. |
| 27 Apr 2025 | Colum McCann | Sergey Prokofiev | Piano Concerto No. 3 in C major, Op. 26 (1st movement) | Performer: Martha Argerich. Orchestra: Berliner Philharmoniker. Conductor: Claudio Abbado. 111 Years Of Deutsche Grammophon The Collector's Edition 2. Deutsche Grammophon. 1. |
| 27 Apr 2025 | Colum McCann | Henryk Mikołaj Górecki | Symphony No. 3, Symphony of Sorrowful Songs (2nd movement) | Singer: Joanna Kozłowska. Orchestra: Warsaw Philharmonic Orchestra. Conductor: Kazimierz Kord. Górecki: Symphony No.3. Decca Music Group Ltd. 2. |
| 27 Apr 2025 | Colum McCann | Sting | "The Empty Chair" | Singer: Sting. 57TH & 9TH (Deluxe). A&M. 10. |
| 27 Apr 2025 | Colum McCann | Colm Mac Con Iomaire | The Finnish Line | Performer: Colm Mac Con Iomaire. Other Voices: Courage 2020. Other Voices. 6. |
| 27 Apr 2025 | Colum McCann | Grace Williams | "High Wind" (Sea Sketches) | Orchestra: BBC Philarmonic. Conductor: John Andrews. Grace Williams: Orchestral Works. Resonus Classics. 10. |
| 27 Apr 2025 | Colum McCann | Johannes Brahms | Sonata for Cello and Piano No. 2 in F major, Op. 99: IV. Allegro molto | Performer: Alisa Weilerstein. Performer: Inon Barnatan. Brahms Cello Sonatas. Pentatone. 10. |
| 4 May 2025 | Jonathan Sumption | Nicolaus Bruhns | Prelude in E minor | Performer: Friedhelm Flamme. cpo |
| 4 May 2025 | Jonathan Sumption | Robert Schumann | Piano Quartet in E♭, Op. 47 (3rd movement) | Performer: Alexander Melnikov. Ensemble: Jerusalem Quartet. HARMONIA MUNDI. |
| 4 May 2025 | Jonathan Sumption | Hector Berlioz | "De quels revers" (The Trojans) | Singer: Stephen Milling. Singer: Sara Mingardo. Orchestra: London Symphony Orchestra. Conductor: Colin Davis. Berlioz Odyssey: The Complete Colin Davis Recordings. LSO Live. 39. |
| 4 May 2025 | Jonathan Sumption | Franz Schubert | Symphony No. 9 in C "The Great" (4th movement) | Orchestra: Vienna Philharmonic. Conductor: Georg Solti. Schubert: Symphony No.9 / Wagner: Siegfried Idyll. Decca Music Group Ltd. 4. |
| 4 May 2025 | Jonathan Sumption | Wolfgang Amadeus Mozart | "Soave sia il vento" (from Così fan tutte) | Singer: Sandrine Piau. Singer: Lea Desandre. Singer: Florian Sempey. Orchestra: Insula Orchestra. Conductor: Laurence Equilbey. Erato. |
| 4 May 2025 | Jonathan Sumption | Richard Wagner | Tannhäuser (Overture) | Performer: Tanguy de Williencourt. Music arranger: Franz Liszt. Wagner–Liszt. Mirare. 201. |
| 4 May 2025 | Jonathan Sumption | John Dunstable | Missa Da gaudiorum premia (Sanctus) | Ensemble: The Binchois Consort. Conductor: Andrew Kirkman. Music for the 100 Years' War (1337-1453). Hyperion. |
| 4 May 2025 | Jonathan Sumption | Leoš Janáček | Jenufa opera,ct 2: Jenufa's prayer | Orchestra: Vienna Philharmonic. Conductor: Charles Mackerras. Singer: Elizabeth Soderstrom. Jenufa. Decca. 4. |
| 4 May 2025 | Jonathan Sumption | Benjamin Britten | Four Sea Interludes from Peter Grimes (Dawn) | Orchestra: Bergen Philharmonic Orchestra. Conductor: Neeme Järvi. Britten: Young Persons Guide to the Orchestra: Bergen P.O., Neeme Jarvi. BIS. 6. |
| 4 May 2025 | Jonathan Sumption | Richard Strauss | Moonlight Music (from Capriccio) | Orchestra: Bavarian Radio Symphony Orchestra. Conductor: Karl Böhm. Deutsche Grammophon (DG) |
| 11 May 2025 | Emma Rice | Johann Sebastian Bach | Concerto for oboe and violin in D minor (1st movement) | Performer: Yehudi Menuhin. Performer: Léon Goossens. Orchestra: Bath Festival Orchestra. Conductor: Yehudi Menuhin. Bach: Orchestral Suites & Other Concertos. Warner Classics. 209. |
| 11 May 2025 | Emma Rice | Jake Thackray | "To Do with You" | Singer: Jake Thackray. Jake In A Box (The EMI Recordings 1967–1976). Parlophone UK. 11. |
| 11 May 2025 | Emma Rice | Wolfgang Amadeus Mozart | Horn Concerto No. 3 in E♭ major K. 447 (2nd movement) | Performer: Alec Frank-Gemmill. Orchestra: Swedish Chamber Orchestra. Conductor: Nicholas McGegan. Mozart: Horn Concertos. BIS. 8. |
| 11 May 2025 | Emma Rice | Pyotr Ilyich Tchaikovsky | Piano Trio in A minor, Op. 50: Variations IV–VII | Performer: Gregor Piatigorsky. Performer: Arthur Rubinstein. Performer: Jascha Heifetz. Tchaikovsky: Trio in A minor, Op. 50. RCA Red Seal. 4 -7. |
| 11 May 2025 | Emma Rice | John Tavener | Annunciation (The Protecting Veil) | Ensemble: Sinfonietta Rīga. Performer: Matthew Barley. Tavener: The Protecting Veil. Signum Classics. 203. |
| 11 May 2025 | Emma Rice | Aram Khachaturian | Waltz (Masquerade) | Orchestra: Royal Scottish National Orchestra. Conductor: Neeme Järvi. Khachaturian: Piano Concerto etc. Chandos. 4. |
| 11 May 2025 | Emma Rice | Compay Segundo | "Chan Chan" | Ensemble: Buena Vista Social Club. WORLD CIRCUIT. |
| 11 May 2025 | Emma Rice | Wolfgang Amadeus Mozart | "Protegga il giusto Cielo" (Don Giovanni) | Singer: Renée Fleming. Singer: Ann Murray. Singer: Herbert Lippert. Orchestra: London Philharmonic Orchestra. Conductor: Georg Solti. Mozart: Don Giovanni. Decca Music Group Ltd. 8. |
| 11 May 2025 | Emma Rice | Sergey Rachmaninov | Piano Concerto No. 2 in C minor, Op. 18 (1st movement) | Performer: Krystian Zimerman. Orchestra: Boston Symphony Orchestra. Conductor: Seiji Ozawa. Rachmaninov: Piano Concertos Nos. 1&2 Zimerman/Boston Symphony Orchestra/ Ozawa. Deutsche Grammaphon. 4. |
| 11 May 2025 | Emma Rice | Carlos Santana | "Chill Out (Things Gonna Change)" | Composer: John Lee Hooker. The Best of Friends. BMG Rights Management (US) LLC. 11. |
| 18 May 2025 | Philip Hoare | Johann Strauss II | On the Beautiful Blue Danube | Orchestra: The Vienna Opera Orchestra. Conductor: Alfred Scholz. The Very Best Of Johann Strauss. Stradivari Classics. 1. |
| 18 May 2025 | Philip Hoare | John Kander | Willkommen (Cabaret) | Lyricist: Fred Ebb. Singer: Joel Grey. Conductor: Ralph Burns. Cabaret (Original Soundtrack Recording). Geffen. 1. |
| 18 May 2025 | Philip Hoare | David Bowie | "Art Decade" | Singer: David Bowie. Low (2017 Remaster). Parlophone UK. 9. |
| 18 May 2025 | Philip Hoare | Aaron Copland | Suite from Appalachian Spring: Simple Gifts | Orchestra: BBC Philharmonic Orchestra. Conductor: John Wilson. Copland: Vol. 1 Ballet Suites etc. Chandos. 1. |
| 18 May 2025 | Philip Hoare | Dr. Roger Payne | Solo Whale | Performer: Humpback Whale. Songs of the Humpback Whale. Living Music. 1. |
| 18 May 2025 | Philip Hoare | Benjamin Britten | "Blow her away" (Billy Budd) | Choir: Gentlemen of the Hallé Choir. Choir: Northern Voices. Orchestra: Hallé. Conductor: Kent Nagano. Warner Classics International |
| 18 May 2025 | Philip Hoare | Arvo Pärt | Cantus in memoriam Benjamin Britten | Performer: Juho Vartiainen. Orchestra: Tapiola Sinfonietta. Conductor: Jean‐Jacques Kantorow. Summa. BIS. 5. |
| 18 May 2025 | Philip Hoare | Enoch Mankayi Sontonga | "Nkosi Sikelel' iAfrika" | Music arranger: J. Shabalala. Ensemble: Ladysmith Black Mambazo. Favourites. Gallo Record Company. 14. |
| 18 May 2025 | Philip Hoare | Sergey Prokofiev | March (The Love for Three Oranges – Suite) | Orchestra: São Paulo Symphony Orchestra. Conductor: Marin Alsop. Prokofiev: Orchestral Works. Naxos. 1. |
| 18 May 2025 | Philip Hoare | Caoimhín Ó Raghallaigh | "All Good Things" | Performer: Caoimhín Ó Raghallaigh. Performer: Thomas Bartlett. Caoimhín Ó Raghallaigh & Thomas Bartlett. Real World Records. 3. |
| 18 May 2025 | Philip Hoare | Neil Tennant | "Being Boring" | Composer: Chris Lowe. Ensemble: Pet Shop Boys. NOW – Yearbook 1990. Now! Music |
| 25 May 2025 | Adam Buxton | Arthur Bliss | March (Things to Come) | Ensemble: Geoff Love & His Orchestra. Star Wars And Other Space Themes. Parlophone UK. 7. |
| 25 May 2025 | Adam Buxton | Edvard Grieg | Notturno (Lyric Pieces Op. 54 No. 4) | Performer: Emil Grigoryevich Gilels. Grieg: Lyric Pieces. Deutsche Grammophon (DG). |
| 25 May 2025 | Adam Buxton | Brian Eno | The Pearl | Composer: Harold Budd. The Pearl. Virgin Catalogue. 8. |
| 25 May 2025 | Adam Buxton | Thelonious Monk | "Straight, No Chaser" | Performer: Thelonious Monk. Thelonious Sphere Monk. Documents. 16. |
| 25 May 2025 | Adam Buxton | John Barry | "Zero Gravity" (The Black Hole) | Conductor: John Barry. The Black Hole. Buena Vista Records. 4. |
| 25 May 2025 | Adam Buxton | Jonny Greenwood | "House of Woodcock" | Orchestra: London Contemporary Orchestra. Conductor: Robert Ames. Phantom Thread (Original Motion Picture Soundtrack). Nonesuch. 13. |
| 25 May 2025 | Adam Buxton | Mica Levi | "Vanity" | Jackie (Original Soundtrack Album). Milan Records. 10. |
| 25 May 2025 | Adam Buxton | Gabriel Fauré | Requiem (Introit – Kyrie) | Choir: The Sixteen. Orchestra: Academy of St Martin in the Fields. Conductor: Harry Christophers. Coro |
| 25 May 2025 | Adam Buxton | Trad. Bulgarian | "Polegnala e Todora" | Music arranger: Dobri Hristov. Choir: Bulgarian State Radio & Television Female Vocal Choir. Conductor: Filip Kutev. Le Mystere des Voix Bulgares Vol. 1. Universal Music Division Decca Records France. 13. |
| 25 May 2025 | Adam Buxton | Maurice Ravel | Introduction et danse religieuse (Daphnis and Chloe) | Orchestra: Bordeaux Aquitaine National Orchestra. Choir: Bordeaux Opera Chorus. Conductor: Laurent Petitgirard. Ravel: Daphnis and Chloe. Naxos. 1. |
