= Mélanie Lipinska =

Polish-French physician and historian

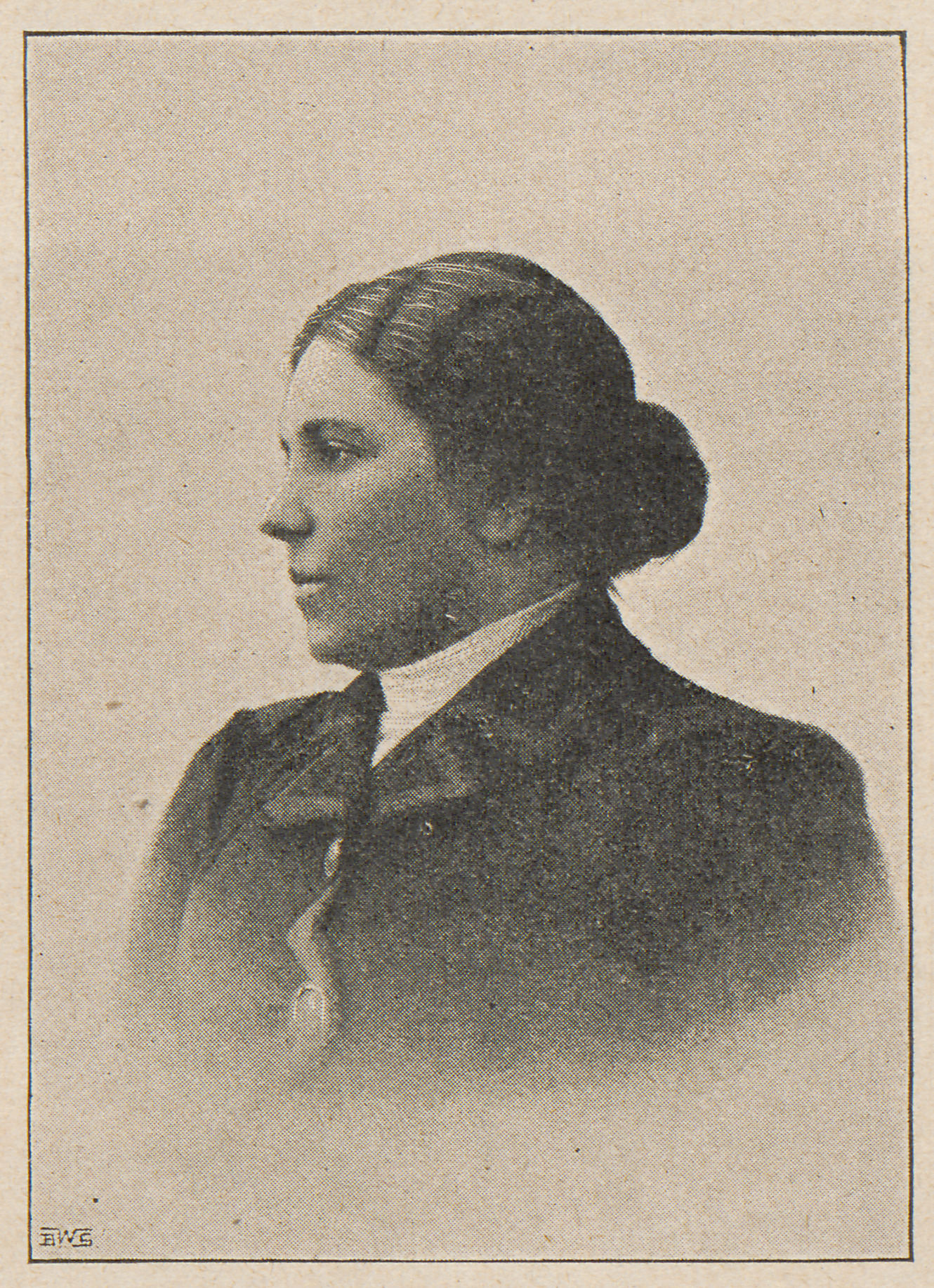
- Born: January 1, 1865; Ostrołęka
- Died: June 27, 1933 (aged 68); Katowice

Mélanie Lipinska (January 1, 1865–June 27, 1933) was a Polish-French physician and known as a historian of women in medicine. She received recognition for her thesis Histoire des femmes médecins, which she submitted to the Académie de médecine de Paris in 1900.

Mélanie Lipinska was born in Ostrołęka, Poland. The area was at the time part of the Russian Empire. Although she was born in Poland, she spent the later part of her life in France. Among other places, her training was in Parisian hospitals. During Lipinska's training, she worked closely with Joséphine Joteyko, a physician and physiologist, one of the first females to become a physician in Poland. She attended the University of Paris medical school.

Lipinska wrote her thesis in 1900 to receive her doctorate in medicine. Her thesis included commentary on the medical writings of Hildegard of Bingen. In 1902 Lipinska received the Victor Hugo Award, a literary award, for her thesis. With this award, she was given an amount of francs. Lipinska is considered a historian of women doctors.

By 1922 Lipinska was blind.

Lipinska later travelled to the United States. She arrived in New York in 1922, and travelled to California where she did research on the blind for the American Society of the Blind.

== Works ==
- Histoire des femmes médecins, depuis l'Antiquité jusqu'à nos jours. Paris, 1900
