= St. Hildegard, Eibingen =

Catholic parish of Saint Hildegard in Eibingen

Coordinates: 49.98588°N 7.928229°E

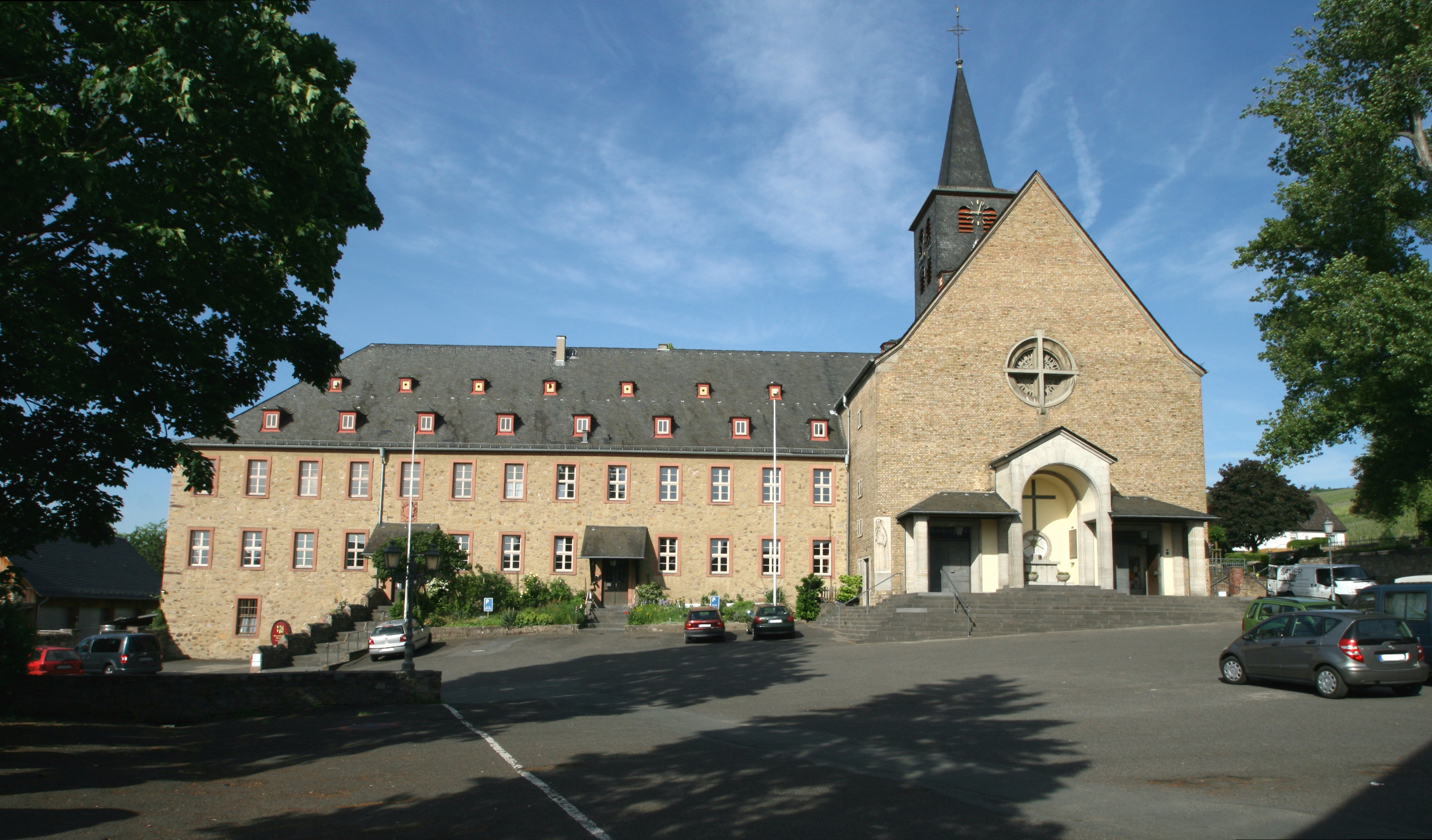
St. Hildegard, Eibingen

St. Hildegard is a Catholic pilgrimage church and a former parish church in Eibingen, part of Rüdesheim am Rhein, Hesse, Germany. Its full name is St. Hildegard und St. Johannes der Täufer because it is not only dedicated to Hildegard of Bingen but also to John the Baptist. It was built on the ruins of the abbey church that Hildegard founded; her relics have been in the church since 1641. The walls around its grounds with a cemetery still date back to her time, as well as monuments in the church's floor. The parish belongs now to the Rheingauer Dom in Geisenheim.

== History ==
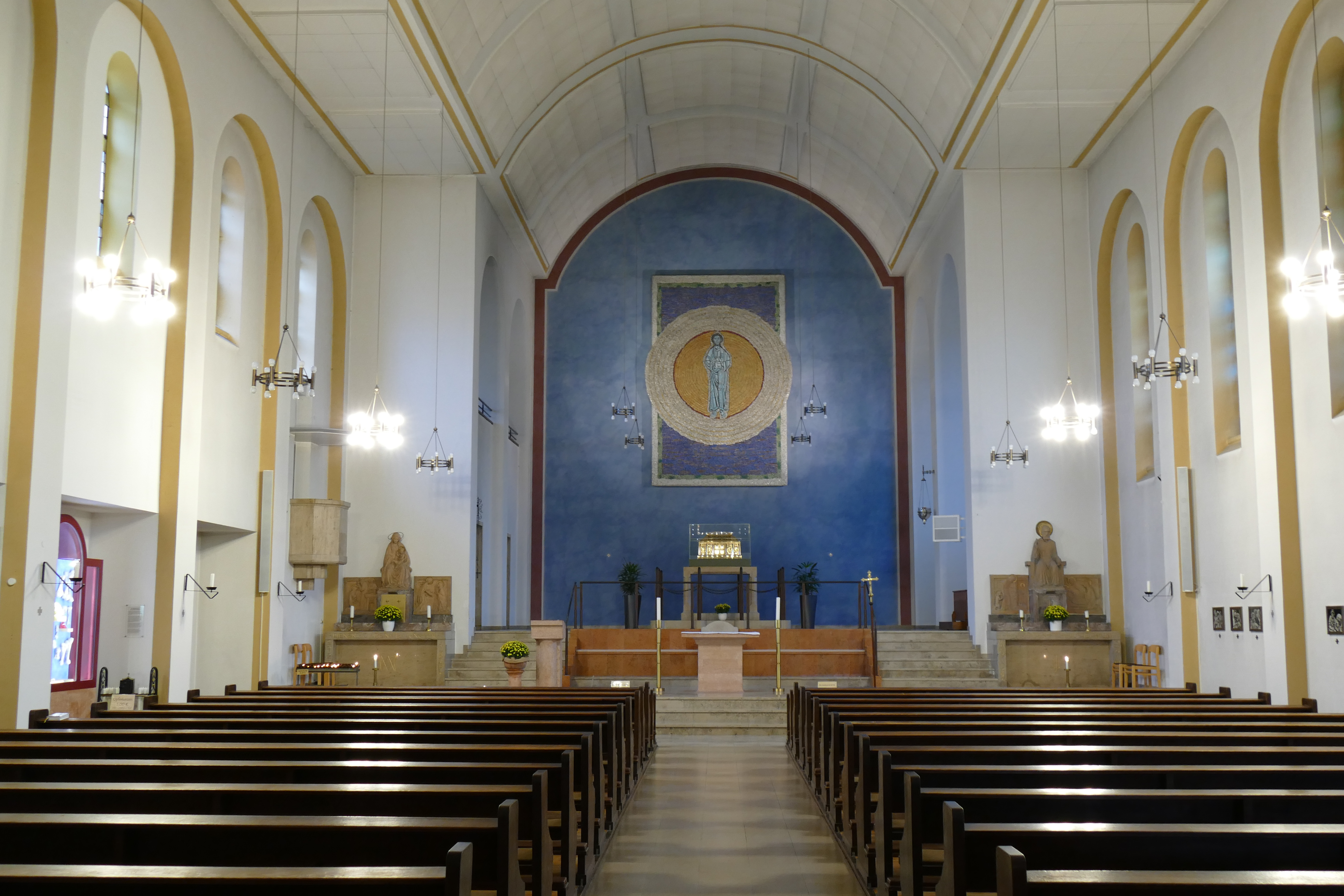
Interior towards shrine

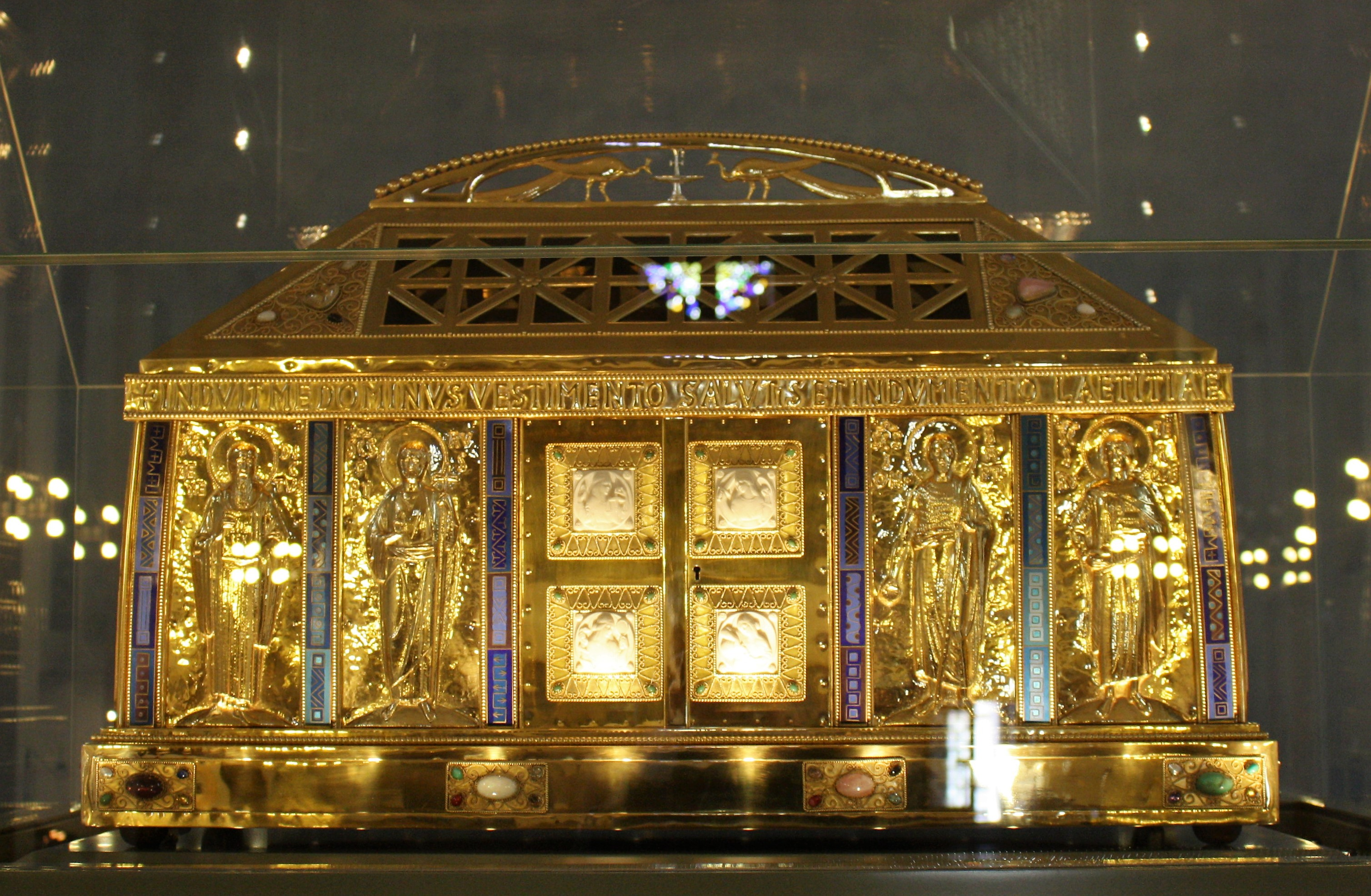
Shrine of St. Hildegard, 1929

In 1148 the noblewoman Marka von Rüdesheim founded a monastery of Augustinians. It was unused after it was destroyed by troops of Frederick Barbarossa, but in 1165 Hildegard of Bingen settled there with Benedictines. Different from her earlier monastery, Rupertsberg Abbey, it was not restricted to noble women. In 1575 only two nuns lived there who then moved to Kloster Marienhausen of Cistercian nuns near Aulhausen. Instead, Augustinian nuns from the Augustiner-Chorfrauenstift near Bad Kreuznach moved into the monastery in Eibingen. In 1603 the abbess of Kloster Rupertsberg achieved that the Eibingen was returned.

When Rupertsberg was destroyed in 1632 by Swedish troops during the Thirty Years War, its nuns moved via Cologne and Mainz into Eibingen in 1641, saving also the relic of Hildegard, the Eibinger Reliquienschatz and manuscripts including her book Scivias.

The church and the monastery were partly rebuilt in 1681 to 1684 by Giovanni Angelo Barella from Mainz, when Scholastica von Manteuffel was abbess, and again from 1736 to 1752 by Johann Valentin Thomann, also from Mainz. The basement and walls from Hildegard's time were retained.

In 1802 the monastery was closed during the and in 1814 emptied. The complete fixtures were sold to the Rochuskapelle, including the relics of Rupert von Bingen and his mother, Berta von Bingen. The Eibinger Reliquienschatz remained in the Eibingen church. The church's southwing and west wing were demolished in 1817. The church became the parish church of Eibingen in 1831 which had been dedicated to John the Baptist.

The parish belongs now to the Rheingauer Dom in Geisenheim.

=== New church ===
After a fire destroyed the church on 3 September 1932, it was not restored, but a new church built designed by Hans Rummel and Christoph Rummel trying to use elements of the style of the former monastery church. It was dedicated in 1935.

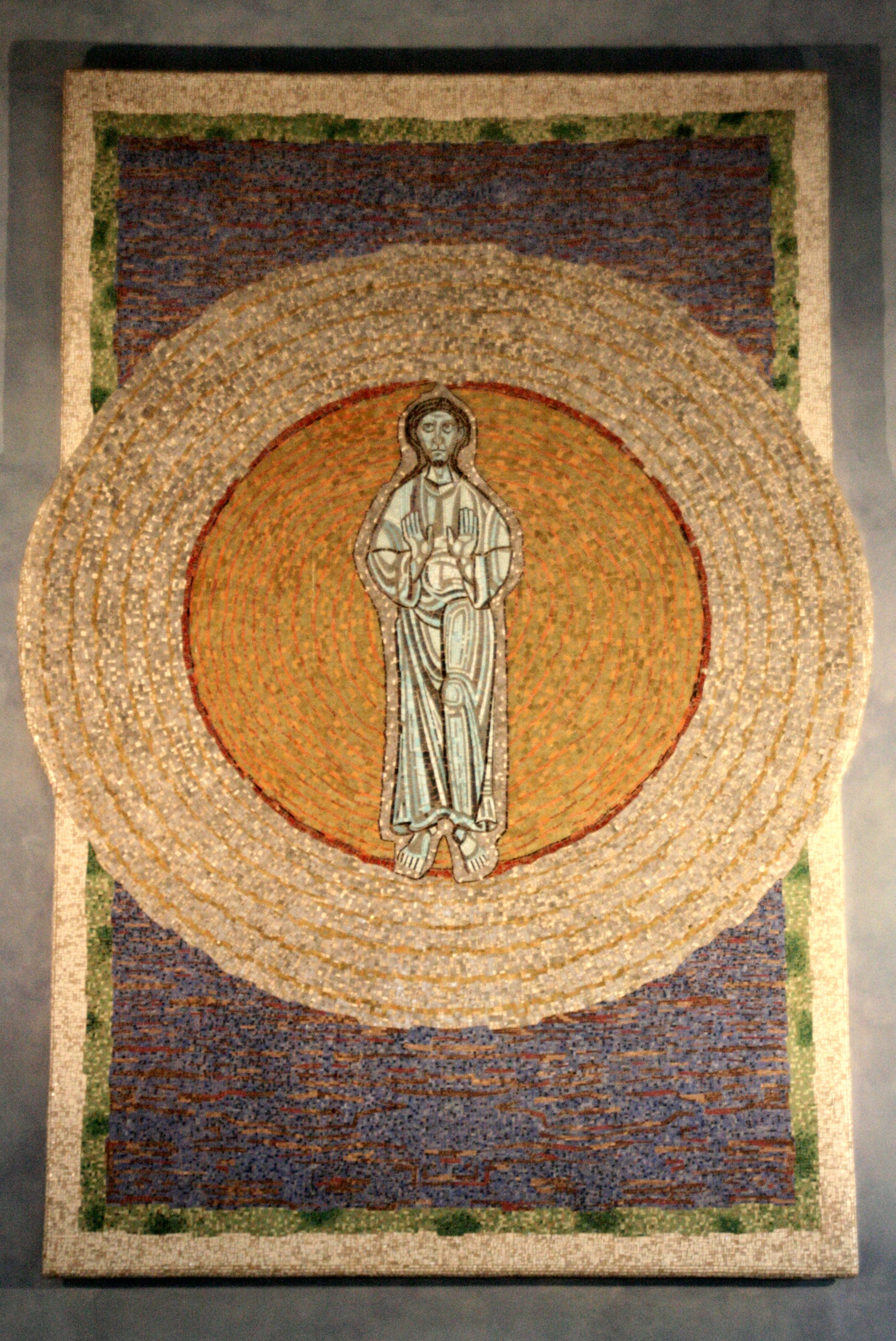
Altar mosaic

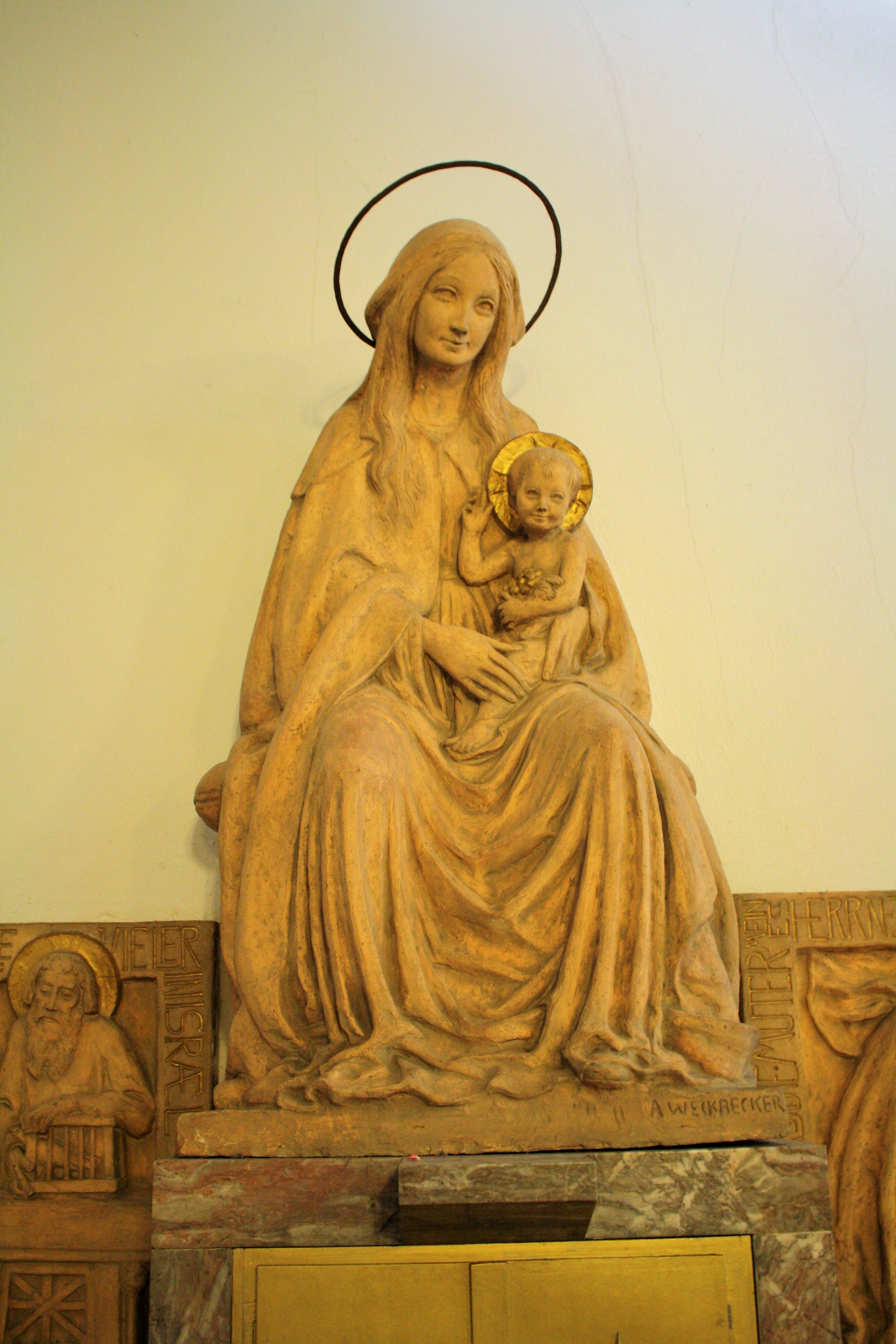
Maria with Christ child and grape

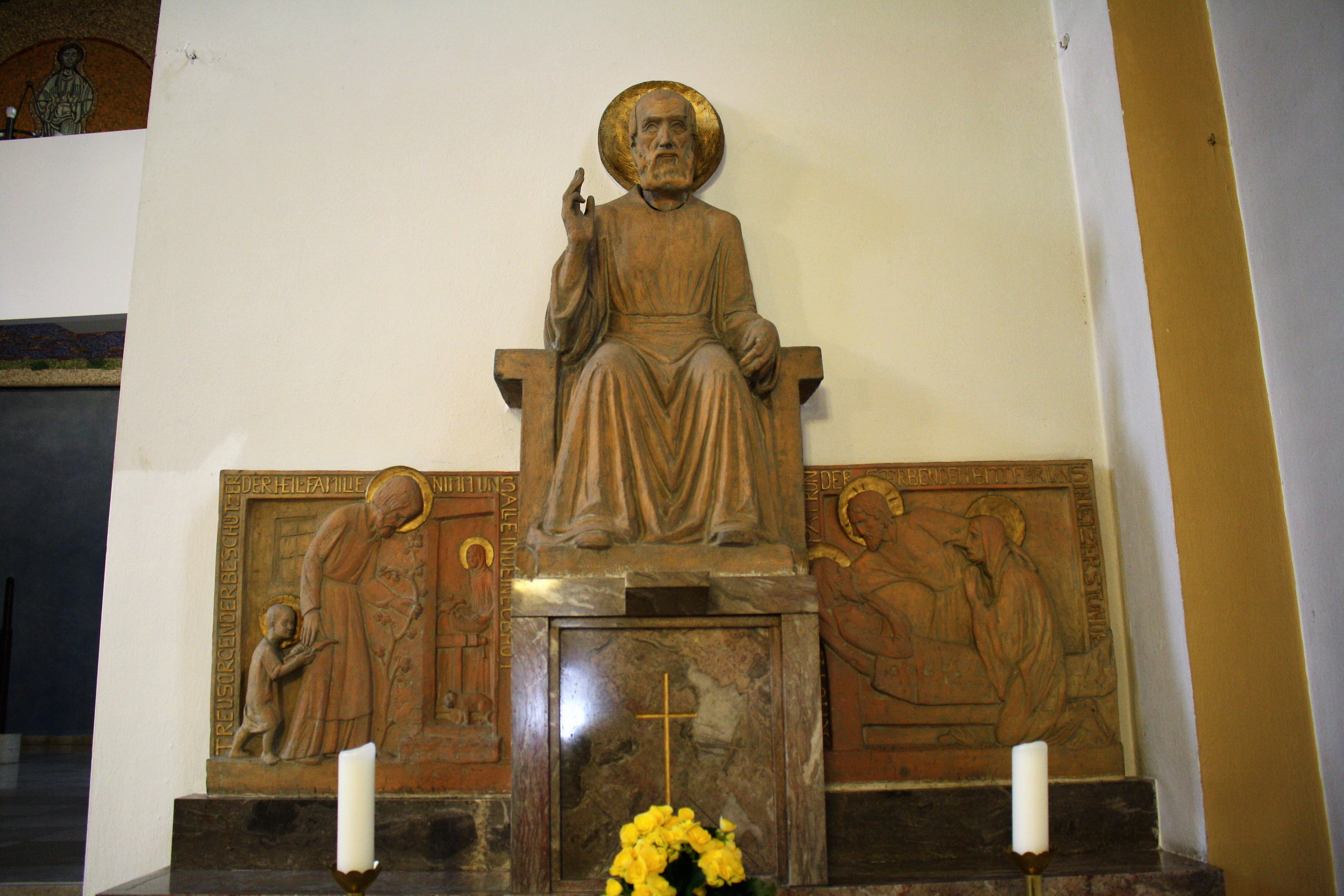
St. Josef's altar

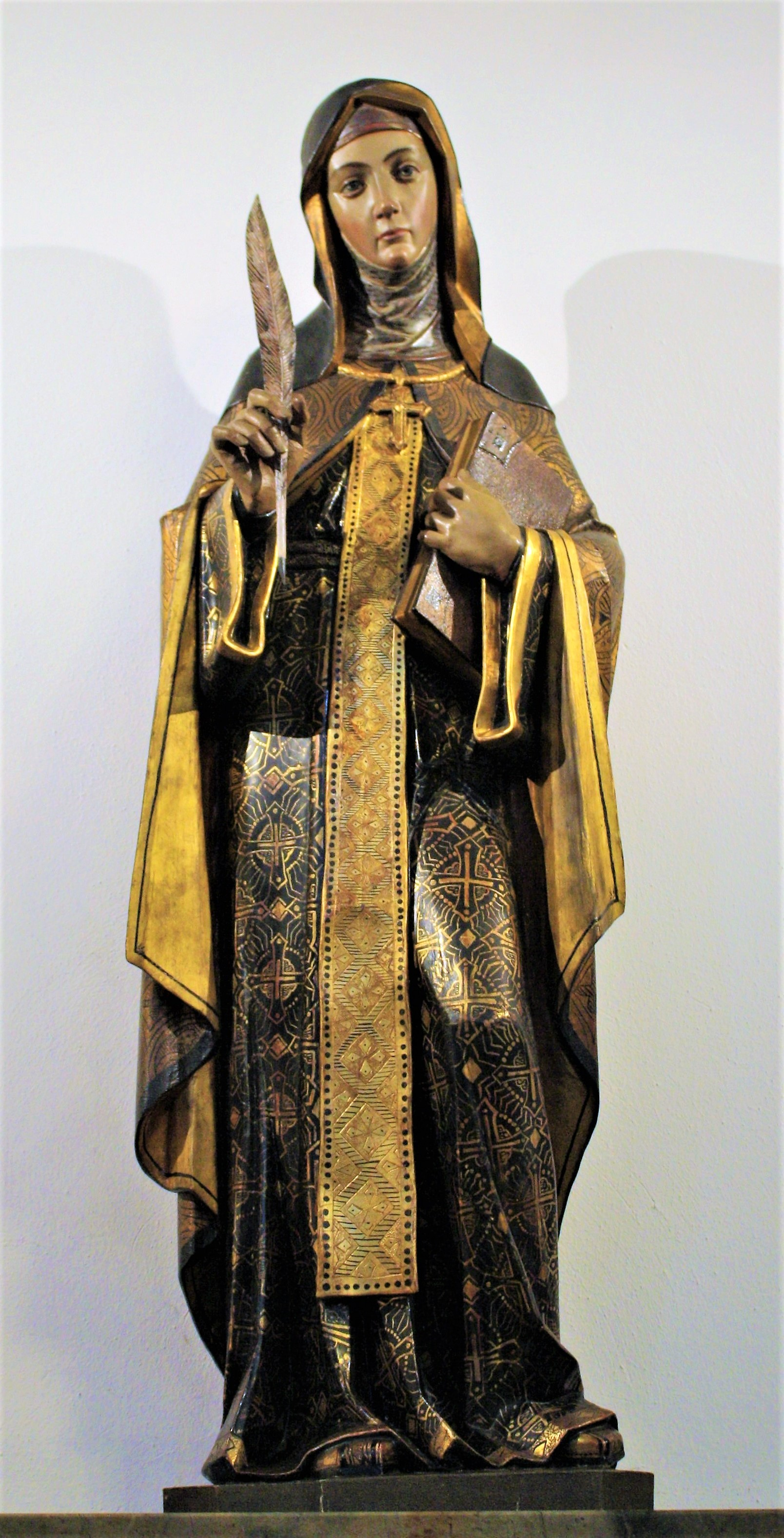
St. Hildegard

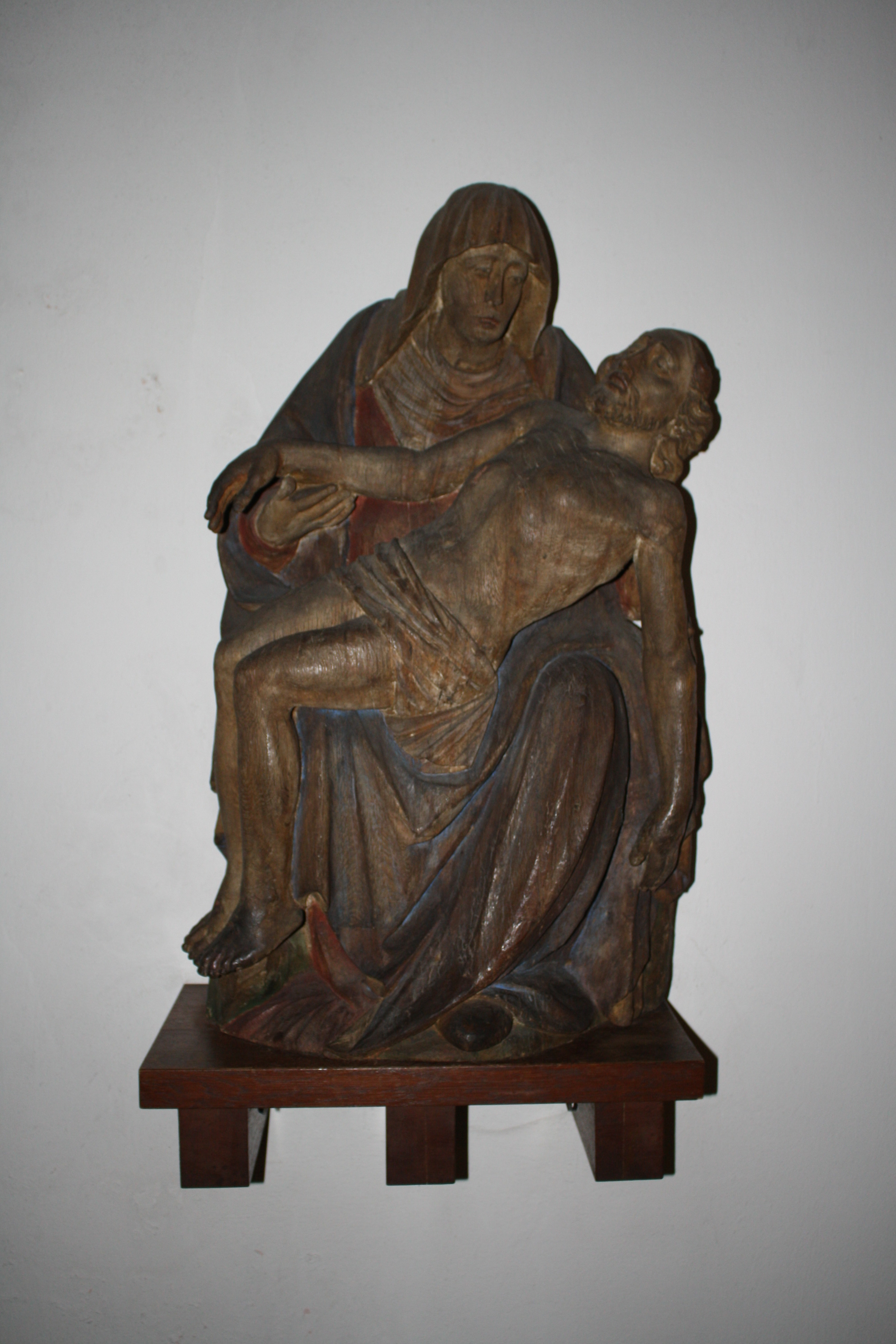
Pietà

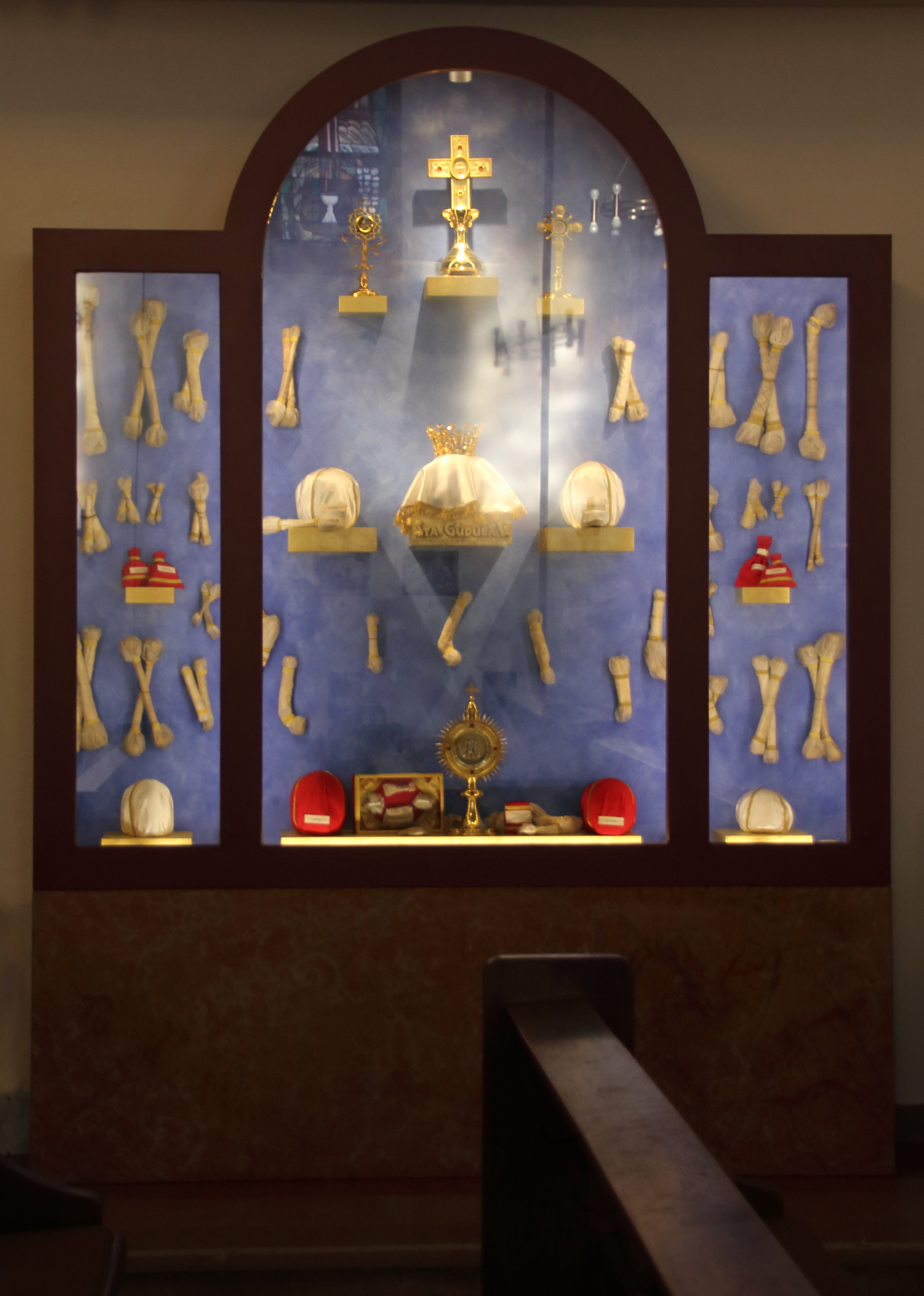
Relic treasure
