= Clavis Patrum Graecorum =

The Clavis Patrum Graecorum ('Key (Glossary) of the Greek Fathers') is a series of volumes published by Brepols of Turnhout in Belgium. The series aims to contain a list of all the Fathers of the Church who wrote in Greek from the 1st to the 8th centuries. For each author it lists all their works, whether genuine or not, extant or not. Each work is assigned a number. The CPG number is widely used as a reference in scholarly literature. The text itself is written in Latin.

A corresponding Clavis Patrum Latinorum also exists for the Latin Fathers.

The two were created in order to facilitate publishing the Corpus Christianorum series of Latin and Greek texts.

== Volumes ==
Maurice Geerard, Clavis patrum graecorum: qua optimae quaeque scriptorum patrum graecorum recensiones a primaevis saeculis usque ad octavum commode recluduntur, Turnhout: Brepols, 1974–2003:

- vol. 1: Patres antenicaeni, schedulis usi quibus rem paravit F. Winkelmann, 1983 (nos. 1000 to 1925)
- vol. 2: Ab Athanasio ad Chrysostomum, 1974 (nos. 2000 to 5197)
- vol. 3: Ab Cyrillo Alexandrino ad Iohannem Damascenum, 1979 (nos. 5200 to 8240)
- vol. 3 A: Ab Cyrillo Alexandrino ad Iohannem Damascenum: addenda volumini III, a Jacques Noret parata, 2003
- vol. 4: Concilia: catenae, 1980 (nos. starting at 9000)
- vol. 5: Indices, initia, concordantiae, cura et studio M. Geerard et F. Glorie, 1987
- (vol. 6): Supplementum, cura et studio M. Geerard et J. Noret, 1998
