= Columba Aspexit =

Sequence written by Hildegard of Bingen

Columba Aspexit is a sequence written by Hildegard of Bingen in the late 12th century. It is one of seven sequences from her collection of lyrical poetry entitled Symphonia armonie celestium revelationum. This piece is found in only one manuscript: HS 2; Hessische Landesbibliotek, Wiesbaden, "Riesenkodex" (1175).

A sequence is a dramatic poem that is sung between the Alleluia and the Gospel in the Mass. While most sequences have rhymed pairs of lines, Hildegard's are more through-composed. Columba Aspexit was written about St. Maximinus, whose feast is celebrated on 29 May. The date which it written is between 1175 and the 1180s.

== Recordings ==
- Von Bingen, Hildegard. Columba Aspexit, sequence for Maximinus. Hildegard von Bingen: O Nobilissima Viriditas. Catherine Schroeder, voice. Media 7, W79931, CD, 1996.
- Von Bingen, Hildegard. Columba Aspexit. A Feather on the Breath of God. Christopher Page, conductor. Gothic Voices, 020BD512, CD, 2006.
