= Corpus Christianorum =

Book series for ancient Christian texts

The Corpus Christianorum (CC) is a major publishing undertaking of the Belgian publisher Brepols Publishers devoted to patristic and medieval Latin texts.

The principal series are the Series Graeca (CCSG), Series Latina (CCSL), and the Continuatio Mediævalis (CCCM). There is also a smaller section, the Series Apocryphorum (CCSA), devoted to Apocryphal works, and a collection of autographs, the Autographa Medii Ævi (CCAMA). The series Conciliorum Oecumenicorum Generaliumque Decreta (COGD) contains confessional documents from Churches and Ecumenical organisations in the World with start in Nicæa 325 until today. The principal series are seen as successors to Migne's Patrologiae.

In 1947 Dom Eligius Dekkers, O.S.B. of the Sint-Pietersabdij in Steenbrugge, drew up a plan for editing afresh early Christian texts. His intention was to produce in a short timespan a "Corpus Christianorum", comprising new editions of the writings of Christian authors from Tertullian through to the Venerable Bede. Although some critics thought the project to be impracticable, Dom Eligius found support from the outset in Brepols Publishers from Turnhout. Collaboration started in 1951 with the publication of a highly valued and essential tool, the Clavis Patrum Latinorum, which paved the way for the future success of the series, and later the Clavis Patrum Graecorum. New editions followed from 1953 on and ever since Corpus Christianorum has continued to flourish. New series within Corpus Christianorum have been established and new volumes were ever more regularly published. Although in the early years the modus laborandi relied on updating existing editions, this was soon replaced by the preparation of entirely new critical editions. This demanding ambition required increasing supervision and, together with the establishment of new Corpus-related initiatives, it has been necessary to establish new academic partnerships, comprising leading scholars and academic centres, to supervise every single Corpus series.
