= Hildegard of Bingen discography =

This is a discography of Hildegard of Bingen's musical works.

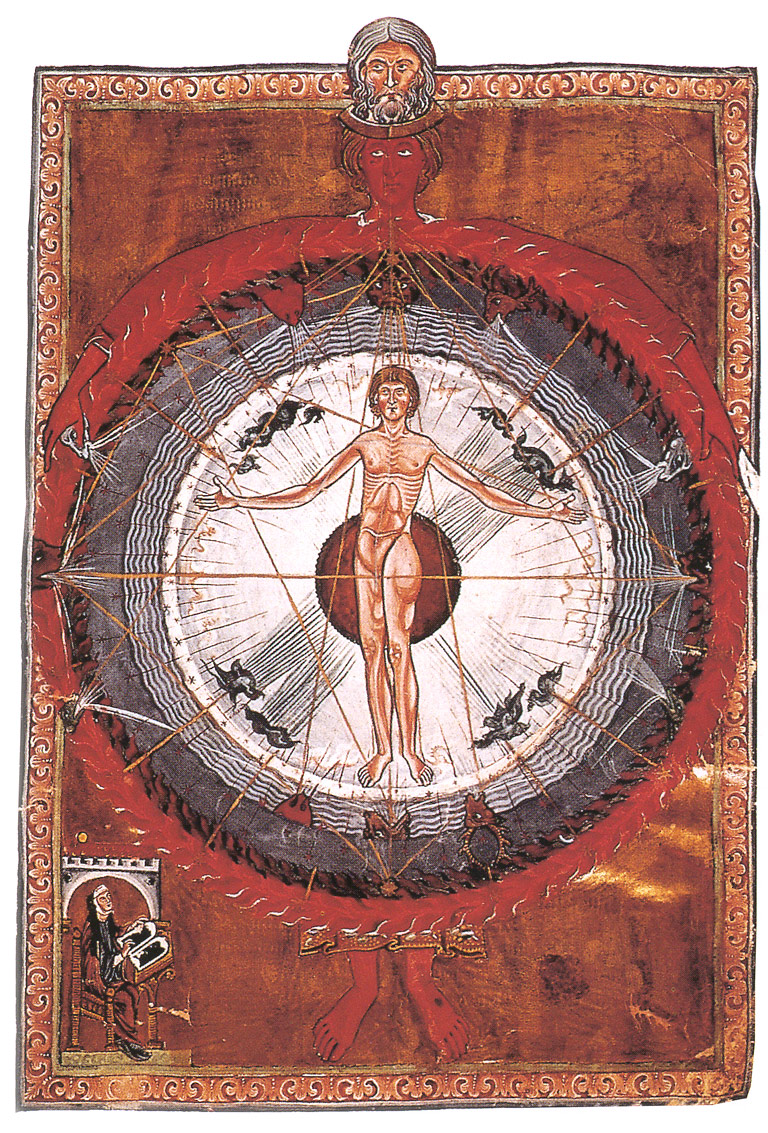
"Universal Man", illumination from Hildegard's Liber divinorum operum, 1165

- Gesänge der hl. Hildegard von Bingen. Schola der Benediktinerinnenabtei St. Hildegard, dir. M.-I. Ritscher. Bayer 100116, 1979.
- A Feather on the Breath of God: Sequences and Hymns by Abbess Hildegard of Bingen. Gothic Voices, dir. Christopher Page, Emma Kirkby (soprano). Hyperion CDA66039, 1981.
- Ordo virtutum. Sequentia, dir. Barbara Thornton. 2 disks. Deutsche Harmonia mundi 77051-2-RG, 1982.
- Symphoniae: Geistliche Gesänge/Spiritual Songs. Sequentia, dir. Barbara Thornton. Deutsche Harmonia mundi 770230-2-RG/RCA 77020, 1983.
- Hildegard von Bingen und ihre Zeit: Geistliche Musik des 12. Ensemble für frühe Musik Augsburg, Christophorus 74584, 1990.
- The Lauds of St. Ursula. Early Music Institute, dir. Thomas Binkley. Focus 911, 1991.
- Jouissance. Viriditas, dir. Juliette Hughes. Spectrum/Cistercian Publications, ISBN 0-86786-344-7, 1993.
- The Emma Kirkby Collection. Christopher Page, Hyperion 66227, 1993.
- Hildegard von Bingen: Canticles of Ecstasy. Sequentia, dir. Barbara Thornton. Deutsche Harmonia mundi 05472-77320-2, 1994.
- Hildegard von Bingen: Heavenly Revelations. Oxford Camerata, dir. Jeremy Summerly. Naxos 8.550998, 1994.
- Vision: The Music of Hildegard von Bingen. Richard Souther, Emily Van Evera, Sister Germaine Fritz, Catherine King. Angel Records 1994
- Voice of the Blood. Sequentia, dir. Barbara Thornton. 2 discs. Deutsche Harmonia mundi 05472-77346-2, 1995.
- O nobilissima viriditas. Catherine Schroeder, et al. Champeaux CSM 0006, 1995.
- Ordo Virtutum. Vox Animae, dir. Michael Fields. Etcetera Record Company BV CD KTC 1203, 1995.
- Monk and the Abbess: Music of Hildegard von Bingen and Meredith Monk. Musica Sacra, dir. Richard Westenburg, Catalyst 09026-68329-2, 1996.
- Symphony of the Harmony of Celestial Revelations. Sinfonye, dir. Stevie Wishart. Vol. 1. Celestial Harmonies 13127-2, 1996.
- Hildegard of Bingen: The Harmony of Heaven. Ellen Oak, Bison Publications 1, 1996.
- Hildegard von Bingen: O Jerusalem. Sequentia. Deutsche Harmonia Mundi 05472 77353 2, 1997.
- 11,000 Virgins: Chants for the Feast of St. Ursula. Anonymous 4, Harmonia Mundi 907200, 1997.
- Aurora. Sinfonye, dir. Stevie Wishart. Vol. 2. Celestial Harmonies 13128, 1997.
- Unfurling Love’s Creation: Chants by Hildegard von Bingen. Norma Gentile. Lyrichord Early Music Series (LEMS) 8027, 1997.
- Ordo virtutum. Sequentia, dir. Barbara Thornton. 2 discs. Deutsche Harmonia mundi 05472 77394 2, 1997.
- Hildegard von Bingen: Saints. Sequentia. 2 discs. Deutsche Harmonia Mundi 05472 77378 2, 1998.
- Hildegard of Bingen: Choral Music (Angelic Voices - Heavenly Music From A Medieval Abbey). Richard Vendome et al. The Gift of Music, 1998.
- Lux Vivens (Living Light). Jocelyn Montgomery with David Lynch. Mammoth Records, 1998.
- 900 Years: Hildegard von Bingen. Sequentia. Box Set (8 discs), contains: Symphoniae, Canticles of ecstasy, Voice of the Blood, O Jerusalem, Saints (2 discs), Ordo virtutum (1997 recording, 2 discs). RCA 77505, 1998.
- Hildegard von Bingen: Hildegard von Bingen. Garmarna. Music Network Records Group AB, MNWCD 365, 2001.
- Healing Chants by Hildegard of Bingen. Norma Gentile. Healing Chants, 2002.
- Hildegard von Bingen In Portrait. (incl. Ordo Virtutum Vox Animae, dir. Michael Fields). Includes Hildegard, dramatised BBC documentary starring Patricia Routledge; A Real Mystic, interview and lecture with Professor Michael Fox; A Source of Inspiration, Washington National Cathedral documentary on her life and times; Illuminations, art gallery of her mystic visions with comments by Professor Michael Fox. Double DVD BBC/Opus Arte OA 0874 D, 2003.
- O nobilissima viriditas. Sinfonye, dir. Stevie Wishart. Vol. 3. Celestial Harmonies 13129, 2004.
- O viridissima virga. ensemble amarcord, on "Nun komm, der Heiden Heiland" Raumklang 2005
- The Origin of Fire: Music and Visions of Hildegard von Bingen. Anonymous 4, Harmonia Mundi 907327, 2005.
- Meditation Chants of Hildegard Von Bingen. Norma Gentile. Healing Chants, 2008.
- Electric Ordo Virtutum. Hildegurls. Innova Recordings, 2009.
- Visions of Paradise – A Hildegard von Bingen Anthology. Sequentia. Deutsche Harmonia Mundi/Sony Classics, 2009
- Der Ozean im Fingerhut. Hildegard von Bingen, Mechthild von Magdeburg, Hadewijch und Etty Hillesum im Gespräch. Hörspiel von Hildegard Elisabeth Keller. 2 Audio-CDs. VDF-Verlag 2011.
- O Orzchis Ecclesia - Ad Matutinum in I Nocturno, Symphonia harmoniae caelestium revelationum, Liber divinorum operum, Federico Bardazzi, Ensemble San Felice, Brlliant Classics, 2011
- Hildegard von Bingen – Du aber sei ohne Angst. Ensemble Cosmedin. Zweitausendeins Edition, 2012.
- Hildegard von Bingen – Inspiration. Ensemble VocaMe, dir. Michael Popp. Berlin Classics 2012.
- Hildegard von Bingen: Celestial Hierarchy. Sequentia, dir. Benjamin Bagby. Deutsche Harmonia Mundi (Sony) 2013
- Hildegard: Vespers for Hildegard. Stevie Wishart, performed by Sinfonye with Guy Sigsworth, produced by Stevie Wishart & Guy Sigsworth, Decca, 2012
