= Barbara Stühlmeyer =

German theologian, musicologist and author (born 1964)

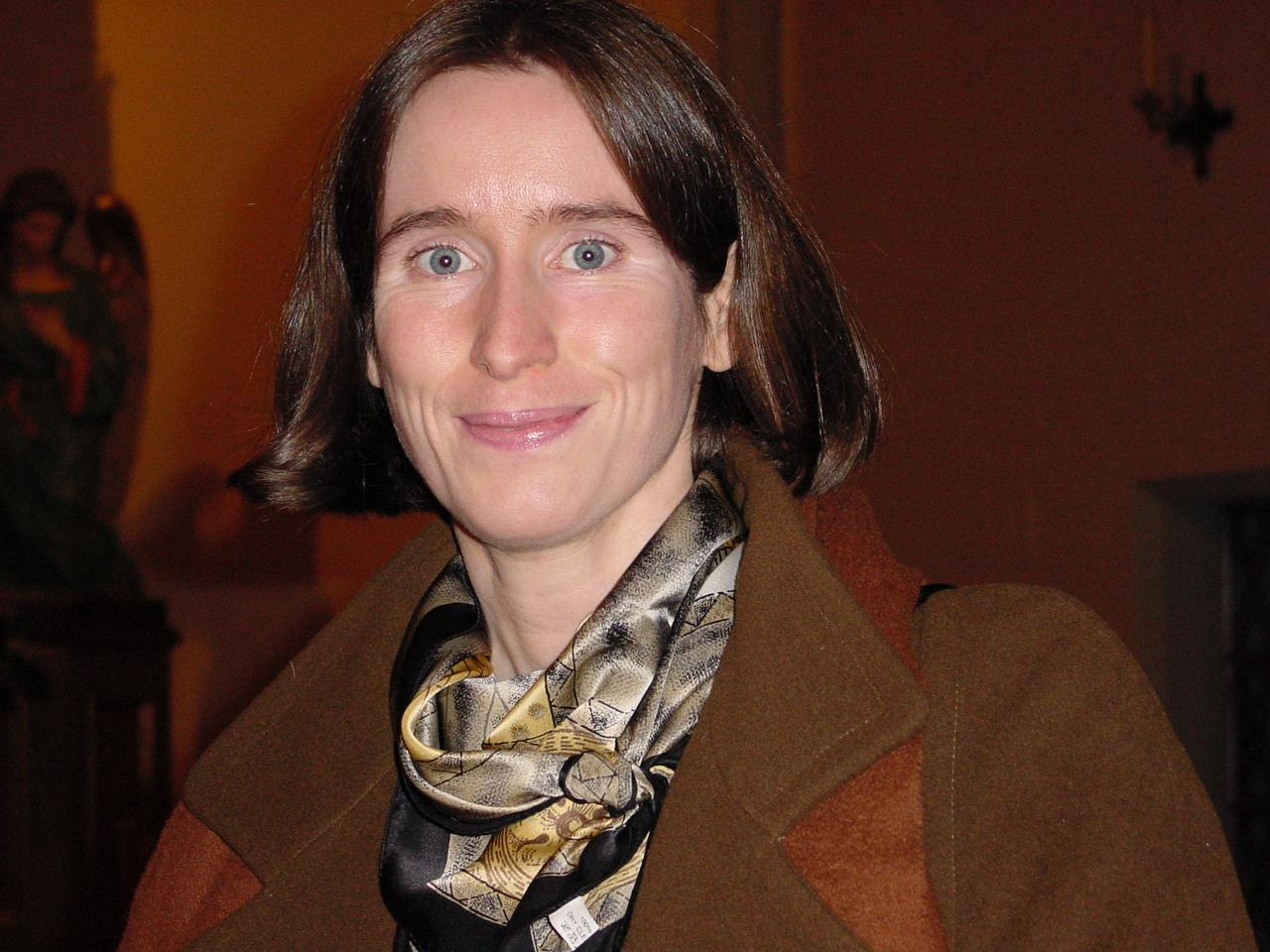
- Stühlmeyer in July 2011
- Born: 12 November 1964 (age 61); Bremen, Germany
- Education: University of the Arts Bremen; University of Münster
- Occupations: Theologian; Musicologist; Church musician; Writer
- Title: Doctor of Philosophy
- Spouse: Ludger Stühlmeyer

Barbara Stühlmeyer OblOSB (born 12 November 1964) is a German theologian, musicologist, and free-lance author, known especially for her work on the music of Hildegard of Bingen.

== Biography ==
Stühlmeyer was born in Bremen. After completing her A levels at the Altes Gymnasium in Bremen and her organ studies with church music director Winfrid Langosz, whom she assisted at the Catholic Provost church St. John's Bremen, she studied Christian music at the University of the Arts Bremen (Diploma 1988). From 1988 to 1994 she studied Catholic theology with Arnold Angenendt and Klemens Richter, philosophy with Berthold Wald and musicology with Axel Beer and Winfried Schepporst at the University of Münster. In 2004 she graduated summa cum laude from the University of Münster with a doctorate of philosophy. Additionally, she studied Gregorian semiology with Luigi Agustoni, Godehard Joppich and Johannes Berchmans Göschl.

Her doctoral dissertation Die Gesänge von Hildegard von Bingen became a standard work of music-related Hildegard research. For the first time, it proves that the diastematic Neume script (written on staves) is of rhythmical significance. Prior to this, Hildegard's compositions had been interpreted equalistically or mensuralistically. Stühlmeyer demonstrated that Hildegard's tone language and the ambitus, spanning up to two octaves, both meet professional, compositional standards of the 12th century. Her scholarly work proved that the parameters of the Regula Benedicti influenced Hildegard's formal concept of composition. Stühlmeyer was also able to show that Hildegard's songs were used in liturgical services. Her theological research of the Ordo virtutum illustrated that Hildegard mirrors here the ethical discourse of the 12th century with its protagonists Petrus Abaelardus, Anselm of Canterbury and Rupert of Deutz. For the research project 'Music and Gender on the Internet', headed by prof. Beatrix Bochard, she wrote the entry about Hildegard's music.

From 1993 to 2001, Stühlmeyer hosted conferences and workshops at the Catholic academy St.-Jabobus-Haus in Goslar. Since 1995 she has been serving as a contributor and editor of the journal Karfunkel, where she is responsible for the categories music and medievalism. Since 2005 she has regularly written for various journals and magazines on a free-lance basis. Between 2010 and 2015, she also served as editor of the scholarly journal Musica sacra, published by Bärenreiter Verlag. As a scholarly consultant, she assists with CD productions, e.g. of the ensembles Sequentia and Benjamin Bagby, Ars Choralis Coeln with Maria Jonas, and Cosmedian, Stuttgart with Stephanie and Christoph Haas. For radio and television as well as international exhibitions, she works as an expert on the Middle Ages. She is involved in numerous book publications.

Stühlmeyer lives in Hof in Bavaria and is married to cantor and composer Ludger Stühlmeyer; they have one daughter, Lea Stühlmeyer. Since 2002 she has been an oblate of the Benedictine abbey St. Hildegard's in Rüdesheim am Rhein.

== Honours ==
- In 2019 she was awarded the Certificate of Honour of the Roman Catholic Archdiocese of Bamberg.

== Publications ==
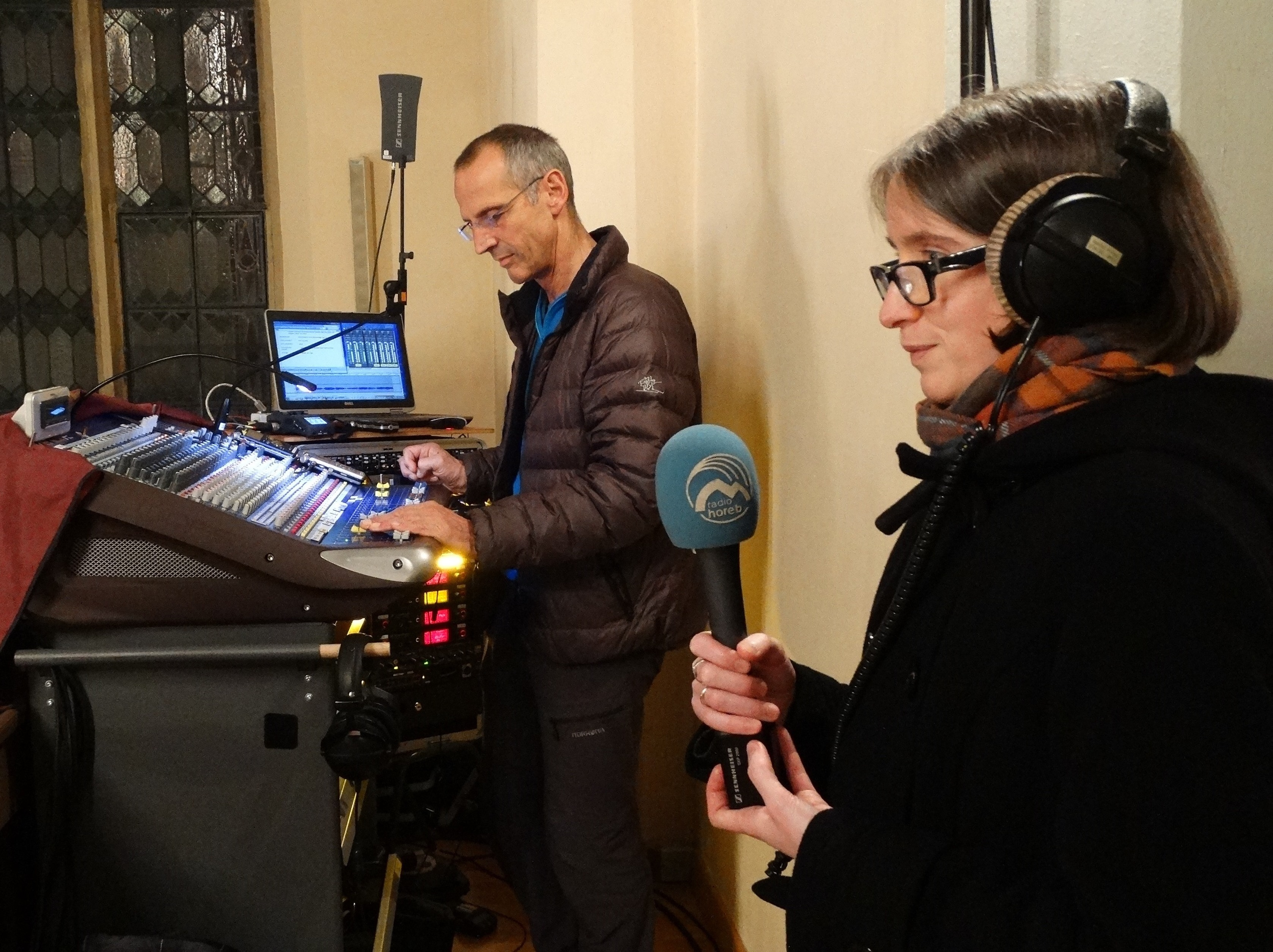
Program with Barbara Stühlmeyer 2013

=== Books ===
- Die Gesänge der Hildegard von Bingen : Eine musikologische, theologische und kulturhistorische Untersuchung. Olms, Hildesheim 2003, ISBN 3-487-11845-9.
- In einem Meer von Licht : Heilende Gesänge der Hildegard von Bingen. Illustrated by Sabine Böhm. Butzon & Bercker, Kevelaer 2004, ISBN 3-7666-0593-3.
- Neue Freunde sind was Tolles. Illustrated by Nadine Lentzen. Verlag Haus Altenberg, Düsseldorf 2010, ISBN 978-3-7761-0224-6 and Verlag Butzon & Bercker, Kevelaer 2011, ISBN 978-3-7666-1429-2.
- Das Leben singen. Together with Ludger Stühlmeyer. Verlag DeBehr, Radeberg 2011, ISBN 978-3-939241-24-9.
- Engel – die andere Wirklichkeit. Illustrated by Sabine Böhm. Verlag DeBehr, Radeberg 2011, ISBN 978-3-939241-47-8.
- Hildegard von Bingen : Werke Band IV. Lieder Symphoniae. Beuroner Kunstverlag 2012. ISBN 978-3-87071-263-1.
- Tugenden und Laster : Wegweisung im Dialog mit Hildegard von Bingen. Illustrated by Sabine Böhm. Beuroner Kunstverlag 2012. ISBN 978-3-87071-287-7.
- Be-Stimmung : Unterwegs zur Stimme und zu sich selbst. Together with Gottfried Hoffmann. Verlag DeBehr, Radeberg 2012, ISBN 978-3-94402-802-6.
- Die Geheimschrift : Mit Hildegard von Bingen auf Spurensuche (Crime novel for children). Verlag Haus Altenberg, ISBN 978-3-77610-274-1 and Butzon & Bercker, ISBN 978-3-76661-658-6 Düsseldorf/Kevelaer 2013.
- Bernhard Lichtenberg : Ich werde meinem Gewissen folgen. Together with Ludger Stühlmeyer. Topos plus Verlagsgemeinschaft, Kevelaer 2013, ISBN 978-3-836708-35-7. Sponsored by the Wolfgang-Siegel-Stiftung.
- Wege in sein Licht : Eine spirituelle Biografie über Hildegard von Bingen. Beuroner Kunstverlag, Beuron 2013, ISBN 978-3-870712-93-8.
- Hildegard von Bingen : Leben – Werk – Verehrung. Topos plus Verlagsgemeinschaft, Kevelaer 2014, ISBN 978-3-8367-0868-5.
- Johann Valentin Rathgeber : Leben und Werk. Verlag Sankt Michaelsbund, München 2016, ISBN 978-3-943135-78-7.
- Heilende Lebenskräfte. Wege zu einem freieren Leben. Beuroner Kunstverlag 2017, ISBN 978-3-87071-354-6.
- Elisabeth von Thüringen : Spiritualität – Geschichte – Wirkung. Topos Plus Verlagsgemeinschaft, Kevelaer 2018, ISBN 978-3-8367-1125-8.
- Das Turiner Grabtuch : Faszination und Fakten. Together with Archbishop Karl Braun, Butzon & Bercker Kevelaer 2018, ISBN 978-3-7666-2534-2.
- Pendel, Steine, Nervenkekse : Esoterik im Gespräch mit Hildegard von Bingen. Together with Archbishop Karl Braun, Butzon & Bercker, Kevelaer 2019, ISBN 978-3-7666-2601-1.
- Auf Christus getauft : Glauben leben und verkünden im 21. Jahrhundert. Butzon & Bercker, Kevelaer 2019, ISBN 978-3-7666-2488-8.
- Kaleidoskop der umarmenden Liebe : Zugänge zur Erfahrung des Umfangenseins von Christus. Regensburger philosophisch-theologische Schriften, Friedrich Pustet Verlag, Regensburg 2021, ISBN 978-37917-3254-1.
- Make Your own day : with your own ideas. Norderstedt 2021, ISBN 978-3-7543-0659-8.
- Lebendiges Licht: Die Engel als Wegweiser zum Sinn in der Schau Hildegards von Bingen. Verlagsbuchhandlung Sabat, Kulmbach 2021, ISBN 978-3-943506-93-8.
- Lichtwege : Aphorismen im Kirchenjahr. Verlagsbuchhandlung Sabat, Kulmbach 2021, ISBN 978-3-943506-95-2.

=== Contributions in book publications (selection) ===
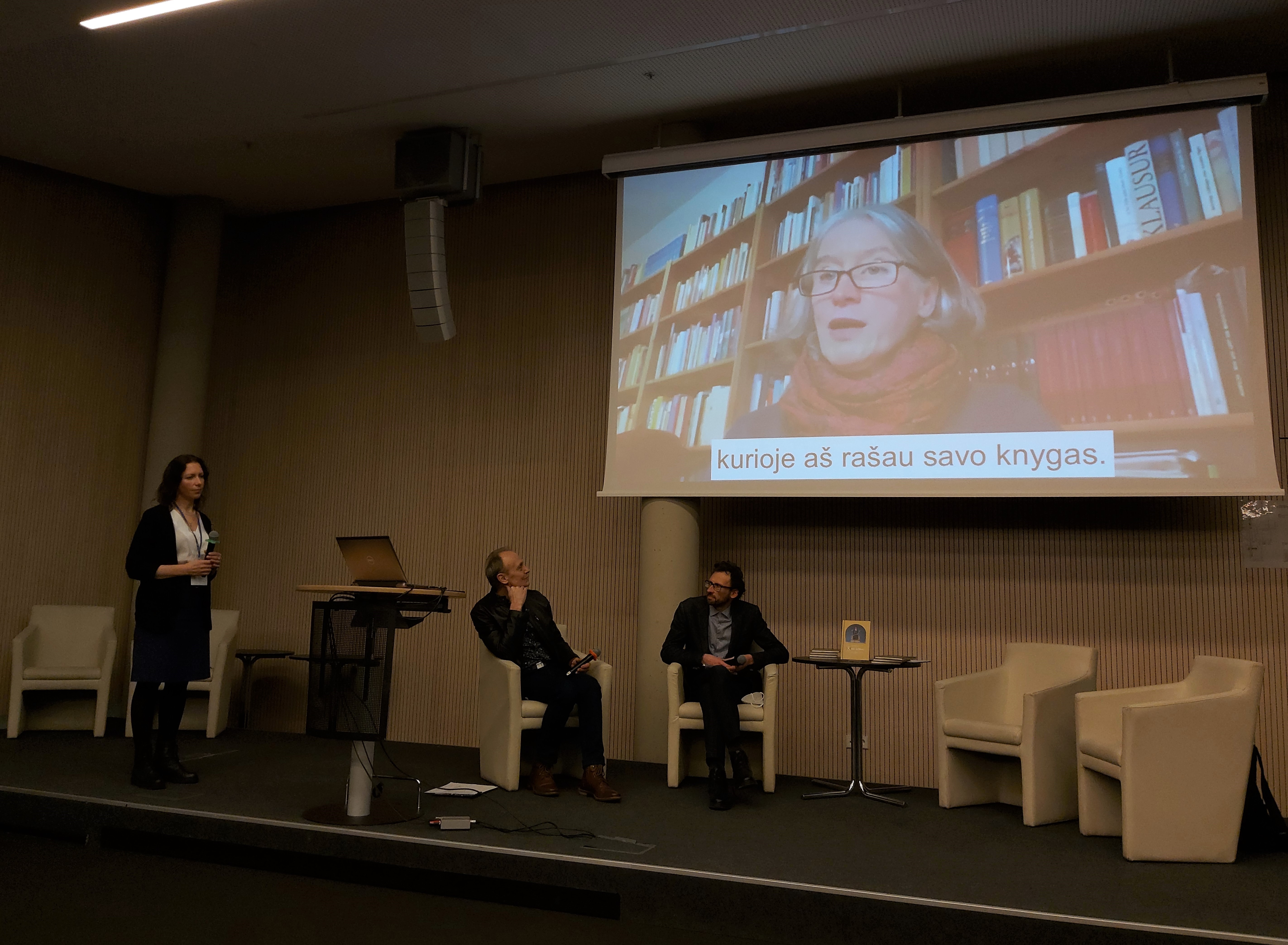
Barbara Stühlmeyer at the Baltic book fair in Vilnius, February 2022

- Die Kompositionen der Hildegard von Bingen : Ein Forschungsbericht. In: Beiträge zur Gregorianik. 22. ConBrio Verlagsgesellschaft, Regensburg 1996, ISBN 3-930079-23-2. p. 74–85.
- Auf der Suche nach der Stimme des lebendigen Geistes : Die Musik Hildegards von Bingen als Sinnbild vollendeter Schöpfung. In: Edeltraut Forster (editor): Hildegard von Bingen : Prophetin durch die Zeiten. Herder, Freiburg im Breisgau 1997, ISBN 3-451-26162-6, p. 334–339.
- Musik im 12. Jahrhundert. In: Hans-Jürgen Kotzur: Hildegard von Bingen 1098 – 1179. Verlag Philipp von Zabern, Mainz 1998, ISBN 3-8053-2445-6, p. 178–181.
- Musik in Kirchen und Klöstern. In: Jahrbuch der Erzdiözese Bamberg 2006. Heinrichs-Verlag Bamberg 2005, p. 33–37.
- Die Chöre der Engel und der Teufel im Chorgestühl – die Grundlagen der mittelalterlichen Musikpraxis. In: Ludger Stühlmeyer (editor): Stationen der Kirchenmusik im Erzbistum Bamberg. Bamberg 2007.
- Die Seele klingt wie ein Lied – Hildegard von Bingen und die Musik. In: Information und Material. Hildegard von Bingen – Theologische, didaktische und spirituelle Impulse. Institut für Religionspädagogik Freiburg, 2012 no. 4055, p. 29–32.
- Eine historisch-phänomenologische Landkarte zum Amplexus. In: Joachim Werz (editor): Die Lebenswelt der Zisterzienser. Neue Studien zur Geschichte eines europäischen Ordens. Aschendorff Verlag, Münster 2020, ISBN 978-3-7954-3471-7, p. 230–242.
- Gottesrede: Ermutigende Orientierung in Krisenzeiten bei Hildegard von Bingen. Pilgern im Todesschatten, die Klage der Elemente und Aufblick zum Licht oder: sci vias lucis in statu deficienti, in: Joachim Werz (editor): Gottesrede in Epidemien. Theologie und Kirche in der Krise. Aschendorff Verlag, Münster 2021, ISBN 978-3-402-24722-8.

=== Newspaper articles ===
- Series about Hildegard of Bingen (2011): Stark und Gottverliebt (18 September), Von der Eremitin zum Superstar (Oktober 23), Klartext geredet, trotzdem gefragt (Oktober 30), Von Dinkelbrei und Chalzedon (6 November), Einmal Himmel und zurück (13 November), Gut und Böse im Gespräch (20 November), Gotteslob aus Frauenhand (27 November). In: church magazine from Austria.
- Mythos, Logos, Therapie. In: Die Tagespost, Oktober 14, 2015.
- An interview with Philip Carr-Gomm. In: Karfunkel 120, 2015.
- Wegschauen geht nicht. An interview with Günter Wallraff for his 75th birthday. In: Die Tagespost, 30 September 2017, p. 10.

=== Lyrics for musical works ===
- Text for the song Glaubend leben im Alltag on the occasion of the 1000th anniversary of the Roman Catholic Archdiocese of Bamberg. First performance: 2007. In: Kirchenmusik im Erzbistum Bamberg, no. 44, Juli 2007 p. 11 und Heinrichsblatt, no. 31, Bamberg, August 2007.
- Libretto for opera Martin Luther by Bernfried E. G. Pröve, about the reformer Martin Luther. First performance: 2017 Germany.
- Text for the song Ein Lied für Elisabeth, in: Elisabeth von Thüringen. Topos Plus Verlagsgemeinschaft, Kevelaer 2018, ISBN 978-3-8367-1125-8.

== Discography ==
Scientific tutoring and booklet:

- Hildegard von Bingen : Femina Forma Maria. Marienlieder des Villarenser Kodex. Ensemble Mediatrix, conductor Johannes Berchmans Göschl. Calig, Augsburg 1996.
- Hildegard von Bingen : O vis aeternitatis. Vesper in der Abtei St. Hildegard. Schola der Benediktinnerinnenabtei St. Hildegard, Eibingen, conductor Johannes Berchmans Göschl, Sr. Christiane Rath OSB. Ars Musici, Freiburg 1997.
- Hildegard von Bingen : Saints. Ensemble Sequentia, Barbara Thornton and Benjamin Bagby. BMG 1998.
- Hildegard von Bingen : Ordo virtutum – ein mittelalterliches Mysterienspiel. Ensemble A Cappella, Köln, conductor Dirk van Betteray. OKK, Waldbröl 1998.
- Hildegard von Bingen : Ordo virtutum. Cantoria Alberto Grau, conductor Johannes Berchmans Göschl. Legato 1999.
- Lilium. Ensemble Cosmedin, Stephanie and Christoph Haas. Animato 2001.
- Seraphim : Hildegard von Bingen. Ensemble Cosmedin, Stephanie and Christoph Haas. Animato 2005.
- Rose van Jhericho : Das Liederbuch der Anna von Köln (um 1500). Ars Choralis Coeln, conductor Maria Jonas. Raumklang 2007.
- Quinta Essentia. Ensemble Cosmedin, Stephanie and Christoph Haas. Animato 2007.
- Ein Hofer Königspaar : Die Orgeln in St. Marien und St. Michaelis. Rondeau Production, Leipzig 2012.
- Hildegard von Bingen : Celestial Hierarchy. Sequentia, conductor Benjamin Bagby, German Harmonia Mundi (Sony) 2013.
- Anima : Sakrale Musik aus der Fülle der Zeiten. Ensemble Cosmedin, Stephanie and Christoph Haas. Eos 2020.

== Sources ==
- Beckers-Dohlen, Claudia: Karfunkel-Autoren im Porträt: Dr. Barbara Stühlmeyer. In: Karfunkel, no. 96, Oktober 2011, p. 63.
- Franz, Beate: Leben wie der heilige Benedikt. Portrait about the Benediktineroblate Dr. Barbara Stühlmeyer. In: Frankenpost. Hof, 23 Dezember 2012, p. 2.
- Hanel, Franziska: Lieder und Bilder – Hildegard von Bingen als zentraler Punkt im Leben zweier Frauen: Barbara Stühlmeyer und Sabine Böhm. In: Frankenpost. Hof, 18 September 2004.
- Stank, Hanna: Gemeindeleben als Abenteuer. In: Frankenpost. Hof, 9 November 2010.
- Weiler, Dorothea: Auf der Suche nach der Stimme des lebendigen Geistes : Barbara Stühlmeyer forscht über die Musik der Hildegard von Bingen. In: Heinrichsblatt, no. 16, Bamberg, 19 April 1998.
