= Canticles of Ecstasy =

Studio album by Sequentia
- Released: 1994
- Recorded: St. Pantaleon, Cologne, Germany, 16–21 June 1993
- Genre: Sacred vocal music; plainchant; early music
- Length: 72:53
- Label: Deutsche Harmonia Mundi
- Producer: Klaus L. Neumann

Sequentia chronology
Oswald von Wolkenstein: Songs (1993)	Canticles of Ecstasy (1994)	Voice of the Blood (1995)

Canticles of Ecstasy is an album of sacred vocal music written in the 12th century by the German abbess Hildegard of Bingen and recorded by the early music ensemble Sequentia that was released by the Deutsche Harmonia Mundi recording label in 1994.

The album is one of a series of recordings of the complete musical works of Hildegard by the early medieval music specialists and founders of Sequentia, Barbara Thornton and her husband Benjamin Bagby.

It was recorded between 16 and 21 June 1993 in the church of St. Pantaleon, Cologne, Germany, "at the sarcophagus of the Empress Theophanu" (d. 991).

The music is from a medieval manuscript written at Hildegard's abbey (Rupertsberger "Riesencodex" (1180–90) Wiesbaden: Hessische Landesbibliothek, MS 2) and the Latin texts are from Hildegard von Bingen, Lieder (Salzburg, 1969).

== Track listing ==
All vocal compositions (responses and antiphons) written by Hildegard of Bingen.

1. "O vis aeternitatis" (7:56)
2. "Nunc aperuit nobis" (1:53)
3. "Quia ergo femina mortem instruxit" (1:49)
4. "Cum processit factura digiti Dei" (6:32)
5. "Alma Redemptoris Mater" (2:10)
6. "Ave Maria, O auctrix vite" (8:57)
7. "Spiritus Sanctus vivificans vite" (2:15)
8. "O ignis spiritus Paracliti" (6:17)
9. "Caritas habundat in omnia" (2:10)
10. "O virga mediatrix" (2:25)
11. "O viridissima virga, Ave" (3:51)
12. Instrumental Piece (3:30)
13. "O Pastor Animarum" (1:18)
14. "O tu suavissima virga" (11:12)
15. "O choruscans stellarum" (2:37)
16. "O nobilissima viriditas" (6:42)

== Personnel ==
=== Musicians ===
- Barbara Thornton – voice, director
- Gundula Anders – voice
- Pamela Dellal – voice
- Elizabeth Glen – voice
- Heather Knutson – voice
- Laurie Monahan – voice
- Susanne Norin – voice
- Janet Youngdahl – voice
- Elizabeth Gaver – medieval fiddle, arranger
- Elisabetta de Mircovich – medieval fiddle
- Benjamin Bagby – medieval harp, arranger

=== Recording and production personnel ===
- Jan Hofermann – executive producer
- Klaus L. Neumann – producer
- Barbara Valentin – artistic recording supervisor
- Martin Andrae – technical recording supervisor
- Barbara Göbel – editing
- Jens Markowsky – final editing

== See also ==
- Ordo Virtutum
