= Stimmwerck =

German classical music vocal quartet

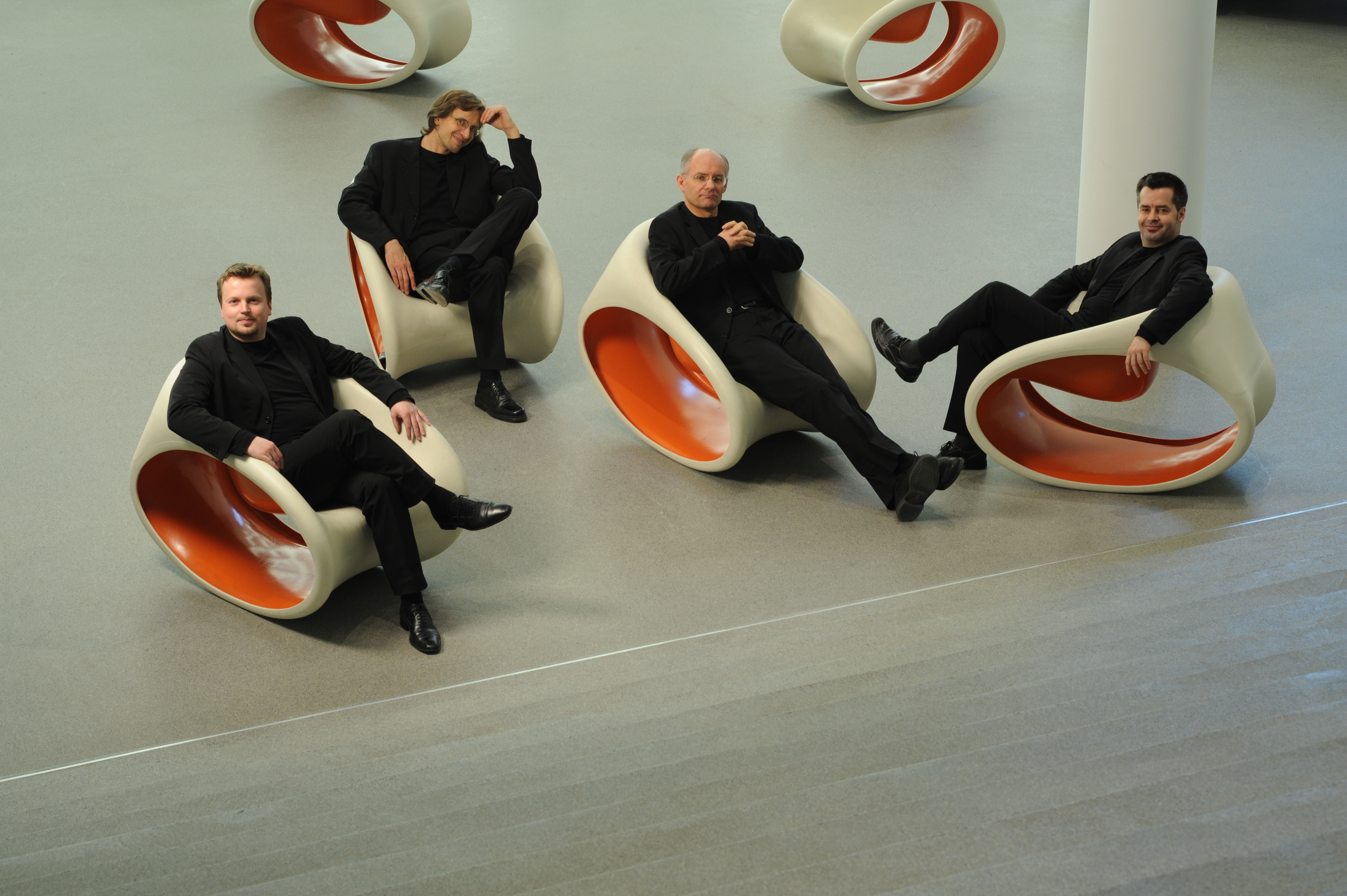
Stimmwerck, with, from left to right, Franz Vitzthum, counter-tenor; Marcus Schmidl, bass; Gerhard Hölzle and Klaus Wenk, tenors.

Stimmwerck was a male classical music vocal quartet ensemble specializing in the rediscovery and reproduction of the music of little known renaissance composers of the German-speaking world.

== History ==
Stimmwerck was founded in Munich, Germany in 2001, by four specialists in classical vocal ensemble singing; the two tenors, Gerhard Hölzle and Klaus Wenk, bass singer Marcus Schmidl, and counter tenor Franz Vitzthum. Stimmwerck disbanded in 2019.

== Purpose ==
Their name reflects the ensemble's structure and purpose. "Stimmwerck" comes from a 16th-century German term often used (for example, by Michael Praetorius) for a group of instruments of the same type but of different ranges, similar to the English term "consort of instruments". Thus, the ensemble was a “Stimmwerck” of classically trained male voices in varying ranges, attuned to one another in skill.

The focus of their work together was the bringing of forgotten or less well known renaissance composers of early music in the German-speaking regions once again into public recognition. To achieve this, they collaborated extensively with musicologists such as Ian Rumbold, Inga Mai Groote, and Katelijne Schiltz and actively engage in research. The results tok form as recordings, public performance in concerts, on tour and at early music festivals, and as their own 3-day annual festival in August, the Stimmwercktage, on the Adlersberg near Regensburg, Germany, which was broadcast each year by Bayerischer Rundfunk. Stimmwercktage are being continued as Singer Pur Tage.

== Recordings ==
Stimmwerck recorded with Christophorus Records, Aeolus and Cavalli Records, among others, and had received praise for their work from the critical press. Their first compact disks, with works by Heinrich Finck (1445–1527), and Adam of Fulda (1444–1505), each received the highest possible rating of 5 stars in “Goldberg Magazine”.

=== Discography ===
- Heinrich Finck (1444–1527): Missa Dominicalis und Lieder (Cavalli Records), 2006*
- Adam von Fulda (ca. 1445–1505): Messe - Motetten - Lieder (Cavalli Records), 2007
- Musik in St Michael, Vol 3, (DD Medien, Inigomedien), 2007
- The St. Emmeram Codex (Aeolus (Note 1), 2008 - Their most recently released recording covers a late medieval repertoire taken from the Regensburg Codex St. Emmeram, and received praise from the musical press for the quality and importance of the music chosen as well as for the singing performances.
- Lassus, Gyri Gyri Gaga - Lust und Leben. with the instrumental ensemble “La Villanella Basel”. Christophorus Records 2010
- Leonhard Päminger, Sacred works. Christophorus Records 2011
- Susanne un jour - Lassus, Missa Susanne un jour and other works. Aeolus Records 2012

== Live performance ==
Stimmwerck give concerts both in Germany and abroad. They have been featured guests at

- Laus Polyphoniae Antwerp
- Bach Festival Leipzig
- Vienna’s “Resonanzen” Festival of early music.

=== Festival: Stimmwercktage – Stimmwerck Days ===
Since 2005, the ensemble held an annual festival in early August named the “Stimmwercktage” (Stimmwerck Days) on the Adlersberg near Regensburg. There, using such modern technology as laptops and projectors in place of paper manuscripts, the works of a particular renaissance composer were the subject of German language lectures by musicologists and performances by Stimmwerck.

In previous years, works by the following composers were examined:

- 2008 Ludwig Senfl (1486-1542/43)
- 2007 Anonymus
- 2006 Leonhard Lechner (c.1553-1606)
- 2005 Jacob Obrecht (1457/1458 – late July, 1505)

== Videos ==
- StimmWercktage 2008
- Mensuralcodex St. Emmeram, „Quam pulchra es“ with commentary by Ian Rumbold
