= Kathryn Starkey =

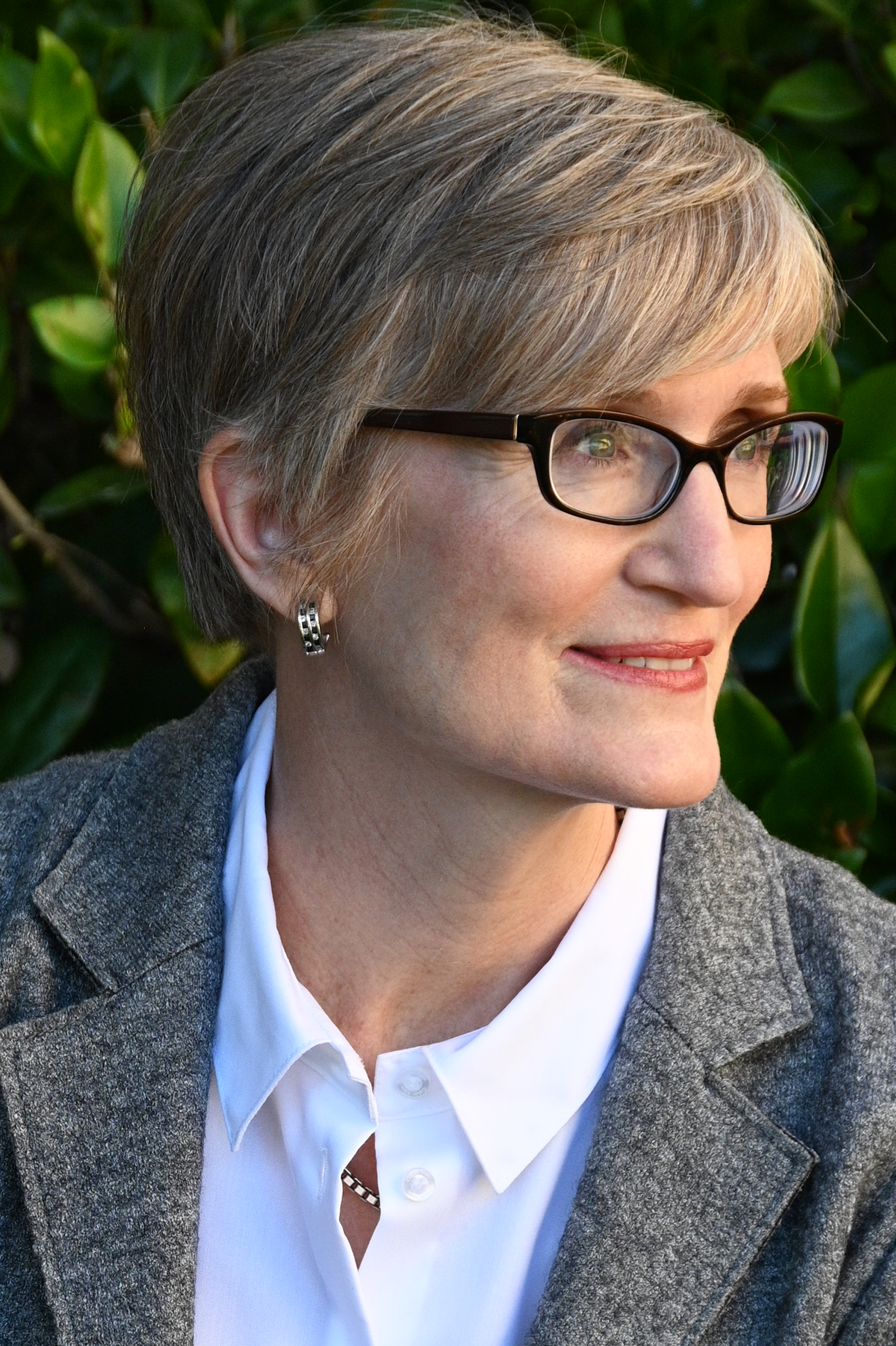
Kathryn Starkey

Kathryn Starkey is Professor of German Studies and, By Courtesy, English, History, and Comparative Literature, at Stanford University. She is author of several books and articles on medieval German philology and visual culture.

She has also co-edited multiple books on different aspects of medieval literature and culture. Her recent translation of the works of Neidhart von Reuental was the first published in English. She is the PI on the Global Medieval Sourcebook, and has worked in multiple international collaborations, including through the Alexander von Humboldt Foundation on Tristan and Isolde and Cultures of Emotion in the Middle Ages.

== Education ==
Before earning her PhD from the University of California, Berkeley, she studied at Queen's University in Canada.
