= Ensemble Leones =

Ensemble Leones is an early music ensemble founded by Marc Lewon in 2008 and is dedicated to the performance of secular music from the 12th to the 16th century, with particular attention to Medieval German repertories and early Renaissance instrumental music.

== Discography ==
- Les fantaisies de Josquin – The Instrumental Music of Josquin Desprez (Christophorus, 2011) – includes the première recording of "Sei gelobt, du Baum" by Arvo Pärt
- Neidhart. A Minnesinger and his "Vale of Tears": Songs and Interludes (Naxos, 2012) – première recording of the Frankfurt Neidhart-Fragment
- Colours in the Dark – The Instrumental Music of Alexander Agricola (Christophorus, 2013) – includes première recordings of agricology VIII & IX by Fabrice Fitch
- The Cosmopolitan – Songs by Oswald von Wolkenstein (Christophorus, 2014) with a preface by Dieter Kühn
- Argentum et Aurum – Musical Treasures from the Early Habsburg Renaissance (Naxos, 2015)
- Hör, kristenhait! Sacred Songs by the Last of the Minnesingers (Oswald von Wolkenstein, Der Mönch von Salzburg et al.), Ensemble Leones (Christophorus 2015)
- Straight from the Heart – The Chansonnier Cordiforme, Ensemble Leones (Naxos 2016)
