= Rochus von Liliencron =

German historian (1820–1912)

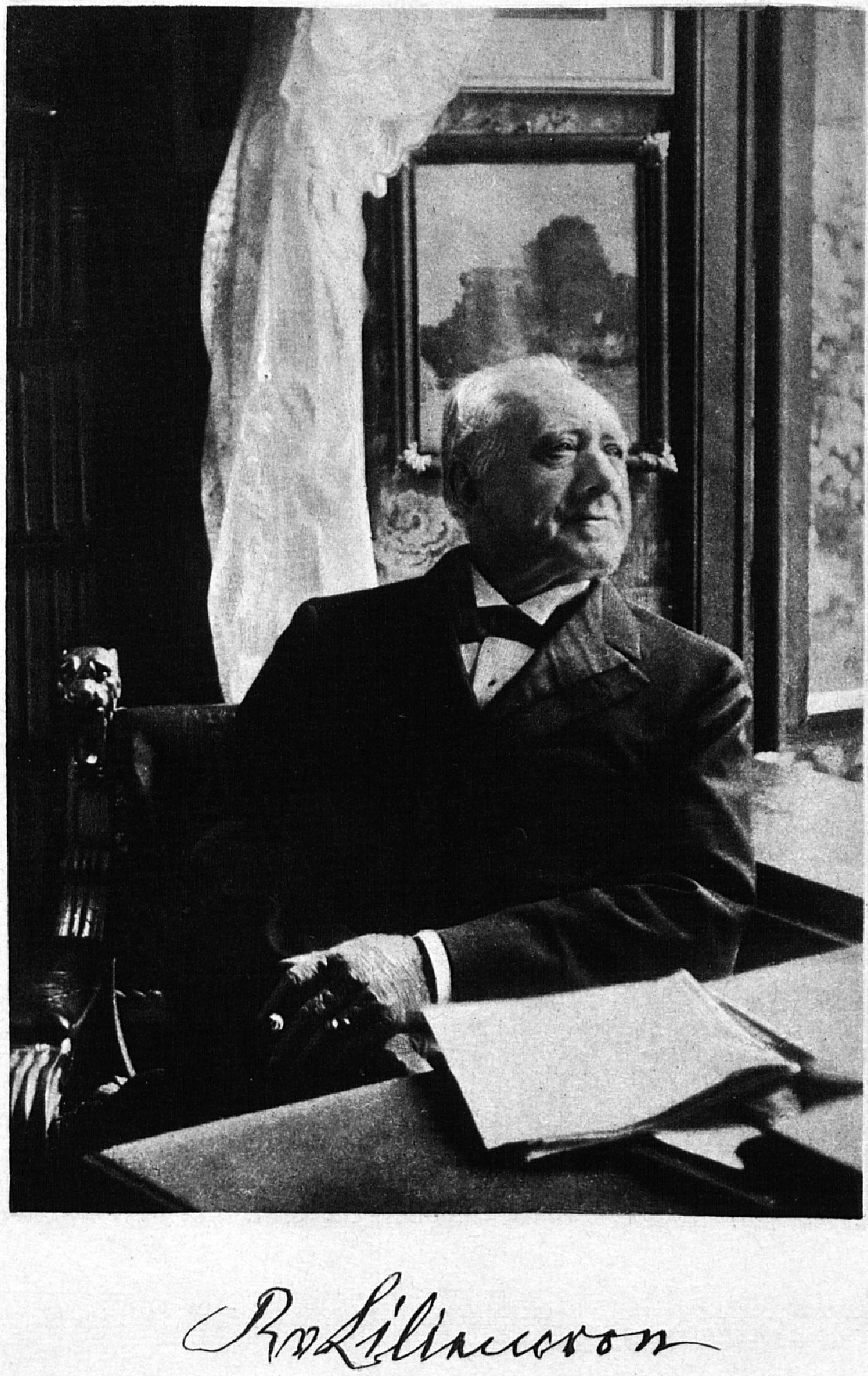
Rochus von Liliencron

Rochus Wilhelm Traugott Heinrich Ferdinand Freiherr von Liliencron (born 8 December 1820 in Plön, d. 5 March 1912 in Koblenz) was a Germanist and historian, known for his collection of German Volkslieder (folk songs), published in five volumes in 1865–1869, and as the editor of the biographical reference work Allgemeine Deutsche Biographie (ADB), published 1875–1912.

He studied theology and oriental languages at the University of Kiel, law and history at the University of Berlin, then returned to the Kiel, where he studied German philology under Karl Müllenhoff. In 1846 he received his PhD with a thesis on minnesinger Niedhart von Reuenthal's Höfische Dorfpoesie. In 1850/51 he served as chair of Nordic languages at Kiel, and in 1852 was named associate professor of German literature at the University of Jena.

In 1869 he joined the editorial board of the Allgemeine Deutsche Biographie on behalf of the historical commission at the Royal Bavarian Academy of Sciences. From 1875 to 1912, 56 volumes of the ADB were published. From 1900 to 1912, he served as chairman of the Prussian Musikgeschichtliche Kommission. Under his chairmanship, the commission made public 42 volumes of Denkmäler deutscher Tonkunst ("Monuments of German musical art").
