= Adam of Fulda =

15th-century German composer and music theorist

Adam of Fulda (c. 1445 – 1505) was a German composer and music theorist of the second half of the 15th century. He was born in Fulda and died in Wittenberg.

In Heinrich Glarean's Dodecachordon he is described as Francum Germanum, i.e., of German origin. Adam of Fulda calls himself at times musicus ducalis (musician of the Court). He also mentions Guillaume Dufay (1397 - 1474) as his contemporary.

== Biography ==
Adam of Fulda was born approximately 1445. He was educated at the Benedictine Monastery at Vornbach Abbey, where he wrote his De musica. After leaving the monastery, he was a lecturer at the Wittenberg University in Torgau, where he was one of the scholars involved with Renaissance humanism. From 1490 he was choir director.

== Writings ==
Three writings of his are known. De musica is a four-part manuscript written in Strasbourg, dated 4 November 1490. It deals in 7 chapters with an explication, invention and praise of music; in 21 chapters with the human hand, the chant, the voice, the clefs, the mutation and the keys; in 13 chapters with mensural music and in 8 chapters with proportions and consonances.

He wrote "Ein ser andechtig Cristenlich Buchleī aus hailigē schrifften vnd Lerern von Adam von Fulda in teutsch reymenn gesetzt" (A very pious and Christian booklet from the Holy writings and studies by Adam of Fulda set in German rhymes), published in Wittenberg in 1512 (reprinted, Berlin, 1914).

Fulda began another work which was to be a history of Saxony. It was completed by Johannes Trithemius after Adam's death in 1514 as Annales Hirsaugiensis.

== Musical works ==
Most of Adam's musical works are liturgical settings or secular songs. He wrote one mass, and several liturgical works. Niemöller lists 3 secular songs.

== Recordings of works by Adam of Fulda ==
Ach hülf mich leid and other works by Adam of Fulda have been recorded by the German Renaissance-music vocal group "Stimmwerck".
