= Don Cossacks Choir Russia =

The Don Cossacks Choir Russia (Хор донских казаков России) is a Russian folk choir of returned exiles and native Russian cossacks, founded in 1992 and led by the Dutch conductor Marcel Verhoeff (Russian; Марсель Верхуф). The choir takes inspiration from the Don Cossack Choir of Serge Jaroff (1921) which continues to exist independently outside Russia. The new choir was formed when, following the Gorbachev era, changes in Russia allowed both exiled cossacks to come home and also native Russian cossacks to reassert their traditions.

== Discography ==
- Russian Christmas Christophorus Records. Old Church Slavonic libretto with English and German translations.
- Russian Romances Christophorus. Cyrillic libretto with English and German translations.
