= Hermann Finck =

German composer (1527–1558)

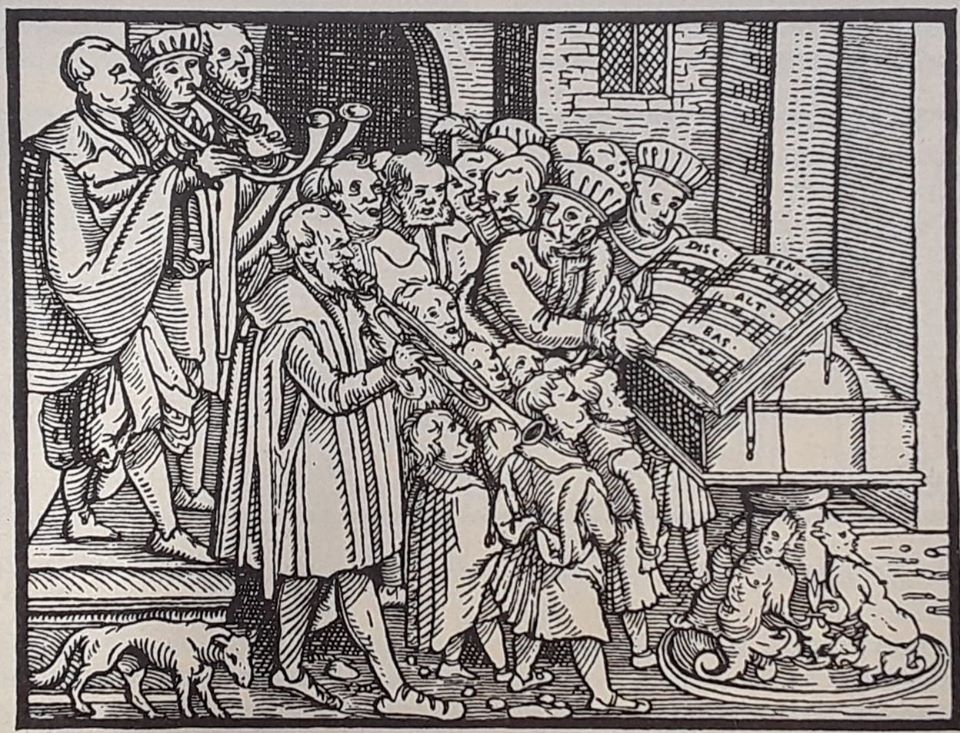
- Born: 21 March 1527; Pirna, Germany
- Died: 28 December 1558 (aged 31); Wittenberg, Germany
- Occupations: Writer, Composer, Organist

Hermann Finck (21 March 1527 – 28 December 1558) was a German music theorist, composer and organist.

== Career ==
Finck was born in Pirna, and died at Wittenberg. After 1553 he lived at Wittenberg, where he was organist, and there, in 1555, was published his collection of wedding songs. In 1545 he matriculated at Wittenberg University and then taught at the university from 1554 and became an organist in 1557.

== Works ==
His most celebrated work is entitled Practica musica, exempla variorum signorum, proportionum, et canonum, judicium de tonis ac quaedam de arte suaviter et artificiose cantandi continens (Wittenberg, 1556). It is of great historic value, but very rare. In the work, he praised Gombert as a great master and he condemned the German organ style of the time for being noisy and amorphous. In book five, entitled, "On the Art of Singing Elegantly and Sweetly" he gave advice to singers.

== Family ==
Finck was the great-nephew of composer Heinrich Finck.
