= Heinrich Finck =

German composer (died 1527)

Heinrich Finck (1444 or 1445 – 9 June 1527) was a German composer. He served as Kapellmeister first for Prince Alexander of Lithuania, later King of Poland, before leaving Poland in 1510. He worked in Stuttgart before becoming a member (and months before his death, the Kapellmeister) of the Hofkapell.

He was the great-uncle of the music theorist and composer Hermann Finck (1527–1558).

== Biography ==
He was probably born at Bamberg, but nothing is certainly known either of the place or date of his birth. Between 1492 and 1506 he was a musician in, and later possibly conductor of the court orchestra of successive kings of Poland at Warsaw. He held the post of conductor at Stuttgart from 1510 until about 1514, then was a composer at the Hofkapelle of Emperor Maximilian I, from 1519(?) at the chapter in Salzburg, and in 1527 Hofkapellmeister of Emperor Ferdinand I in Vienna, where he died.

== Works ==
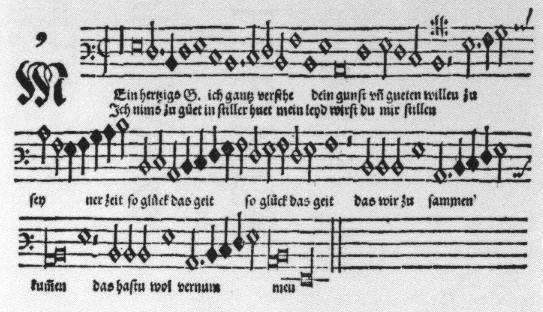
The tenor part of Finck's Mein herzigs G, published in Nuremberg in 1536

His works, mostly part songs and other vocal compositions, show great musical knowledge, and amongst the early masters of the German school he holds a high position. They are found scattered amongst ancient and modern collections of songs and other musical pieces. The library of Zwickau possesses a work containing a collection of fifty-five songs by Finck, printed about the middle of the 16th century.

== Recordings ==
The German vocal ensemble group "Stimmwerck" has recorded a CD of vocal works by Finck, including his "Missa Dominicalis"; and the Josquin Capella another including his "Missa Ave Preclara".
