= Hildegard von Bingen: Celestial Hierarchy =

Studio album by Sequentia
- Released: May 15, 2013
- Recorded: November 2012
- Genre: Classical
- Length: 72:00
- Label: Deutsche Harmonia Mundi

Sequentia chronology
Endzeitfragmente (2011)	Hildegard von Bingen: Celestial Hierarchy (2013)

Professional ratings
Review scores
Source	Rating
Allmusic	4/5 stars

Hildegard von Bingen: Celestial Hierarchy is a studio album by German musical group Sequentia. It was released in May 2013 under Deutsche Harmonia Mundi.

== Track listing ==
No.	Title	Length
1.	"O Splendidissima Gemma"	10:21
2.	"O Dulcis Electe"	4:33
3.	"O Speculum Columbe"	7:33
4.	"O Spectabiles Viri"	5:33
5.	"O Cohors Milicie Floris"	13:45
6.	"O Victoriosissimi Triumphatores"	8:29
7.	"Kyrieleison"	3:12
8.	"O vos Imitatores Excelse"	4:23
9.	"O Gloriosissimi Lux"	5:11
10.	"O vos Angeli"	8:39
