= Leonhard Päminger =

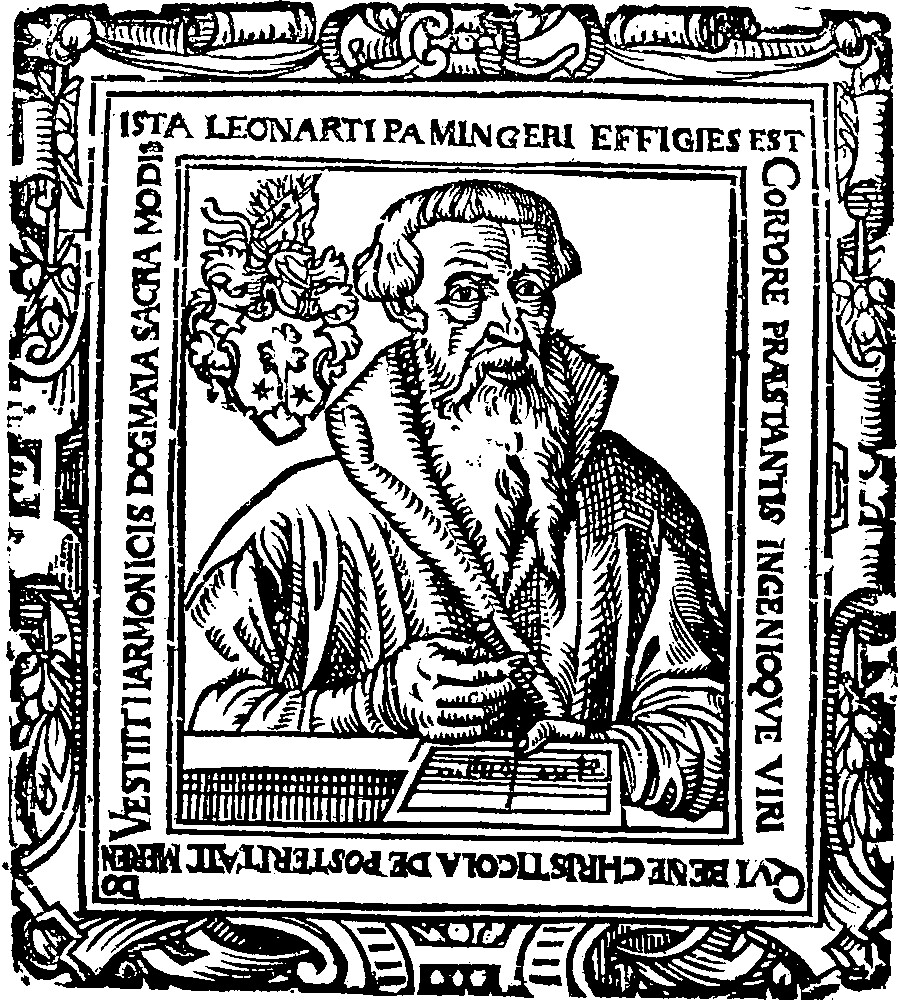
Leonhard Päminger

Leonhard Päminger also Paminger and Panninger (Aschach an der Donau, 29 March 1495 - Passau, 1567) was an Upper-Austrian born Lutheran theologian, poet and composer in Catholic Bavaria.

Leonhard Päminger's father Andreas was mayor of Aschbach in upper Austria. He came to Passau in 1516 as a scribe. His son, the composer Sigismund Päminger was born in 1539. As a school official he was free, as a Lutheran, to compose outside church employ. In addition to his duties he was a poet and theologian and corresponded with Martin Luther, Philip Melanchthon, and Veit Dietrich.

== Works ==
Päminger was a prolific composer, with more than 700 of his works surviving.

== Recordings ==
- Sacred Music Ensemble Stimmwerck, Christophorus Records 2010
