= Ensemble für frühe Musik Augsburg =

German medieval music ensemble

The Ensemble für frühe Musik Augsburg is a German early music ensemble founded in 1977 and specializing in medieval music. The ensemble is regarded as "renowned" in Germany.

The founding members are Hans Ganser (voice, recorder, percussion), Rainer Herpichböhm (voice, lute, gothic harp), Heinz Schwamm (voice, fiddle, bombard). In 1981 they were joined by the recorder and shawm player and singer Sabine Lutzenberger. Hans Ganser is also a noted musicologist. For example, Ganser was with Hans-Dieter Munck the first to fit one of Wolkenstein's song texts to a tune by Binchois. Ganser and Herpichböhm are also the editors of an edition of Wolkenstein's songs (1978). The ensemble's musicological work has often formed the framework for practical research into medieval and monastic music.

== Discography ==
The ensemble has been closely associated since its beginning with Christophorus Records:

- Weihnachten im Mittelalter - Christmas in the Middle Ages CHR 77271, Christophorus Entrée CHE 01162, 2004
- Trobadors, Trouvères, Minnesänger - Songs and dances of the Middle Ages CHE 0148-2
- Camino de Santiago - Music on the Pilgrimage. Wer daz elend bauen will and other works CHR 74530
- Oswald von Wolkenstein: A selection of 24 songs CHR 74540
- Hildegard von Bingen und ihre Zeit - and her time CHR 74584, 1990
- Neidhart von Reuental - 14 songs CHR 77327
- Amours et Désirs - songs of the Trouvères CHR 77117
- Planctus Mariae - Late medieval music for Holy Week CHR 77147, 1994
- Mönch von Salzburg - secular songs CHR 77176
- The Ancient miracles - songs and instrumental music of the Middle Ages CHR 77178, 1995
- Mysterium Mariae - Marian songs of the late Middle Ages CHR 77188, 1998
- Hildegard von Bingen - Celestial Stairs CHR 77205, 1997
- Melancolia - German love songs from the Autumn of the Middle Ages CHR 77225
- Minnesang, Die Blütezeit - The blooming CHR 77242
- Minnesang II, Die Spätzeit - The late period CHR 77003
- Auf Jakobs Wegen - Pilgerfahrt nach Santiago im Mittelalter. Ad te levavi and other works. CHR 77264
- Le manuscrit perdu de Strasbourg - Tuba gallicalis and other works. Solstice Records 146
- Schlager um 1500 - Intrada Melchior Franck and other pieces. 1989. Reissued as Renaissance Pop Songs Christophorus Entrée CHE 0310-2 2007
- Et in terra pax CHR 77139, 1993

Compilation:

- Zeit der Dämmerung - The Dawn of the Middle Ages (Catalogue CD, various artists) CHR 77003
