= Sequentia (group) =

Early music ensemble

Sequentia is an early music ensemble, founded in 1977 by Benjamin Bagby and Barbara Thornton. The group specializes mainly in Medieval music. Sequentia focuses particularly on music with texts, specifically chants and other stories with music, such as the Icelandic Edda. They are interested in the interplay between drama and music, and sometimes do partially staged performances, such as that of Hildegard of Bingen's Ordo Virtutum. Bagby and Thornton have both been active in original research on the projects they perform.

== History ==
Originally formed in Basel in 1977, the group moved to Cologne, Germany the same year, where they would work for more than twenty years. In 2002, Sequentia relocated to Paris.

In 1977, while still at Basel, Thornton and Bagby, together with the group Studio der frühen Musik and some associated singers, staged two 12th century miracle plays relating to Saint Nicholas; the plays were taken on tour and a live recording from a performance in Amsterdam was put out the following year on an LP entitled Ludi Sancti Nicolai ("Plays of St.Nicholas"; EMI Electrola, 1978). Although the singers involved used the name "Ensemble Vocale Guillaume Dufay", this experimental staging of two church dramas can be regarded as the debut record of Sequentia; the dramatic and angular vocal style and the approach to partly improvised instrumentation already has much in common with their later recordings.

In 2016 the group performed Songs of Consolation, a piece written in the year 523 by the philosopher Boethius during his imprisonment prior to his execution. It followed restoration work of the 11th century manuscript stolen from Cambridge University that contained the pieces.

The only long-term members of Sequentia have been Benjamin Bagby, Barbara Thornton, Norbert Rodenkirchen, and Katarina Livljanic after Thornton's death. Margriet Tindemans was a member for the first nine years of the group's existence. Tenor Wolodymyr Smishkewych has sung with several projects since 2000. The rest of the members are hired according to the needs of the particular project.

They mainly record on the Deutsche Harmonia Mundi label.

== Discography ==
- Ludi Sancti Nicolai (1978, as Ensemble Vocale Guillaume Dufay, with Studio der frühen Musik)
- Spielmann und Kleriker (1981, subtitled Minstrels and Clerics and Jongleurs et Clerics)
- Wandering Satirists of Medieval Germany (1983)
- Trouvères. Courtly love songs from Northern France (1984)
- English Songs of the Middle Ages (1988)
- Philippe le Chancelier: School of Notre Dame (1990)
- Frauenlob. Heinrich von Meissen (1990)
- Philippe de Vitry: Motets and Chansons (1991)
- Vox Iberica:
  - I: Sons of Thunder. Music for St. James the apostle. Codex Calixtinus, 12th century (1992)
  - II: Codex Las Huelgas (1992)
  - III: El Sabio. Songs for King Alfonso X of Castile and Léon (1991)
- The Bordesholm Lament of the Virgin Mary (1992)
- Oswald von Wolkenstein: Songs (1993)
- Dante and the Troubadours (1993)
- Aquitania. Christmas Musik from Aquitanien Monasteries (1994/96)
- Visions from the Book (1996)
- Shining Light. Christmas Music from Aquitanien Monasteries (1996)
- Edda. Myths from Medieval Iceland (1996)
- The Rheingold Curse (2001)
- Lost Songs of a Rhineland Harper (2004)
- Chant Wars (2004)
- Fragments for the End of Time / Endzeitfragmente (2008)
- Hildegard von Bingen: Complete Edition
  - Symphoniae. Spiritual Songs (1985)
  - Canticles of Ecstasy (1994)
  - Voice of the Blood (1995)
  - O Jerusalem (1997)
  - Saints (1997)
  - Ordo Virtutum (1982, re-recorded 1998)
  - Celestial Hierarchy (2013)
- Boethius: Songs of Consolation (2018)
