= Christophorus Records =

German classical music label

- Founded: 1939
- Genre: Classical
- Country of origin: Germany
- Location: Freiburg im Breisgau

Christophorus Records is a German classical music label based originally in Freiburg im Breisgau specializing in Catholic church and early music.

== History ==
The history of the Herder family in publishing in Freiburg goes back to Bartholomä Herder (1774–1839) Fürstbischöflicher Hofbuchhändler und Hofbuchdrucker in 1801. The publishing house of Herder still exists. The Christian book publishers Christophorus-Verlag Herder KG. was founded by Hermann Herder und Dr. Josef Knecht in 1935 as a passive resistance to developments in religion in Nazi Germany. Christophorus Schallplatten began as a part of the picture book division of Christophorus Verlag in 1939. The record label is now distributed by Musicontact GmbH, Heidelberg.

== Artists ==
Among the artists who have regularly recorded for the label are Ensemble für frühe Musik Augsburg, Johann Rosenmüller Ensemble, Spielleyt, Stimmwerck, and Don Cossacks Choir Russia.
