= Barbara Thornton =

American singer and musicologist (1950–1998)

Barbara Thornton (January 6, 1950 – November 8, 1998) was an American singer, musicologist, and groundbreaking performer of medieval music.

Thornton, described as “one of the most eminent medieval voices of our time”, was born in Summit, New Jersey and educated at Sarah Lawrence College, the Conservatorium van Amsterdam, and the Schola Cantorum Basiliensis. In 1977, she founded the ensemble Sequentia with Benjamin Bagby in Basel. They moved to Cologne that same year, where they lived and worked together for 21 years.

Sequentia has released many recordings, most of them on Deutsche Harmonia Mundi. In 1982, the group began to stage Hildegard of Bingen’s Ordo Virtutum, which proved so successful, both in concert and on record, that they undertook to record all of Hildegard's musical output—a project completed in 1998 for the celebration of the abbess's 900th birthday. The group has also performed music written in the 12th century from the musical centers Santiago de Compostela, Aquitaine, and Notre Dame.

Thornton died in Cologne on November 8, 1998, at the age of 48, after having suffered for a number of years from an inoperable brain tumour.

== Sources ==
- Anderson, Martin. 1998. Obituary: Barbara Thornton. ‘’Independent’’ (18 November).
- Neumann, Klaus L. 1999. "Barbara Thornton, 1950–98". Early Music 27, no. 1 (February): 169.
- Tick, Judith. 2001. "Women in Music, §I: Historiography". The New Grove Dictionary of Music and Musicians, second edition, edited by Stanley Sadie and John Tyrrell. London: Macmillan Publishers.
- Weber, Jerome F. 2001. "Harmonia Mundi". The New Grove Dictionary of Music and Musicians, second edition, edited by Stanley Sadie and John Tyrrell. London: Macmillan Publishers.
- Zahn, Robert von. 2001. "Cologne". The New Grove Dictionary of Music and Musicians, second edition, edited by Stanley Sadie and John Tyrrell. London: Macmillan Publishers.
