= Benjamin Bagby =

Most known for reciting the epic Anglo-Saxon poem "Beowulf"

Benjamin Bagby (born February 20, 1950) is an American singer, composer, harpist, and performer of medieval music.

== Biography ==
Born in Evanston, Illinois, Bagby was educated at Oberlin College, Ohio, and the Schola Cantorum in Basel, Bagby founded the ensemble Sequentia with Barbara Thornton in 1977. This group takes an innovative approach to medieval repertoires, especially with respect to their treatment of mode: they rely on the harmonic qualities of their voices to guide them through the different modes. Sequentia has released many recordings, most of them on Deutsche Harmonia Mundi. During the 1980s and 1990s, the group specialized in the music of Hildegard of Bingen; many of their most famous recordings are from this period. The group has also performed music written in the 12th century from the musical centers Santiago de Compostela, Aquitaine, and Notre-Dame de Paris.

Benjamin Bagby's work as a composer also contributes to his recreations of the ancient epics, such as Beowulf, the Icelandic Edda and German music from the 10th and 11th centuries on their recent recording Lost Songs of a Rhineland Harper. His version of Beowulf, which he has been touring around the world since the 1990s, is available on DVD (from a show in Copenhagen); his performance on May 9, 2003, at the International Congress on Medieval Studies is documented and discussed in, and was an impetus for, the 2012 anthology Beowulf at Kalamazoo.

He gave presentations internationally including at the University of Chicago Laboratory Schools.

Bagby (widowed from his longtime collaborator Barbara Thornton) married Croatian chant scholar Katarina Livljanić.

== Discography ==
- Spielmann und Kleriker, Deutsche Harmonia Mundi 1981, EMI 1988
- Hildegard von Bingen: Ordo virtutum, Deutsche Harmonia Mundi 1982, EMI 1987
- Spruchdichtung des 13. Jahrhunderts, Deutsche Harmonia Mundi 1983, EMI 1988
- Trouvères, Deutsche Harmonia Mundi 1984, Deutsche Harmonia Mundi/BMG Classics 1987
- Hildegard von Bingen: Symphoniae/Geistliche Gesänge, Deutsche Harmonia Mundi 1985, 1989
- English Songs of the Middle Ages/Englische Lieder des Mittelalters, Deutsche Harmonia Mundi 1988, 1989
- Philippe le Chancelier (ca. 1165–1236) – Conductus, Lai, Sequence, Rondellus/School of Notre Dame, Deutsche Harmonia Mundi/BMG Classics 1990
- Philippe de Vitry (1291-1361) – Motets and Chansons, Deutsche Harmonia Mundi/BMG 1991
- Vox Iberica I: Donnersöhne/Sons of Thunder – Gesänge für den hl. Jakobus (12. Jahrhundert), Deutsche Harmonia Mundi 1992
- Vox Iberica II: Codex Las Huelgas – Gesänge aus dem königlichen Konvent Las Huelgas de Burgos (13./14. Jahrhundert), Deutsche Harmonia Mundi/BMG Classics 1992
- Vox Iberica III: El Sabio – Gesänge für König Alfonso X. von Kastilien und Léon (1221–1284), Deutsche Harmonia Mundi/BMG Classics 1992
- Bordesholmer Marienklage (ca. 1475), Deutsche Harmonia Mundi/BMG Classics 1993.
- Oswald von Wolkenstein (1376-1445): Lieder/Songs, Deutsche Harmonia Mundi/BMG Classics 1993.
- Hildegard von Bingen: Canticles of Ecstasy, Deutsche Harmonia Mundi/BMG Classics 1994.
- Dante and the Troubadours, Deutsche Harmonia Mundi/BMG Classics 1995.
- Hildegard von Bingen: Voice of the Blood, Deutsche Harmonia Mundi/BMG Classics 1995.
- Visions from the Book, Deutsche Harmonia Mundi/BMG Classics 1996.
- Shining Light – Christmas Music from Aquitanian Monasteries (12th c.), Deutsche Harmonia Mundi/BMG Classics 1996.
- Aquitania – Christmas Music from Aquitanian Monasteries (12th c.), Deutsche Harmonia Mundi/BMG Classics 1997.
- Hildegard von Bingen: O Jerusalem, Deutsche Harmonia Mundi/BMG Classics 1997.
- Hildegard von Bingen: Saints, Deutsche Harmonia Mundi/BMG Classics 1998.
- Hildegard von Bingen: Ordo Virtutum, Deutsche Harmonia Mundi/BMG Classics 1998.
- Edda: Myths from Medieval Iceland, Deutsche Harmonia Mundi/BMG Classics 1999.
- Frauenlob (Heinrich von Meissen, ca. 1260-1318) – The Celestial Woman/Frauenlobs Leich, oder der Guldin Fluegel, zu latin: Cantica Canticorum, Deutsche Harmonia Mundi/BMG Classics 2000.
- The Rheingold Curse – A Germanic Saga of Greed and Vengeance from the Medieval Icelandic Edda, Marc Aurel Edition 2001.
- Lost Songs of a Rhineland Harper, Deutsche Harmonia Mundi/BMG Classics 2004.
- Krone und Schleier: Musik aus Mittelalterlichen Frauenklöstern/Crown and Veil: Music from Medieval Female Monasteries, Kunst- und Ausstellungshalle der BRD (Bonn)/Ruhrlandmuseum Essen 2005.
- Chant Wars – The Carolingian “Globalization” of Medieval Liturgical Chant, a collaboration with the ensemble Dialogos, directed by Katarina Livljanic, Deutsche Harmonia Mundi/Sony-BMG Music 2005.
- Fragments for the End of Time/Endzeitfragmente, Raumklang 2008.
- Hildegard von Bingen: Celestial Hierarchy, Deutsche Harmonia Mundi (Sony) 2013.
- Boethius: Songs of Consolation, Glossa 2018.
