= Vox Animae =

Vox Animae is an early music ensemble, founded in 1994 by director and instrumentalist Michael Fields. The group specialises in Medieval music, particularly vocal music, such as sequences, chants and other music with a strong story-line, such as Visitatio sepulchri. They are particularly keen on using drama to enhance the audience experience of the music, and feature staged performances individually crafted to suit each venue. (Also, education-outreach projects, talks and vocal workshops etc. according to each project). They are renowned for their presentation of Hildegard of Bingen's Ordo Virtutum.

Based in South-East England, the group has performed across the UK and Europe, also broadcast live on Danish Radio and BBC Radio 3.

Founder members of Vox Animae include sopranos Evelyn Tubb, Ansy Boothroyd and baritone John Hancorn; Lindsay Richardson, Ruth Gomme, Clare Norburn and the rest of the established team of vocal soloists also have extensive experience of this music. Choruses are sung by people recruited and coached locally for each performance.

== Reviews of the live performance and the DVD Recording ==
‘Stunning simplicity and pure serenity reach out to touch the heart of the listener...a cappella singing of excellent clarity and ensemble, the leading roles illuminating the parts with soaring virtuosity.’ Bournemouth Evening Echo

‘...the disciplined drama of Vox Animae's production extracted startling variety from the score - one was left marveling at Hildegard's daring.’ Opera Magazine

“This is a wonderful performance...the vocal artistry is at a very high level throughout. If I were forced to limit my library to only one recording of music by Hildegard von Bingen, this would be it. Continuo Magazine, USA

‘Opus Arte’s two DVD set explores Hildegard’s many facets and talents with a 70 minute performance of her musical morality play on the journey of the Soul, Ordo Virtutum. Followed by a fully dramatised BBC biographical documentary, Omnibus; a 40 minute documentary from The National Cathedral Washington; a 45 minute interview with two experts on Hildegard’s significance for us today, and a full gallery of Hildegard’s beautiful mystic Mandala-like paintings. A truly insightful performance and will be of interest to many who have a curiosity about human development. Excellent!’ In Balance Magazine

‘I can think of no better introduction to this earliest of music dramas than the performance filmed here... one is left overawed by the experience. But this is not just a performance of the Ordo Virtutum. Together, the two DVDs contain over four hours of material designed to create a well-rounded portrait of Hildegard. ... Certainly worth buying...’ International Record Review

This stylized performance, sung to music that blends the meditative qualities of Gregorian chant with lyrical emotional expression, presents Hildegard von Bingen's powerful vision of life's difficult journey. The stellar medieval music ensemble Vox Animae treats this morality play as part of a living dramatic tradition, while also stressing the story's contemporary relevance. Queen's University at Kingston [syllabus for study unit ‘Women, Gender and Music’]

‘I don't know whether it's the piece itself, or this highly stylized and impeccably conceived performance that converted me from a sceptic to a true believer. The end result is one of the most potent and electrifying - and profoundly moving - films I've seen in a long time.’ Kathy Dobkin, WNET, New York

== Discography ==
- Ordo Virtutum (Etcetera Record Company BV CD 1995 KTC 1203; also VHS 1997)
- Hildegard von Bingen In Portrait (double DVD OA 0874 D, published by BBC Opus Arte 2003)
