= Neidhart von Reuental =

German composer

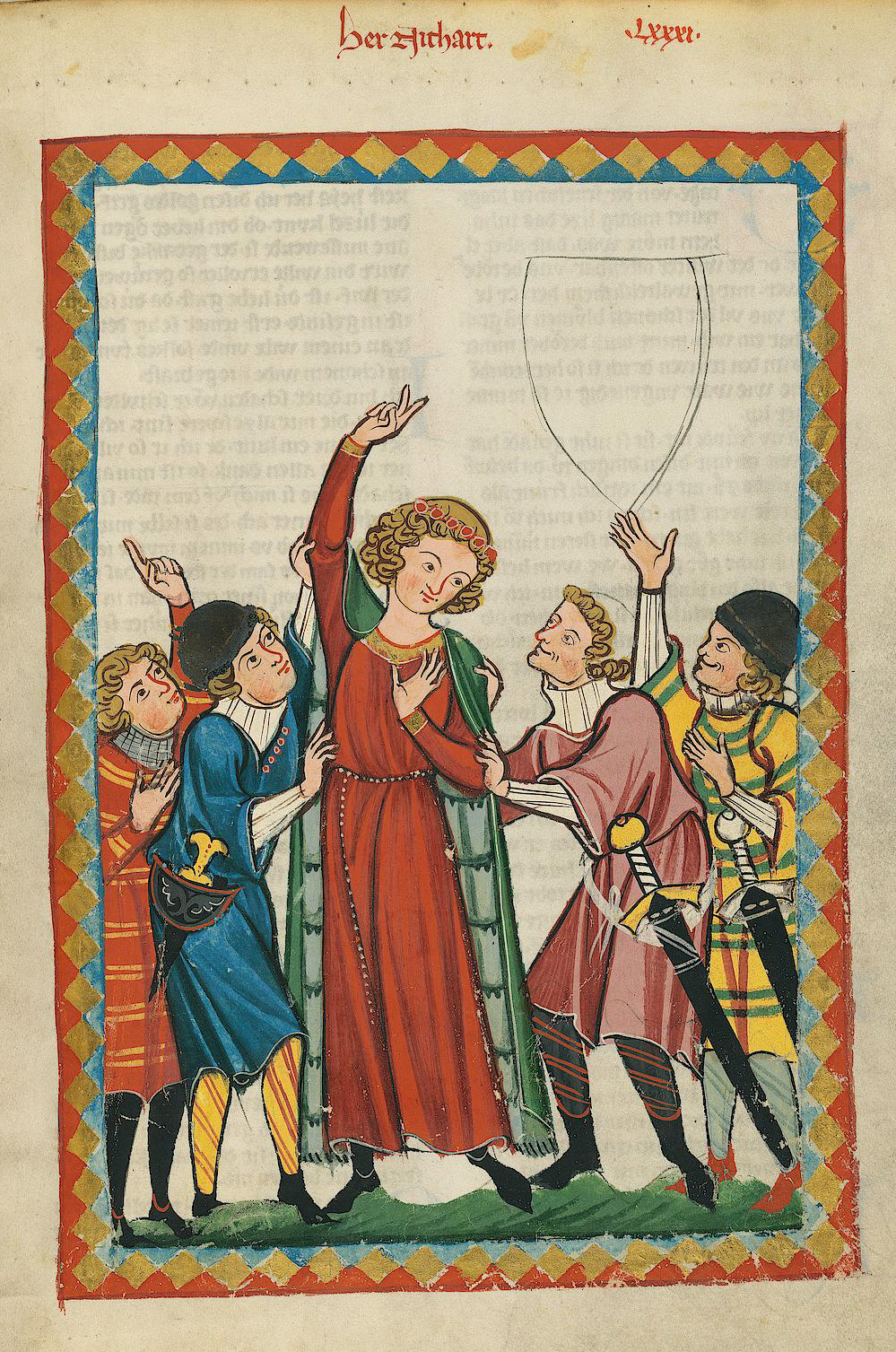
Neidhart portrayed in the Codex Manesse, about 1300

Neidhart (Middle High German Nîthart) c. 1190 – c. 1240 (later often called Neidhart von Reuental) was one of the most famous Minnesänger. With around 1500 documented strophes of his songs surviving, Neidhart has the largest corpus of surviving lyrics of any Minnesänger, suggesting the great popularity of the songs. In addition, and quite unlike any of his contemporaries, many melodies to his songs have been preserved: manuscripts have almost 70 melodies to 55 of his songs.

Neidhart's lyrics are highly innovative: into the courtly genre of Minnesang, he introduced peasant characters, who are often shown in conflict with the knightly class. Both classes are sometimes treated as objects of satire. His songs are traditionally divided into summer and winter songs (Sommerlieder, Winterlieder), each group opening with a piece of seasonal description of nature. But there are also songs which fall outside these categories and which in the past were often regarded as the work of later imitators.

Neidhart's works continued to enjoy great popularity long after his death. He was transformed into the legendary, peasant-hating "Neidhart Fuchs" in late 15th century comical stories (German Schwänke), and he also had a legacy in the visual arts, with woodcuts, frescos and carved reliefs portraying scenes from his songs.

== Life ==
In spite of the enduring popularity of his songs, there are no documentary sources for Neidhart's life. While the songs seem to offer a great deal of biographical, geographical, and historical information, this material relates to a poetic persona — a biographical basis cannot be assumed.

The song collections consistently give his name as Nîthart or, in its later Early New High German form, Neidhart. While the songs mention a knight von Riuwental, the identification of the poet with this knight is not found until the 15th century, and then in texts geographically remote from Neidhart's sphere of activity in Bavaria and Austria. However, this identification of the poet as "Neidhart von Reuental" was adopted by Moriz Haupt in his first critical edition of the songs in 1858 and was widely taken up until recently.

Attempts to locate a geographically plausible Reuental have not succeeded, and the name has in any case an emblematic quality — it means literally "Vale of Regret" — which supports the conclusion that it is a fictional location appropriate for songs of the unsuccessful pursuit of love. Indeed, the name Neidhart might be a pen name, as it was also used as a general term for an envious person and as a name for the devil.

There are only the most approximate dates for Neidhart's life. He is mentioned in Wolfram von Eschenbach's Willehalm, which would indicate that he was active in the 1210s, and born, therefore, perhaps in the 1190s. He is mentioned as deceased by Wernher der Gartenaere in Meier Helmbrecht, (c. 1250). Neidhart names Frederick II, Duke of Austria as his patron — since Frederick died in 1246 and there is no lament for him in Neidhart's surviving songs, it is assumed that Neidhart must already have died by that date.

While there is no certainty that apparently biographical details in the songs are correct, the evidence suggests that Neidhart spent the early part of his career in Bavaria and, possibly as a result of loss of patronage or political events surrounding the murder of Ludwig I of Bavaria, moved in the 1230s to the court of Duke Frederick II in Vienna. The songs mention not only Bavaria and Austria, but many individual places, including Landshut (the seat of the Bavarian dukes), Vienna, and locations in the vicinity of Vienna, which indicate detailed local knowledge. His tomb, probably erected at the behest of Duke Rudolf IV of Austria (1339–1365), is preserved on the south side of St. Stephen's Cathedral.

== The Songs ==
Neidhart's songs fall, both lyrically and musically, into two main categories, Summer Songs (Sommerlieder) and Winter Songs (Winterlieder). Although the terms themselves were first proposed in 1848 by Rochus von Liliencron, the distinction is already apparent in the way the songs are grouped in the 15th-century MS c., and the two types of song contrast both thematically and in structure.

=== Lyrics ===
In their lyrics, Neidhart's songs represent a break with the tradition of Minnesang. While his protagonist in the songs is a knight unable to attain the reward from his beloved that he believes he merits for his service to her — a standard Minnesang theme — instead of the court, the setting is that of the medieval village. The impoverished knight, often named as "von Riuewental", is enamored of a village maiden whose love he is unable to attain, but the reason is either the interference of the girl's mother or the competition from the upstart village males, who ape courtly dress and manners to impress the girl. The effect is essentially humorous, even satirical, contrasting court and village, and mocking both the courtly conventions and the social pretentions of the villagers.

==== Summer songs ====
The Summer Songs use a simple strophic form, the "dance strophe" (German Reienstrophe, from MHG reie, "circle dance", "carole") characterised by simple couplet and triple rhymes, e.g. AAABBB. Such forms are not common in Minnesang and are probably based on a native tradition of dance songs.

The Summer Songs all start with one or more strophes of natural description (German Natureingang) welcoming the coming of summer, sometimes contrasting it with the winter that has gone. A village girl is then introduced and she announces her intention to attend the country dance in amorous pursuit of the knight of her affections. This gives rise to a dialogue with her mother, who warns against seeking a partner of a higher station, or a girlfriend, who shares the girl's aims.

==== Winter songs ====
The Winter Songs use the three-part canzone form common in earlier Minnesang and generally have longer stanzas. The opening natural description is often a lament for the passing of summer. This is often followed by a lover's complaint about how the love of his "lady", herself in fact a village maiden, has been alienated by the pretentions of the villagers at the dance.

=== Music ===
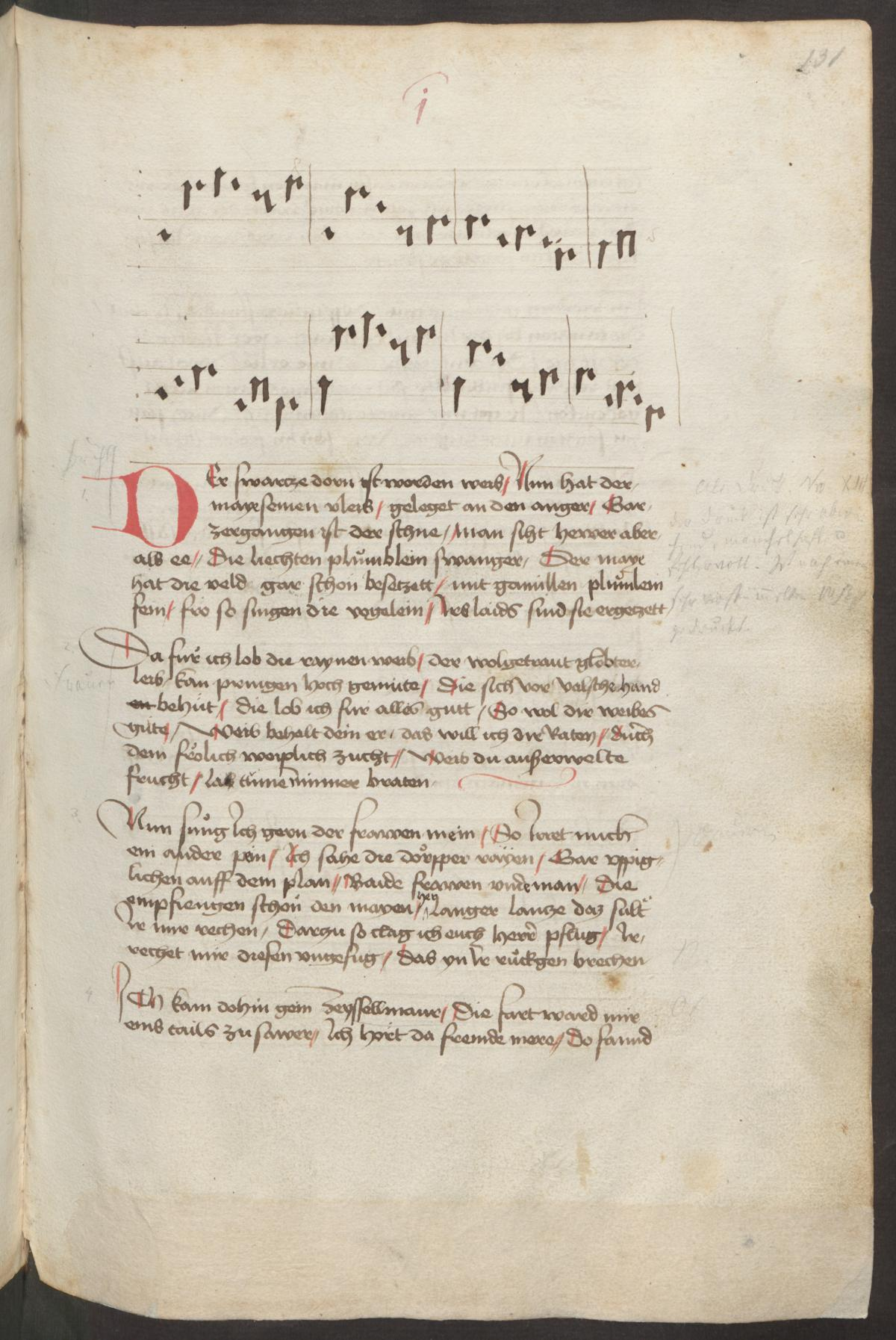
Melody and text of Neidhart's song "Der schwarze dorn" (MS c)

Melodies to 57 of Neidhart's songs are preserved, with several recorded in more than one manuscript. This is more than survive for all the other 12th- and 13th-century Minnesänger combined, a clear indication of their popularity. There are five melodies in the Frankfurt Fragment (MS O) from c. 1300, but otherwise the bulk of the melodies are in 15th-century MSS, the largest collection being in MS c. While many scholars have regarded the songs in MS c as being by Neidhart's imitators (and therefore reduce the number of "authentic" melodies to 17), musicologists have found no basis for differentiating between "authentic" and "inauthentic" songs. The melodic similarities between songs in MS O and their equivalents in MS c, roughly 160 years later, suggest that 15th-century melodies cannot simply be dismissed as later compositions.

All the songs are monophonic and the notation rarely indicates rhythm. However, many of Neidhart's lyrics describe dances or call on listeners to dance, and the melodies show features associated with dance songs. These include limited vocal range (an octave or a ninth), rapid movement between high and low notes, and a syllabic structure (i.e. one note per syllable). Hatto and Taylor note a contrast between the Summer and Winter songs, the former being more "exuberant and carefree" in their melodies. Lewon remarks that the melodies in the Frankfurt manuscript demand considerable virtuosity from the singer.

The main modes are the Dorian mode and the major mode.

== The Manuscript tradition ==
The earliest recorded lyric of Neidhart's is a single strophe "Nu gruonet aber diu heide" (R 12), in the Carmina Burana manuscript, c. 1230. But the main manuscripts are:

- R — Staatsbibliothek zu Berlin - Preußischer Kulturbesitz, mgf. 1062 (also called the "Riedegg MS", from its previous location in Schloss Riedegg in Upper Austria). Compiled in the late 13th century, probably in Lower Austria, it contains 58 song texts (383 strophes).
- C — Universitätsbibliothek Heidelberg cpg 848 (Manesse Codex) contains 209 strophes under Neidhart's name and, under various names, a further 48 which are attributed to Neidhart in other sources. It was probably compiled in Zürich in the first half of the 14th century. It contains a full-page illustration of Neidhart surrounded by peasants.
- c — Staatsbibliothek zu Berlin - Preußischer Kulturbesitz, mgf 779 (also called the "Ried MS" after an 18th-century owner), compiled probably in Nürnberg in the second half of the 15th century. It is the largest Neidhart collection, containing 131 songs (1098 strophes), along with 45 melodies (and space left for others), and is the largest single-author collection for any Minnesänger. In contrast to earlier manuscripts, each song here has a heading (a title or a genre description). Uniquely, the songs are grouped into Summer and Winter Songs.

All but a handful of Neidhart's songs are found in one or more of these three manuscripts. In addition, there are a further 28 manuscripts and fragments with song lyrics, including both the Kleine Heidelberger Liederhandschrift (Minnesang MS A, 14 songs) and the Weingarten MS (Minnesang MS B, 13 songs).

== Reception ==
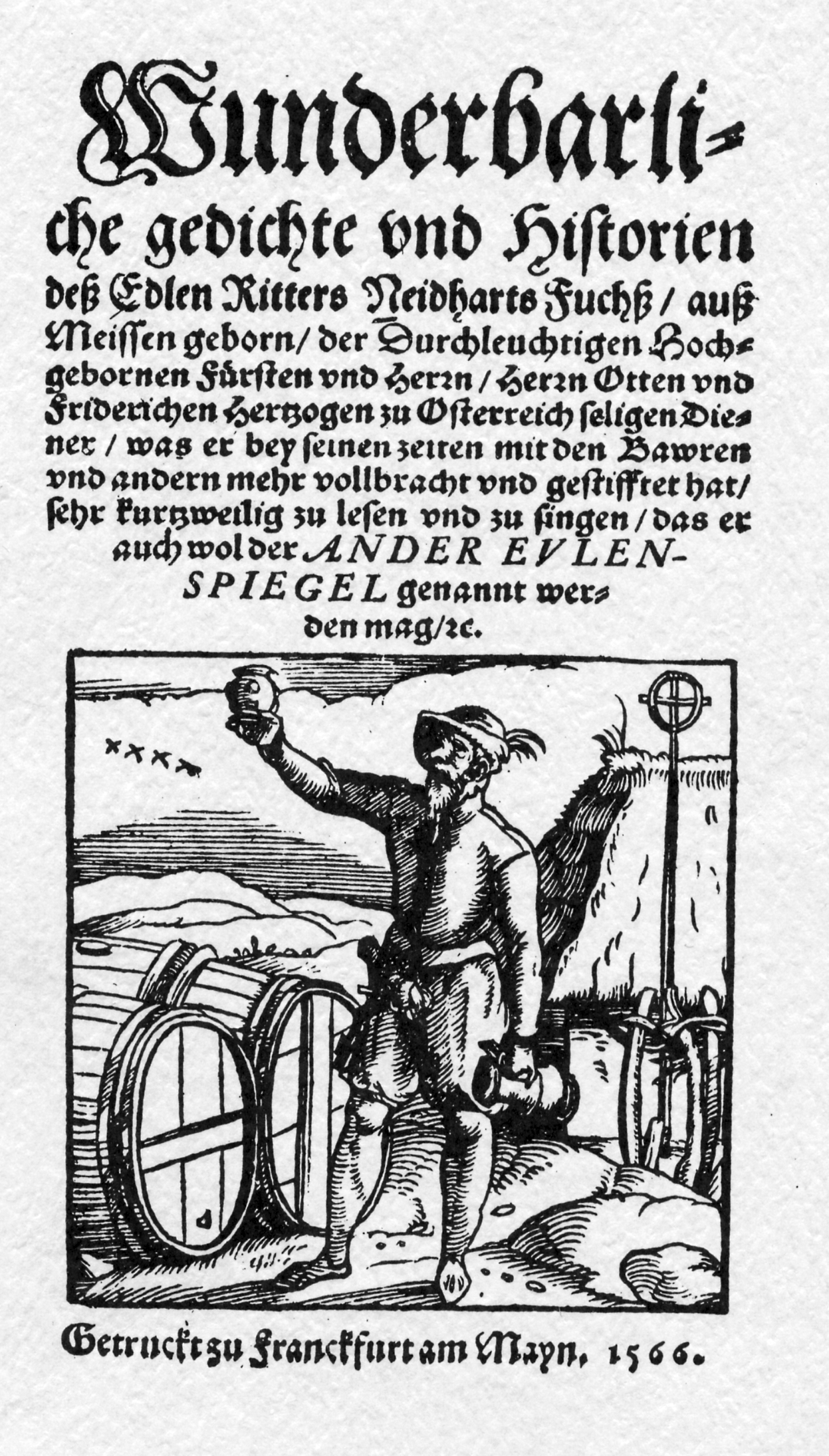
Cover of 1566 "Neithart Fuchs" print.

Neidhart's songs had a significant influence on later Minnesang. In particular the simple rhyming scheme of the Reienstrophe and the motif of the dialogue between two villagers (dörper), mother and daughter or two girlfriends, are taken up by later Minnesänger.

The conflict between court and village found in Neidhart's comic tales (Schwänke) finds its way into narrative verse works, as in, for example, Wernher der Gartenære's Meier Helmbrecht.

=== Neidhartspiele ===
In the 14th and 15th centuries the comic tales, particularly "The Tale of the Violet" (Veilchenschwank), formed the basis of five plays (Neidhartspiele). The earliest known performance of such a play is recorded in Arnhem on 23 February 1395 with a cast of apprentices.

=== Neithart Fuchs ===
The Neidhart persona of the songs was taken up by later generations and perpetuated as the figure of Neithart Fuchs (Fuchs= "fox"), the fictional knightly hero of a comic tale surviving in three printed editions, 1491–1566. The tale begins with the Veilchenschwank ("The Tale of the Violet"), after which the hero repeatedly bests the peasants with pranks and combat.

=== Frescoes ===
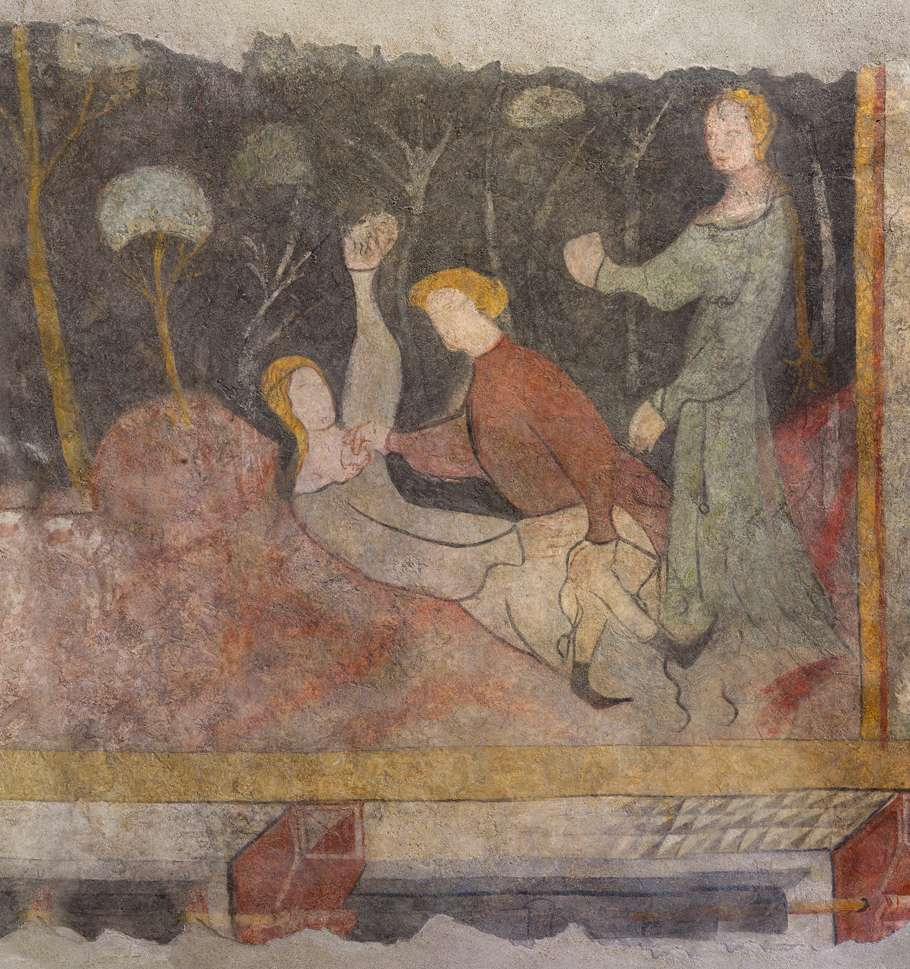
"Theft of the mirror" ("Spiegelraub") in the Neidhart frescos from the house at Tuchlauben 19, Vienna. This motif occurs in several of Neidhart's songs

In about 1407, Viennese cloth merchant Michel Menschein commissioned a series of four murals for his private dance-hall based on songs by Neidhart. Each fresco depicts scenes from one of the four seasons of the year. The frescoes are remarkable as one of the few surviving works of the kind on a secular subject from so early a date. They were discovered during redevelopment in 1979 and are exhibited in situ by the City of Vienna Museum, which undertook an extensive restoration.

== Editions ==
- Haupt, Moriz, ed. (1858). Neidhart von Reuenthal. Leipzig: Hirzel.
- Haupt, Moriz; Wiessner, Edmund, eds. (1923). Neidharts Lieder (2 ed.). Leipzig: Hirzel.
- Wießner, Edmund; Fischer, Hanns; Sappler, Paul, eds. (1999). Die Lieder Neidharts. Altdeutsche Textbibliothek. Vol. 44 (5 ed.). Tübingen: Niemeyer. ISBN 3-484-20144-4.
- Beyschlag, Siegfried, ed. (1975). Die Lieder Neidharts: der Textbestand der Pergament-Handschriften und der Melodien. Darmstadt: Wissenschafliche Buchgesellschaft. ISBN 3-534-03592-5.
- Wachinger, Burghart, ed. (2006). Deutsche Lyrik des späten Mittelalters. Frankfurt am Main: Deutsche Klassiker Verlag. pp. 18–95. ISBN 3-618-66220-3. (21 songs with German translation and commentary.)
- Müller, Ulrich; Bennewitz, Ingrid; Spechtler, Franz Viktor, eds. (2007). Neidhart-Lieder. Texte und Melodien sämtlicher Handschriften und Drucke. Vol. 3 volumes. Berlin, New York: de Gruyter. ISBN 978-3-11-019136-3. (Salzburger Neidhart-Edition)

=== English ===
- Hatto, A.T.; Taylor, R.J. (1958). The Songs of Neithart von Reuental. 17 Summer and Winter Songs Set to Their Original Melodies with Translations and a Musical and Metrical Canon. Manchester: Manchester University.
- Sayce, Olive (1967). "Nîthart (Neidhart von Reuental)". Poets of the Minnesang. Oxford: Oxford University Press. pp. 128–147. (Nine songs with notes in English.)
- Starkey, Kathryn; Wenzel, Edith, eds. (2016). Neidhart: Selected Songs from the Riedegg Manuscript (Staatsbibliothek Zu Berlin--Preussischer Kulturbesitz, Ms. Germ. Fol. 1062). Kalamazoo: ISD International. ISBN 9781580442244. With English translation and commentary.

=== Neidhartspiele ===
- Margetts, John, ed. (1982). Neidhartspiele. Graz: Akademische Druck- u. Verlagsanstalt. ISBN 3-201-01180-0.

=== Neithart Fuchs ===
- Bobertag, Felix, ed. (1884). "Neithart Fuchs". Narrenbuch: Kalenberger, Peter Leu, Neithart Fuchs, Markolf, Bruder Rausch. Berlin, Stuttgart: Spermann. pp. 141–292.
- Jöst, Erhard, ed. (1980). Die Historien des Neithart Fuchs nach dem Frankfurter Druck von 1566. Litterae. Göppingen: Kümmerle. ISBN 978-3874523547.

== Texts ==
The first strophe of a Summer and a Winter Song.

Sommerlied

Nu ist der küele winder gar zergangen,
diu naht ist kurz, der tac beginnet langen;
sich hebet ein wünneclîchiu zît,
diu al der werlde vreude gît;
baz gesungen nie die vögele ê noch sît.

— SL 21
Translation:

Now the cold winter has quite gone,
the night is short, the day begins to grow long.
A joyful time begins,
which brings happiness to the whole world;
the birds never sang better before or since.

— Trans. Olive Sayce

Rhyme scheme: AABBB

Winterlied

Owê dirre nôt!
wie hânt sich verwandelôt
dise liehten sumertage!
von sô senelîcher klage
trûret manic herze, daz in hôhem muote was.
deist ab elliu jâr,
daz der winder offenbâr
uns beroubet âne wer
mit gewalticlîchem her.
er benimt uns vil der schœnen bluomen unde gras,
alsô hât ein wîp
mich beroubet gar der sinne,
an den triuwen, unde ich sî sô herzenlîchen minne.
wie wart ungenædic ie sô minniclîcher lîp?

— WL 35
Translation:

Oh, the pity of it!
How changed
are those bright summer days!
Hearing such sad complaints
many a heart that had been in high-spirited desponds.
But it happens every year
that Winter
robs us, defenceless, in broad daylight
with a might host.
He deprives us of many lovely flowers and grasses.
In the same way a lady
has robbed me of my senses altogether,
believe me, and I love her so dearly!
How did so charming a person ever become so cruel.

— Trans. A.T.Hatto & R.J.Taylor

Rhyme scheme: AABBC DDEEC FGGF

== See also ==
- List of Austrian writers

== Recordings ==
Among the many recordings of Neidhart's songs, the following have his work as their main focus:

- Augsburg Early Music Ensemble (1990). Neidhart von Reuental: Vocal Music (CD). Christophorus.
- Ensemble Tourdion, Manfred Kamfert (1998). Her Nîthart hât gesungen. Lieder von Liebe und Spott (CD). Tourdion.
- Augsburg Early Music Ensemble (2004). Minnesang. Die Spätzeit (CD). Christophorus.
- Ensemble Leones (2012). Neidhart (c. 1185–c.1240). A Minnesinger and his 'Vale of Tears': Songs and Interludes (CD). Naxos.

=== Discography ===
- Weichselbaumer, Ruth (2007). "Diskografie". In Müller, Ulrich; Bennewitz, Ingrid; Spechtler, Franz Viktor (eds.). Neidhart-Lieder. Texte und Melodien sämtlicher Handschriften und Drucke. Vol. III. Berlin, New York: de Gruyter. pp. 609–613. ISBN 978-3-11-019136-3.
- Schubert, Martin (2018). "Diskografie". In Springeth, Margarete; Spechtler, Franz-Viktor (eds.). Neidhart und die Neidhart-Lieder. Ein Handbuch. Berlin, New York: de Gruyter. pp. 517–523. ISBN 9783110334067.
