= Ordo Virtutum =

Allegorical morality play by Hildegard Von Bingen

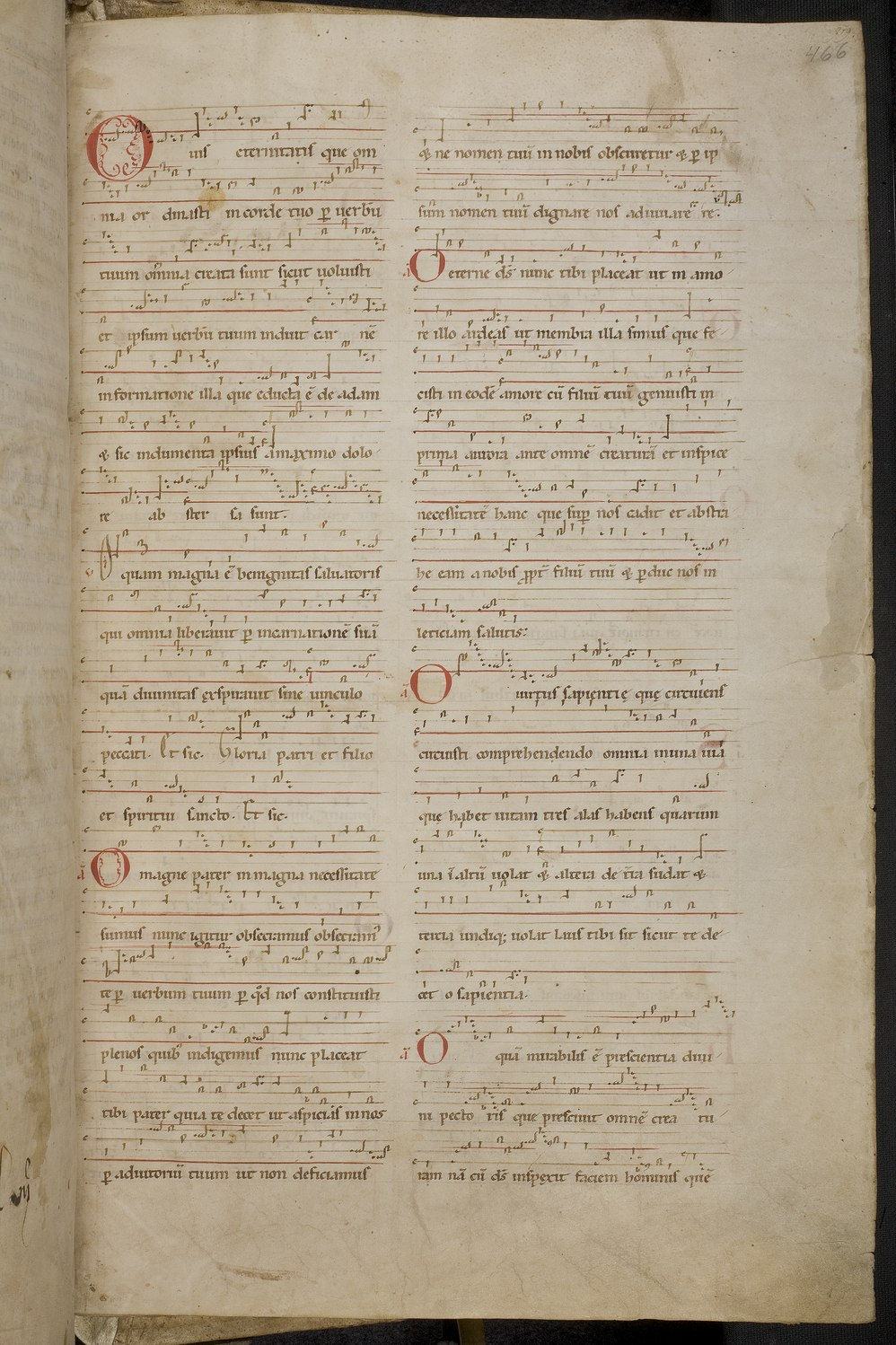
Page of the Ordo Virtutum from the Wiesbaden Codex, 1180 - 1190

Ordo Virtutum (Latin for Order of the Virtues) is an allegorical morality play, or sacred music drama, by Hildegard of Bingen, composed around 1151, during the construction and relocation of her Abbey at Rupertsberg. It is the earliest morality play by more than a century, and the only medieval musical drama to survive with an attribution for both text and music.

A short version of Ordo Virtutum without music appears at the end of Scivias, Hildegard's most famous account of her visions. It is also included in some manuscripts of the Symphonia armoniae celestium revelationum ("Symphony of the Harmony of Celestial Revelations"), a cycle of more than 70 liturgical songs. It may have been performed by the convent nuns at the dedication of the St. Rupertsberg church in 1152 or possibly before the Mass for the Consecration of Virgins at the convent.

== Plot ==
The subject of the play is typical for a morality play, recounting neither biblical events, nor a saint's life, nor miracles. Instead, Ordo Virtutum is about the struggle for a human soul, or Anima, between the Virtues and the Devil.

The piece can be divided as follows:

Part I: A Prologue in which the Virtues are introduced to the Patriarchs and Prophets who marvel at the Virtues.

Part II: We hear the complaints of souls that are imprisoned in bodies. The (for now) happy Soul enters and her voice contrasts with the unhappy souls. The Soul is too eager to skip life and go straight to Heaven. When the Virtues tell her that she has to live first, the Devil seduces her away to worldly things.

Part III: The Virtues take turns identifying and describing themselves while the Devil occasionally interrupts and expresses opposing views and insults. This is the longest section by far and, although devoid of drama or plot, the musical elements of this section make it stand out.

Part IV: The Soul returns, repentant. Once the Virtues have accepted her back, they turn on the Devil, whom they bind. Together they conquer the Devil and then God is praised.

Part V: A procession of all the characters.

== Roles ==
- The Soul (female voice).
- The Virtues (sung by 17 solo female voices): Humility (Queen of the Virtues), Hope, Chastity, Innocence, Contempt of the World, Celestial Love, Discipline? (the name is scratched out in the manuscript) Modesty, Mercy, Victory, Discretion, Patience, Knowledge of God, Charity, Fear of God, Obedience, and Faith.
  - These Virtues were seen as role models for the women of the Abbey, who took joy in overcoming their weaknesses and defeating the Devil in their own lives.
- Chorus of the Prophets and Patriarchs (sung by a male chorus)
- Chorus of Souls (sung by a women's chorus)
- The Devil (a male voice - the Devil does not sing, he only yells or grunts: according to Hildegard, he cannot produce divine harmony)

== Background ==
The meaning and emphasis of the Ordo Virtutum in Hildegard of Bingen's community is affected by role assignments among the nuns. It has been suggested that the soul represents Richardis von Stade, Hildegard's fellow nun and friend, who had left to become abbess of another convent. Hildegard was upset by this appointment and tried to have it revoked, appealing even to Pope Eugene III. Hildegard was unsuccessful and Richardis departed, only to die shortly thereafter on October 29, 1151. Other scholars propose an allusion to Hildegard's brother Bruno. Before dying, Richardis told her brother that she wanted to return to Hildegard, not unlike the returning, repentant Soul of Ordo Virtutum.

== Composition ==
Music was a part of daily life in the abbey, since the nuns chanted psalms several times a day during the Liturgy of the Hours. The performance of non-liturgical music was more rare, having to do with celebrations and special occasions in the life of the community. However, Hildegard of Bingen received no traditional education in composition, nor was she trained to play instruments. She was "self-taught," although not in a way that many people would expect. Her whole life, Hildegard of Bingen had been both clairvoyant and clairaudient. The music came to her in visions. She also attempted to describe what she was going through in works such as Ordo Virtutum.

== Musical elements ==
The Ordo Virtutum is written in dramatic verse and contains 82 different melodies, which are set more syllabically than Hildegard's liturgical songs. All parts are sung in plainchant except that of the Devil. There is an alternation between solo and chorus parts as well as melismatic versus syllabic lines.

The main "acts" in the play are set in allegorical towers and the musical dimensions are driven by the architectural understanding: for example, the development of processional chants that link the action in one tower to that of the other.

The final verses of the play move into a mystical mode and describe the crucifixion of Christ, asking the audience to bend their knees so that God may "stretch out his hand to you" (genua vestra ad patrem vestrum flectite / ut vobis manum suam porrigat, pp. 36–37). The final word, porrigat ("stretch out"), is set to thirty-nine notes, making it the longest melisma in the play. It is meant to illustrate the stretch of a divine hand toward humanity.

Hildegard of Bingen believed that music had a powerful, even medical effect on people. Music was a type of biblical meditation. The manner in which this was practiced resembles in some manner the way Buddhists meditate and other religious traditions use music. The neurologist Oliver Sacks has researched Hildegard's belief that music can bring a connection between the human brain's two hemispheres, to heal and calm the body.

== Editions ==
- Pitra, Jean-Baptiste-François, ed. (1882). "Ordo Virtutum". Analecta Sanctæ Hildegardis, opera Spicilegio Solesmensi parata. Analecta sacra Spicilegio Solesmense (in Latin). Vol. 8. Paris: A. Jouby & Roger. pp. 457–465. OCLC 633575447.
- Dronke, Peter, ed. (1970). "Ordo Virtutum". Poetic Individuality in the Middle Ages: New Departures in Poetry 1000–1150 (in Latin) (1st ed.). Oxford Clarendon Press. OCLC 807267992.
  - Dronke, Peter, ed. (1986). "Ordo Virtutum". Poetic Individuality in the Middle Ages: New Departures in Poetry 1000–1150. Westfield publications in medieval studies (in Latin). Vol. 1 (2nd ed.). Westfield College University of London Committee for Medieval Studies. pp. 180–192. ISBN 978-1-870059-00-8. OCLC 715235014.
- Feiss, Hugh; Evans, Christopher Francis; Kienzel, Beverly Mayne; Muessig, Carolyn Anne; Newman, Barbara Jane; Dronke, Peter, eds. (2007). "Ordo Virtutum". Opera minora I. Corpus Christianorum Continuatio Mediaevalis (in Latin). Vol. 226. Brepols. pp. 505–521. ISBN 978-2-503-05261-8. OCLC 237241526.

=== Translations ===
- Dronke, Peter, ed. (March 2008). "Ordo Virtutum" [The Play of the Virtues]. Nine Medieval Latin Plays. Cambridge Medieval Classics (in Latin and English). Vol. 1. Cambridge University Press. pp. 147–184. ISBN 978-0-521-72765-5. OCLC 190967426.
- "Ordo Virtutum (The Play about the Virtues)" (PDF). Translated by Linda Marie Zaerr. Boise State University, English department. 2013-05-29.

==== Performing edition ====
- Davidson, Audrey Ekdahl, ed. (1985). Hildegard von Bingen: Ordo Virtutum (Musical score) (in Latin and English). Kalamazoo: Western Michigan University, Medieval Institute Publications. ISBN 978-0-918720-62-7. OCLC 729364408.

==== Musical edition ====
- Ricossa, Luca Basilio, ed. (2013). Hildegard von Bingen: Ordo Virtutum (Musical score in original notation) (in Latin and French) (1st ed.). Geneva: Lulu. OCLC 985455640. (2nd, corrected ed.: 2014-09-04.)

== Recordings ==
- Sequentia. Hildegard von Bingen: Ordo virtutum. LP: Deutsche Harmonia Mundi 20.395/96; CD: CDS 7492498; MC: 77051-4-RG (1982). Includes translation by Peter Dronke.
- Vox Animae. Hildegard von Bingen: Ordo virtutum. CD: Etcetera Record Company BV KTC1203 (1995). Includes translation by Ansy Boothroyd and Michael Fields.
- Sequentia. Hildegard von Bingen: Ordo virtutum. CD: Deutsche Harmonia Mundi 05472 77394 2 (1997). Includes translation by Peter Dronke.
- Vox Animae. Hildegard von Bingen in Portrait. Double DVD: BBC / OpusArte OA 0874 D (2003). Includes Hildegard, dramatised BBC documentary starring Patricia Routledge; A Real Mystic, interview and lecture with Professor Michael Fox; A Source of Inspiration, Washington National Cathedral documentary on her life and times; Illuminations, art gallery of her mystic visions with comments by Professor Michael Fox. Translation of Ordo Virtutum by Ansy Boothroyd and Michael Fields.

== See also ==
- Canticles of Ecstasy
