= Deutsche Harmonia Mundi =

German record label; subsidiary of Sony Classical Records

- Parent company: Sony Classical Records
- Founded: 1958; 68 years ago
- Genre: Classical music (Early and Baroque music)
- Country of origin: Germany
- Location: Freiburg im Breisgau
- Official website: www.sonyclassical.de

Deutsche Harmonia Mundi is a German classical music record label. It was founded in 1958 by Rudolf Ruby and based in Freiburg, Breisgau. The company was acquired by BMG Music in 1992 and is now part of Sony Music Entertainment. Ruby had Alfred Krings of West German Radio assemble their own house orchestra Collegium Aureum, founded 1964, to perform early music, selecting as leader Franzjosef Maier.

During the war Ruby had been imprisoned as a member of the Kreisau Circle of anti-Nazi resistance, and at a reunion in the 1960s he met fellow resistance member prince Joseph-Ernst Graf Fugger von Glött who invited him to use the Fugger castle, Schloss Fugger, in Kirchheim in Schwaben for his concerts and recordings. The connection with the Fugger family continued through the "Music of the Fuggers" recording made for DHM by Anthony Rooley.

Ruby had distribution deals with his friend Bernard Coutaz of Harmonia Mundi France, until first BASF, then briefly with EMI bought into the label in the late 1980s, before finally selling to BMG in 1992 and retiring in 1993. In his retirement Ruby later founded the smaller Ars Musici label, which was purchased in 2008 by Membran.
