= List of mountains and hills of the Taunus =

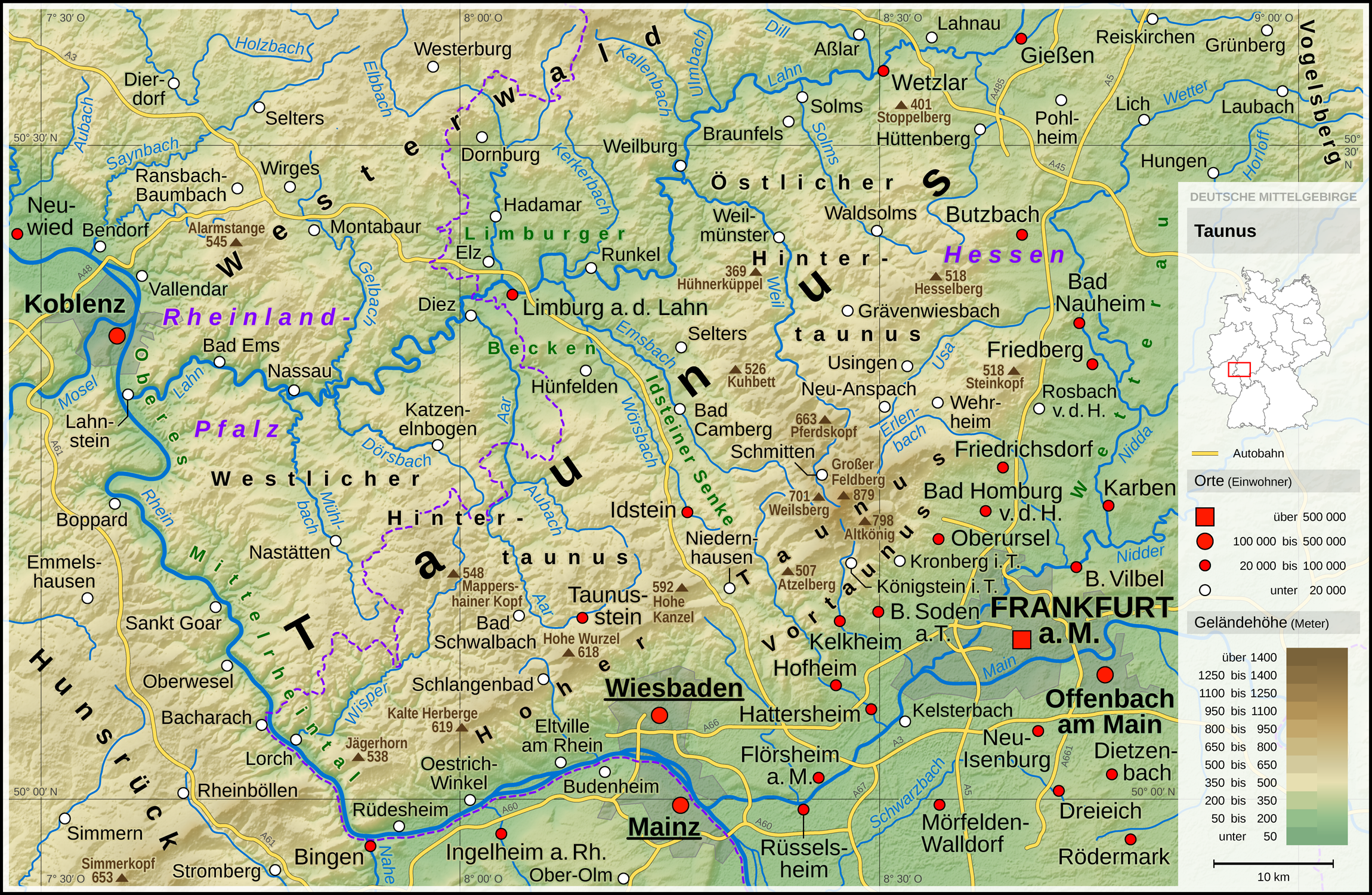
Topographic map of the Taunus

This list of mountains and hills of the Taunus contains a selection of the highest and most notable mountains and hills in the Taunus and its foothills in the German states of Hesse and Rhineland-Palatinate. The Taunus is part of the Rhenish Massif, part of the German Central Uplands, and has three nature parks: Taunus (formerly Hochtaunus), Nassau and Rhine-Taunus.

The mountains and hills in the table below are initially sorted by height in metres (m) above sea level (NHN) (source unless otherwise stated) The table may be resorted by any of five columns by clicking on the symbol at the top. In the column headed "Mountain or hill" alternative names are given in brackets, small text and italics. In this column, when there is more than one entry of the same name, they are distinguished by a place name.

The abbreviations used in the table are explained below.

| Mountain, hill, foothill | Height (m) | Natural region(s); Nature park(s) | Location Village(s) (near/between) | Rural/urban county/counties /independent towns (see below) | State (see below) | Comment(s), Place from... | Image |
|---|---|---|---|---|---|---|---|
| Großer Feldberg | 879 | High Taunus; Taunus NP | Niederreifenberg | HG | HE | Highest Berg in Taunus and Rheinischem Schiefergebirge; Großer Feldberg and Feldberg Transmission Site; near: UG-R Limes mit RMC Kleiner Feldberg | The Großer Feldberg seen from the Hintertaunus from the Niedgesbach valley |
| Kleiner Feldberg | 825,2 | High Taunus; Taunus NP | Falkenstein, Glashütten, Niederreifenberg | HG | HE | Taunus Observatory; near: UG-R Limes mit RMC Kleiner Feldberg | View from the viewing tower of the Großen Feldberg looking SW to the Kleinen Feldberg |
| Altkönig | 798,2 | High Taunus; Taunus NP | Falkenstein, Kronberg | HG | HE | Ringwall | View from the Frankfurt Road towards the Kronberg and the Altkönig |
| Weilsberg | 700,7 | Eastern Hintertaunus; Taunus NP | Niederreifenberg | HG | HE | Highest mountain in the eastern Hintertaunus | Weilsberg is on the right, on the left Kleiner Feldberg |
| Glaskopf | 686,8 | High Taunus; Taunus NP | Glashütten | HG | HE | | Glaskopf and Glashütten |
| Kolbenberg | 684,0 | High Taunus; Taunus NP | Oberursel | HG | HE | Transmission tower; near: UG-R Limes and RMC Altes Jagdhaus | Transmission tower of the Kolbenberg |
| Klingenkopf | 682,7 | High Taunus; Taunus NP | Bad Homburg vor der Höhe, Neu-Anspach | HG | HE | | Reconstructed foundations of the Klingenkopf Stone Tower |
| Dillenberg | 682,4 | Eastern Hintertaunus; Taunus NP | Oberreifenberg (Siegfriedsiedlung) | HG | HE | | Dillenberg above houses of Siegfriedsiedlung at the eastern end of Schmitten-Oberreiffenberg. |
| Sängelberg | 665,0 | Eastern Hintertaunus; Taunus NP | Arnoldshain, Oberreifenberg, Schmitten, Seelenberg | HG | HE | near: Castle Hattstein | Sängelberg above Oberreifenberg as seen from south-southeast |
| Pferdskopf | 662,6 | Eastern Hintertaunus; Taunus NP | Schmitten, Treisberg | HG | HE | viewing tower | View from the anderer Seite of the Weiltals of the Pferdskopf |
| Weißeberg | 660,2 | Eastern Hintertaunus; Taunus NP | Hegewiese | HG | HE | | |
| Krimmelberg | 639,7 | Eastern Hintertaunus; Taunus NP | Arnoldshain, Hegewiese, Oberreifenberg | HG | HE | | |
| Hühnerberg | 636,0 | Eastern Hintertaunus; Taunus NP | Oberems, Niederreifenberg | HG | HE | | |
| Junkernberg | 636,0 | Eastern Hintertaunus; Taunus NP | Arnoldshain, Hegewiese, Oberreifenberg | HG | HE | | Junkernberg on the left (on the right "Arnoldshainer Wiesenhang" ("Arnoldshain meadow slope") |
| Roßkopf | 635 bis 640 | High Taunus; Taunus NP | Dornholzhausen, Obernhain | HG | HE | UG-R Limes, Ringwall Roßkopf, Transmission mast | Taunus ridge and the Wehrheim village of Obernhain with the Roßkopf (centre right) |
| Weiße Mauer (Altkönig-Nk) | 634,0 | High Taunus; Taunus NP | Oberursel | HG | HE | Eiszeitliches quartzite-Feld | Weiße Mauer |
| Fauleberg | 633,4 | Eastern Hintertaunus; Taunus NP | Anspach, Arnoldshain, Hegewiese | HG | HE | | |
| Großer Eichwald | 633,2 | Eastern Hintertaunus; Taunus NP | Arnoldshain, Dorfweil, Hegewiese, Schmitten | HG | HE | | |
| Kieshübel (Roßkopf-Nk) | 632,8 | High Taunus; Taunus NP | Dornholzhausen, Obernhain | HG | HE | UG-R Limes | |
| Windhain | 629,3 | Eastern Hintertaunus; Rhine-Taunus NP | Seelenberg, Wüstems | HG, RÜD | HE | Highest point in Rheingau-Taunus-Kreis | Windhain above Wüstems' roofs; on the right in the back Großer Feldberg is visible |
| Mehlbusch | 625,7 | Eastern Hintertaunus; Taunus NP | Mauloff | HG | HE | Waldgebiet Mehlbusch; transmission mast | Mehlbusch as seen from the south near Wüstems |
| Eichkopf (Dornholzhausen) (Klingenkopf-Nk) | 620,2 | High Taunus; Taunus NP | Dornholzhausen, Neu-Anspach | HG | HE | UG-R Limes mit RMC Heidenstock | |
| Kalte Herberge | 619,3 | High Taunus; Rhine-Taunus NP | Hallgarten | RÜD | HE | Highest Berg of the Rheingau Hillss | View from the Bubenhäuser Höhe near Eltville nach Westen auf Hallgarter Zange, Kalte Herberge and Erbacher Kopf |
| Bremer Berg | 618,9 | Eastern Hintertaunus; Taunus NP | Mauloff | HG | HE | | |
| Hohe Wurzel | 617,9 | High Taunus; Rhine-Taunus NP | Seitzenhahn, Schlangenbad, Wambach | RÜD | HE | Transmission tower Hohe Wurzel | The Hohe Wurzel (with its TV tower) from the west, in the foreground is (in the valley) Wambach, in the foreground is Bärstadt, on the extreme left is the Großer Feldberg |
| Hollerkopf (Kieshübel-Nk) | 615,5 | High Taunus; Taunus NP | Dornholzhausen | HG | HE | | |
| Judenkopf | 613,8 | Eastern Hintertaunus; Taunus NP | Schmitten, Seelenberg | HG | HE | | Judenkopf above village Schmitten-Seelenberg as seen from Windhain mountain |
| Einsiedler (Roßkopf-Nk) | 606,6 | High Taunus; Taunus NP | Dornholzhausen, Neu-Anspach | HG | HE | UG-R Limes | |
| Pfaffenrod (Pfaffenberg) (s. a. Pfaffenkopf) | 596,2 | Eastern Hintertaunus; Taunus NP | Arnoldshain | HG | HE | | Pfaffenrod as seen from Pferdskopf observation tower |
| Feldkopf | 596,0 | Eastern Hintertaunus; Taunus NP | Schmitten | HG | HE | | |
| Klingenberg (s. a. Klingenkopf) | 595,9 | Eastern Hintertaunus; Taunus NP | Anspach, Hegewiese | HG | HE | | |
| Hohe Kanzel | 591,8 | High Taunus; Rhine-Taunus NP | Engenhahn, Königshofen, Naurod | RÜD, RÜD, WI | HE | | Summit monument on the Hoher Kanzel |
| Herzberg | 591,4 | High Taunus; Taunus NP | Dornholzhausen | HG | HE | AT Herzbergturm | View from the Bad Homburg of the Herzberg |
| Pfaffenkopf (s. a. Pfaffenrod) | 586,9 | Eastern Hintertaunus; Taunus NP | Mauloff | HG | HE | | Pfaffenkopf above village Waldems-Reichenbach as seen from Isberg mountain near Wüstems |
| Heckenberg | 584,0 | Eastern Hintertaunus; Taunus NP | Mauloff, Seelenberg | HG | HE | | |
| Biemerberg | 582,2 | Eastern Hintertaunus; Taunus NP | Anspach, Arnoldshain, Dorfweil | HG | HE | Biemerberg as seen from the west over Aubach | Biemerberg as seen over Aubach |
| Hallgarter Zange | 580,5 | High Taunus; Rhine-Taunus NP | Hallgarten | RÜD | HE | viewing tower and Ausflugslokal | View from the heights near Johannisberg looking east over the vineyards of Oestrich-Winkel and Schloss Vollrad and Hallgarter Zange |
| Erbacher Kopf | 579,8 | High Taunus; Rhine-Taunus NP | Hattenheim, Kiedrich | RÜD | HE | | Rheingau Hills and Erbacher Kopf |
| Langhals | 573,5 | Eastern Hintertaunus; Taunus NP | Anspach, Dorfweil | HG | HE | Langhals as seen from the southwest over Aubach | Langhals as seen from the southwest over Aubach |
| Steinkopf (Königstein) | 569,8 | High Taunus; Taunus NP | Königstein | HG | HE | | Steinkopf on the right as seen from southeast; Eichkopf mountain on the left |
| Eichkopf (Ruppertshain) | 563,3 | High Taunus; Taunus NP | Ruppertshain, Schloßborn | MTK, HG | HE | Highest Berg im Main-Taunus-Kreis | Eichkopf on the right in the middle ground as seen from Atzelberg |
| Breiteberg | 562,5 | Eastern Hintertaunus; Taunus NP | Mauloff, Riedelbach | HG | HE | | |
| Schellenberg | 554,3 | Eastern Hintertaunus; Taunus NP | Arnoldshain, Dorfweil, Schmitten | HG | HE | | Wiegefelsen on the Schellenberg |
| Mappershainer Kopf | 548,0 | Western Hintertaunus; Rhine-Taunus NP | Mappershain | RÜD | HE | Highest Berg in the westlichen Hintertaunus | Mappershainer Kopf (centre), in the foreground is Langschied |
| Dreibornsköpfe | 547,6 | High Taunus; Rhine-Taunus NP | Hausen v.d. Höhe | RÜD | HE | Ringwall Dreibornskopf | View from the der Großen Hub near Eltville am Rhein über die Bubenhäuser Höhe hinweg (mit dem Tempelchen) nordwestwärts zu den bewaldeten Dreibornsköpfen |
| Biegel | 547,4 | High Taunus; Rhine-Taunus NP | Bleidenstadt, Klarenthal | RÜD, WI | HE | | |
| Wolfsküppel | 545,1 | Eastern Hintertaunus; Taunus NP | Altweilnau, Finsternthal, Neuweilnau, Riedelbach, Treisberg | HG | HE | | View from the viewing tower of the Pferdskopf of the Wolsküppel (centre) and Dorf Riedelbach (left) |
| Grauer Kopf (Laufenselden) | 543,4 | Western Hintertaunus; Rhine-Taunus NP, Nassau NP | Berndroth, Grebenroth, Holzhausen, Laufenselden, Martenroth, Rettert | EMS, RÜD, EMS, RÜD, RÜD, EMS | RP, HE, RP, HE, HE, RP | UG-R Limes and Fort Holzhausen auf Nordwest- bis Nordhang; höchste Stelle (527 m) in the rheinland-pfälzischen Teil of the Taunus’ auf Nordwesthang | Grauer Kopf from the direction of Holzhausen an der Haide |
| Lindenberg | 541,3 | High Taunus; Taunus NP | Dornholzhausen | HG | HE | | |
| Romberg | 540,6 | High Taunus; Taunus NP | Königstein | HG | HE | | Romberg on the left (on the right side Königstein castle on its hill) |
| Rassel | 539,4 | High Taunus; Rhine-Taunus NP | Naurod, Rambach | WI | HE | | |
| Jägerhorn | 537,8 | High Taunus; Rhine-Taunus NP | Aulhausen, Presberg | RÜD | HE | | |
| Gesteinteheck | 537,2 | Western Hintertaunus; Rhine-Taunus NP | Egenroth, Laufenselden | RÜD | HE | | Kemeler Rücken and Gesteinteheck (left; behind the transmission mast on the Schönauer Küppel), Grauem Kopf (right) and houses of Laufenselden (foreground) |
| Eichelberg (Wehen) | 535,4 | High Taunus; Rhine-Taunus NP | Wehen, Wiesbaden | RÜD | HE | on the main ridge of the Taunus | |
| Neunzehntberg | 530 | Western Hintertaunus; Rhine-Taunus NP | Bad Schwalbach, Fischbach | RÜD | HE | | Neunzehnberg, left summit, foreground the deeply incised valley of the Fischbach |
| Kuhbett | 525,6 | Eastern Hintertaunus; Taunus NP | Hasselbach, Schwickershausen | HG, LM | HE | near: Eichelbacher Hof (Manor House) | Kuhbett in the eastern Hintertaunus |
| Bienkopf | 521,9 | Western Hintertaunus; Rhine-Taunus NP | Bärstadt, Fischbach, Wambach | RÜD | HE | | |
| Steinhaufen | 520,6 | High Taunus; Rhine-Taunus NP | Wehen, Wiesbaden | RÜD, WI | HE | near: Platte Hunting Lodge | |
| Hesselberg (Bodenrod) | 518 | Eastern Hintertaunus; Taunus NP | Bodenrod | FB | HE | | View from the Hausbergturm of the Hesselberg |
| Steinkopf (Ober-Rosbach) | 518,0 | High Taunus; Taunus NP | Ober-Rosbach | FB | HE | Transmission tower Steinkopf | View from the Karben of the Steinkopf and transmission tower |
| Grauer Kopf (Zorn) | 517,9 | Western Hintertaunus; Rhine-Taunus NP | Zorn | RÜD | HE | transmission mast | View from the Nordwesten near Niedermeilingen über Obermeilingen of the Grauen Kopf |
| Nickel | 517,3 | High Taunus; Rhine-Taunus NP | Lenzhahn, Oberjosbach | RÜD | HE | | |
| Rossert | 515,9 | Anterior Taunus; Taunus NP | Eppenhain | MTK | HE | NSG and FFH-Gebiet; Rossert-Hainkopf-Dachsbau | Rossert and nameless hilltop, on the right Atzelberg with network tower (seen from the east) |
| Dachskopf (Steinkopf-Nk) (s. a. Dachsköpfe) | 512,6 | High Taunus; Taunus NP | Ockstadt | FB | HE | | |
| Stückelberg | 509,7 | Eastern Hintertaunus; Taunus NP | Dombach | LM | HE | | Stückelberg in the eastern Hintertaunus, in the foreground is Dombach |
| Atzelberg | 506,7 | High Taunus; Taunus NP | Ruppertshain | MTK | HE | Transmission tower, AT Atzelbergturm | View from the einer heights in Eppstein of the Atzelberg and Transmission tower and Eppenhain |
| Gickel (Hesselberg-Nk) (s. a. Gickelsburg) | 505,1 | Eastern Hintertaunus; Taunus NP | Bodenrod | FB | HE | | Gickel vom Hausbergturm |
| Hundskopf | 503,8 | Western Hintertaunus; Rhine-Taunus NP | Bärstadt, Fischbach | RÜD | HE | | |
| Galgenkopf | 504,2 | Western Hintertaunus; Rhine-Taunus NP | Heimbach, Kemel, Lindschied | RÜD | HE | | |
| Hirschberg | 504,0 | Eastern Hintertaunus; Taunus NP | Hunoldstal, Merzhausen | HG | HE | | |
| Hardt | 502,4 | Eastern Hintertaunus; Taunus NP | Brombach, Dorfweil, Neu-Anspach | HG | HE | | |
| Altenstein | 500,6 | High Taunus; Rhine-Taunus NP | Hahn | RÜD | HE | ND Altenstein, ND Spitzenstein, Ringwall | |
| Heidekopf (Nk vom Erbacher Kopf) | 500 | High Taunus; Rhine-Taunus NP | Hattenheim, Kiedrich | RÜD | HE | | |
| Burghain (Falkenstein) | 498,7 | Anterior Taunus; Taunus NP | Falkenstein, Königstein | HG | HE | Falkenstein Castle | Burghain Falkenstein (view from Altkönig-viewpoint Lips-Tempelthe der Burg Eppstein of the Castle Königstein and Castle Falkenstein in the Hintergrund |
| Großer Lindenkopf | 498,7 | High Taunus; Rhine-Taunus NP, Eichelberger Mark | Oberjosbach | RÜD | HE | Highest Berg der Eichelberger Mark | |
| Hansenkopf | 495,0 | High Taunus; Rhine-Taunus NP | Schlangenbad | RÜD | HE | | Vorne Rauenthal, in der Mitte der Hansenkopf |
| Buchwaldskopf | 492 | High Taunus; Rhine-Taunus NP, Eichelberger Mark | Oberjosbach | RÜD | HE | | |
| Goldgrube | 492,0 | High Taunus; Taunus NP | Oberursel | HG | HE | near: Heidetränk-Oppidum | Goldgrubenfelsen von Südwesten |
| Hainbuchenkopf | 492 | Eastern Hintertaunus; Taunus NP | Bodenrod, Espa, Weiperfelden | FB, GI, LDK | HE | | |
| Hinterster Kopf | 491,1 | Eastern Hintertaunus; Taunus NP | Bodenrod, Espa, Weiperfelden | FB, GI, LDK | HE | | |
| Galgenkopf | 490,9 | Western Hintertaunus; Rhine-Taunus NP | Bärstadt | RÜD | HE | | |
| Kopf | 490,5 | High Taunus; Rhine-Taunus NP | Bärstadt, Schlangenbad, Wambach | RÜD | HE | | |
| Zorner Kopf | 487,9 | Western Hintertaunus | Strüth, Welterod | EMS | RP | | |
| Galgenküppel | 486,8 | Western Hintertaunus | Strüth, Weidenbach | EMS | RP | | |
| Hausberg | 485,7 | Eastern Hintertaunus; Taunus NP | Espa, Hausen-Oes, Hoch-Weisel | GI, FB, FB | HE | AT Hausbergturm, Ringwall-Anlagen | View from the Süden of the Hausberg |
| Donnerskopf (Doko) | 485,2 | Eastern Hintertaunus; Taunus NP | Bodenrod | FB | HE | Warnamt VI. (derzeit VCP-Zentrum) | |
| Hopfenstein | 485,0 | Western Hintertaunus; Rhine-Taunus NP | Orlen, Wingsbach | RÜD | HE | | |
| Nesselberg | 485,0 | Eastern Hintertaunus; Taunus NP | Brombach, Hunoldstal, Rod am Berg | HG | HE | | |
| Ziegenkopf | 485,0 | Western Hintertaunus | Welterod | EMS | RP | | |
| Saukopf | 485 | High Taunus | Ober-Rosbach | FB | HE | near: RMC Kapersburg (KD) | |
| Winterstein (Steinkopf-Nk) | 482,3 | High Taunus; Taunus NP | Friedrichsthal, Ober-Mörlen, Ober-Rosbach, Ockstadt | HG, FB, FB, FB | HE | AT Wintersteinturm (Plattformhöhe 498,41 m) | |
| Maisel | 482,2 | Eastern Hintertaunus; Taunus NP | Glashütten | HG | HE | Wohngebiet von Glashütten; near: UG-R Limes mit RMC Maisel | |
| Bleibeskopf | 480,1 | High Taunus; Taunus NP | Dornholzhausen | HG | HE | Ringwall Bleibeskopf | Obere Felsgruppe am Bleibeskopf |
| Hohler Stein | 479 | High Taunus; Rhine-Taunus NP | Oberseelbach, Niedernhausen, Niederseelbach, Oberjosbach | RÜD | HE | ND Felsen aus quartzite | |
| Gaulskopf (Espa) | 474,0 | Eastern Hintertaunus; Taunus NP | Espa | GI | HE | | View from the viewing tower of the Hausberg of the Gaulskopf. Espa is in the foreground |
| Kellerskopf | 474,0 | High Taunus; Rhine-Taunus NP | Naurod | WI | HE | viewing tower | Kellerskopf and viewing tower |
| Hahnkopf | 473,6 | Western Hintertaunus; Rhine-Taunus NP | Dickschied, Springen | RÜD | HE | | |
| Scheid (Ehrenbach) | 471,9 | Western Hintertaunus; Rhine-Taunus NP | Ehrenbach, Oberlibbach | RÜD | HE | | |
| Gickelsburg (Gickelsberg) (s. a. Gickel) | 470,9 | High Taunus; Taunus NP | Friedrichsdorf | HG | HE | Ringwall; near: RMC Saalburg | View from the Bottigtal near Friedrichsdorf of the Gickelsburg (rear) and of the Hesselberg (foreground) |
| Galgenkopf | 470,3 | Western Hintertaunus; Rhine-Taunus NP | Hilgenroth, Nauroth, Dickschied | RÜD | HE | | |
| Wachtküppel | 468,5 | Western Hintertaunus; Rhine-Taunus NP | Born, Watzhahn | RÜD | HE | | |
| Unnerküppel | 468,4 | Western Hintertaunus | Lipporn, Rettershain | EMS | RP | | |
| Kirschenhell | 466,6 | Eastern Hintertaunus; Taunus NP | Altweilnau, Neuweilnau, Oberlauken | HG | HE | | |
| Rabenkopf | 466,2 | Western Hintertaunus; Rhine-Taunus NP | Obergladbach | RÜD | HE | | |
| Heißer Kopf | 465,2 | Eastern Hintertaunus; Rhine-Taunus NP; Taunus NP | Oberrod, Wüstems | RÜD | HE | | Heißer Kopf as seen from northeast |
| Salzlackerkopf | 465,0 | Eastern Hintertaunus; Taunus NP | Dombach | LM | HE | | |
| Butznickel (Hageschlösschen) | 462,2 | High Taunus; Taunus NP | Ehlhalten, Schloßborn | MTK, HG | HE | stattliche Felsformationen, Hausberg von Schloßborn, near: Rentmauer Dattenberg | Butznickel as seen from northeast |
| Suterkopf | 461,8 | Eastern Hintertaunus; Taunus NP | Haintchen, Hasselbach | LM, HG | HE | | Teilansicht von Norden auf das Plateau of the Suterkopf |
| Hesselberg (Friedrichsdorf) | 461,0 | High Taunus; Taunus NP | Friedrichsdorf | HG | HE | | |
| Sommerberg | 460,8 | Eastern Hintertaunus; Taunus NP | Dombach, Riedelbach | LM, HG | HE | | View from the Dombachtal past an unnamed summit (492 m; centre) to the Sommerberg (right) |
| Koberg | 460,5 | Eastern Hintertaunus; Taunus NP | Haintchen | LM | HE | | The Koberg (right), and Haintchen |
| Burg (Burg Reichenbach) | 459,1 | Eastern Hintertaunus; Rhine-Taunus NP | Niederems, Reichenbach, Wüstems | RÜD | HE | Ringwall Waldems | --> |
| Schönauer Küppel | 459,0 | Western Hintertaunus; Rhine-Taunus NP | Laufenselden | RÜD | HE | Sendeturm | |
| Hohe Schneid | 457,4 | Eastern Hintertaunus; Taunus NP | Hundstadt, Eschbach | HG | HE | | |
| Dachsköpfe; Kleiner Dachskopf: Großer Dachskopf: (s. a. Dachskopf) | 456,6 > 442,5; 456,6 | Western Hintertaunus | Dahlheim, Dachsenhausen, Osterspai | EMS | RP | | Dachsköpfe (Großer and Kleiner Dachskopf; centre); Hoher Wald (right); and Winterwerb (left) and Miehlen (foreground) |
| Weißler Höhe (Weißlerhöhe) | 456,2 | Western Hintertaunus; Nassau NP | Niedertiefenbach, Oberfischbach | EMS | RP | Ringwall Weißler Höhe | Blick from the direction of Obertiefenbach über das Hasenbachtal ostnordostwärts of the Weißler Höhe (rear); rechts am Ringmauerhang der Obertiefenbacher Weiler Spriestersbach |
| Womberg | 455,7 | Eastern Hintertaunus; Taunus NP | Cratzenbach | HG | HE | | |
| Graueberg | 455,6 | High Taunus; Taunus NP | Köppern, Wehrheim | HG | HE | | Taunus-quartzitewerk unterhalb of the Graueberg |
| Vogelskipfel | 455,2 | Eastern Hintertaunus; Rhine-Taunus NP | Reichenbach, Reinborn, Steinfischbach | RÜD | HE | | |
| Tannenkopf | 455,1 | Eastern Hintertaunus; Taunus NP | Hasselbach | HG | HE | | |
| Schläferskopf | 454,2 | High Taunus; Rhine-Taunus NP | Klarenthal | WI | HE | AT Kaiser-Wilhelm-Turm | Kaiser-Wilhelm-Turm of the Schläferskopf |
| Altkolum | 453,9 | Eastern Hintertaunus; Taunus NP | Altweilnau, Oberlauken | HG | HE | | |
| Staufen | 451,0 | Anterior Taunus; Taunus NP | Kelkheim, Eppstein | MTK | HE | Kaisertempel | Staufen above Fischbach |
| Wellenberg | 450,5 | High Taunus | Ober-Rosbach | FB | HE | | |
| Schorn | 450 | Eastern Hintertaunus; Taunus NP | Cleeberg, Espa, Weiperfelden | GI, GI, LDK | HE | | |
| Spitzeberg | 449,9 | High Taunus; Taunus NP | Ehlhalten | MTK | HE | | Spiteberg above village Ehlhalten; Glashütten is on the left in the back |
| Ringmauer | 448,9 | Western Hintertaunus; Nassau NP | Oberfischbach, Obertiefenbach | EMS | RP | Ringwall Ringmauer | Die Ringmauer and Obertiefenbach (foreground) and dessen Weiler Hof Spriestersbach (centre left) |
| Hahnberg | 446,6 | High Taunus; Rhine-Taunus NP | Königshofen, Niedernhausen, Naurod | RÜD | HE | S: Aubach; Q: Läusbach; Q: Wickerbach | |
| Bernsterkopf | 445,2 | Western Hintertaunus; Rhine-Taunus NP | Huppert, Laufenselden | RÜD | HE | | |
| Wehrholz | 443,4 | Western Hintertaunus; Nassau NP | Rettert, Holzhausen an der Haide | EMS | RP | | Wehrholz, von Holzhausen an der Haide (Südwesten) |
| Risselstein | 441,8 | Western Hintertaunus; Rhine-Taunus NP | Bleidenstadt, Taunusstein, Watzhahn | RÜD | HE | | |
| Hoher Wald (Hohenwald) | 441,1 | Western Hintertaunus | Dachsenhausen, Oberbachheim, Winterwerb | EMS | RP | | Hoher Wald (right) and Dachsköpfe (centre); and Winterwerb (left) and Miehlen (foreground) |
| Bornberg | 441,0 | Eastern Hintertaunus; Taunus NP | Neuweilnau, Riedelbach | HG | HE | | |
| Renzenberg | 439,9 | Eastern Hintertaunus; Taunus NP | Merzhausen, Oberlauken | HG | HE | | |
| Gierauer Berg | 438,6 | Eastern Hintertaunus; Taunus NP | Hundstadt | HG | HE | | |
| Hohes Rech | 436,3 | Western Hintertaunus; Rhine-Taunus NP | Adolfseck, Born | RÜD | HE | | |
| Gaulskopf (Friedrichsdorf) | 434,3 | High Taunus; Taunus NP | Friedrichsdorf | HG | HE | | |
| Küppel | 433,8 | High Taunus; Taunus NP, Rhine-Taunus NP | Ehlhalten, Oberjosbach, Niederjosbach | MTK, RÜD, MTK | HE | also known as Hammersberg | Küppel as seen from Atzelberg |
| Dinkelstein | 432,3 | Eastern Hintertaunus; Rhine-Taunus NP | Esch, Niederems | RÜD | HE | | |
| Burgberg (Königstein) | 431,2 | Anterior Taunus; Taunus NP | Königstein | HG | HE | Castle Königstein | Königstein in the Taunus and Burgberg and Castle Königstein (ca. 1890–1900) |
| Geierskopf | 429,3 | Western Hintertaunus; Rhine-Taunus NP | Kesselbach | RÜD | HE | | |
| Breisterberg | 427,5 | Western Hintertaunus; Rhine-Taunus NP | Görsroth | RÜD | HE | | |
| Eichelberg (Strüth) | 426,1 | Western Hintertaunus | Strüth | EMS | RP | | |
| Oberhorst | 424,9 | Western Hintertaunus; Nassau NP | Hinterwald, Schweighausen | EMS | RP | | |
| Köhlerberg | 424,7 | Eastern Hintertaunus; Taunus NP | Cleeberg, Griedelbach, Oberwetz | GI, LDK, LDK | HE | | Plateau of the Köhlerbergs von Nordwesten gesehen |
| Brüler Berg | 424,2 | Eastern Hintertaunus; Taunus NP | Bodenrod, Münster, Hoch-Weisel, Espa, Weiperfelden | FB, FB, FB, GI, LDK | HE | KD Ringwall | |
| Milsenberg | 421,8 | Eastern Hintertaunus; Taunus NP | Hasselbach | HG | HE | | |
| Heinborn (Hainborn) | 420,8 | Western Hintertaunus; Nassau NP | Dachsenhausen, Hinterwald in Braubach | EMS | RP | | |
| Ergenstein | 419,7 | Western Hintertaunus | Schönborn | EMS | RP | | Ergenstein (Mitte) aus Süden vom Kemeler Rücken near Kemel; and Windrad near Berghausen and Westerwald (Horizont) |
| Heiligenwald | 415,8 | Eastern Hintertaunus; Taunus NP | Dietenhausen | LM | HE | | |
| Wolfsbusch | 415,6 | Western Hintertaunus; Nassau NP | Becheln | EMS | RP | | |
| Hoheberg | 413,8 | Eastern Hintertaunus; Taunus NP | Eschbach, Usingen, Wilhelmsdorf | HG | HE | | |
| Pfingstberg | 412,3 | Eastern Hintertaunus; Taunus NP | Gemünden, Rod an der Weil, Oberlauken, Niederlauken | HG | HE | | |
| Hühnerberg | 410,4 | Western Hintertaunus; Taunus Nature Park | Limbach, Wallbach | RÜD | HE | | |
| Judenkopf | 410,0 | Anterior Taunus; Rhine-Taunus NP | Hofheim, Lorsbach | MTK | HE | | Judenkopf as seen from viewpoint Kaisertempel above Eppstein |
| Hardtberg | 408,7 | Anterior Taunus; Taunus NP | Königstein, Mammolshain | HG | HE | AT Hardtbergturm | Hardtbergturm of the Hardtberg |
| Galgenkopf | 408,5 | Eastern Hintertaunus; Taunus NP | Niederlauken, Wilhelmsdorf | HG | HE | | |
| Scheid (Emmershausen) | 407,7 | Eastern Hintertaunus; Taunus NP | Emmershausen | HG | HE | | |
| Neuborn | 404,4 | Eastern Hintertaunus; Taunus NP | Merzhausen, Wilhelmsdorf | HG | HE | | |
| Heidenkopf | 404,1 | Eastern Hintertaunus; Taunus NP | Dietenhausen | LM | HE | | |
| Rotenberg | 402 | Western Hintertaunus; Rhine-Taunus NP | Burg-Hohenstein, Holzhausen ü. Aar | RÜD | HE | | |
| Stoppelberg | 401,2 | Eastern Hintertaunus; Taunus NP | Wetzlar | LDK | HE | Highest Berg Wetzlars | Stoppelberg and Sendeturm |
| Sandkopf | 400,7 | Western Hintertaunus; Nassau NP | Berghausen, Mudershausen | EMS | RP | | |
| Pinnköppel | 399,6 | Eastern Hintertaunus; Taunus NP | Laubach, Naunstadt | HG | HE | | |
| Horstberg | 397,9 | Western Hintertaunus | Auel, Bogel | EMS | RP | | |
| Eichelberg (Weilrod) | 397,1 | Eastern Hintertaunus; Taunus NP | Rod an der Weil | HG | HE | | |
| Gaulskopf (Langenhain-Ziegenberg) | 396,8 | Eastern Hintertaunus; Taunus NP | Langenhain-Ziegenberg, Friedrichsthal | HG, FB | HE | UG-R Limes, RMC Kaisergrube, Römerturm | Römerturm of the Gaulskopf |
| Steinmann | 396,4 | Western Hintertaunus; Rhine-Taunus NP | Görsroth, Wallbach | RÜD | HE | | |
| Vier Hahnen | 395,7 | Western Hintertaunus; Rhine-Taunus NP | Limbach, Panrod | RÜD | HE | | |
| Eichkopf (Wernborn) | 394,8 | Eastern Hintertaunus; Taunus NP | Eschbach, Wernborn | HG | HE | | |
| Isberg | 394,1 | Eastern Hintertaunus; Rhine-Taunus NP | Niederems, Wüstems | RÜD | HE | | Isberg as seen from east-northeast |
| Galgenberg (Wehrheim) | 390,8 | Eastern Hintertaunus; Taunus NP | Wehrheim | HG | HE | | |
| Heidelbeerberg (Schrenzer) | 384,9 | Eastern Hintertaunus; Taunus NP | Butzbach, Ebersgöns, Hausen-Oes | FB | HE | | |
| Kirchküppel | 384,4 | Eastern Hintertaunus; Taunus NP | Haintchen, Emmershausen | LM | HE | | |
| Spießberg | 382,7 | Eastern Hintertaunus; Taunus NP | Mönstadt | HG | HE | | |
| Ohlandsburg | 380,3 | Eastern Hintertaunus; Taunus NP | Eisenbach, Schwickershausen | LM | HE | abgegangene Höhenburg, Wallanlage | |
| Rote Küppel | 377,9 | Eastern Hintertaunus; Taunus NP | Wolfenhausen, Langhecke | LM | HE | | Roter Küppel (centre), rechts Wolfenhausen in the oberen Laubusbachtal |
| Dreispitz | 377,8 | Western Hintertaunus; Nassau NP | Dahlheim, Kamp-Bornhofen | EMS | RP | | |
| Hünerberg | 375,0 | Anterior Taunus; Taunus NP | Kronberg, Oberhöchstadt, Schönberg | HG | HE | KD Ringwall Hünerberg, Siedlungsspuren | |
| Beuerbacher Kopf | 371,3 | Western Hintertaunus; Rhine-Taunus NP | Bechtheim, Wallbach, Wallrabenstein | RÜD | HE | | |
| Hühnerküppel | 369,3 | Eastern Hintertaunus; Taunus NP | Langenbach, Laubuseschbach, Rohnstadt | LM | HE | Spuren keltischer Besiedlung | View from the Süden of the Hühnerküppel |
| Cleebaum | 367,6 | Eastern Hintertaunus; Taunus NP | Cleeberg | GI | HE | | |
| Großer Gübel | 360,4 | Western Hintertaunus; Nassau NP | Rullsbach, Lahnstein, Sulzbach | EMS | RP | | |
| Galgenkopf | 358,6 | Western Hintertaunus | Reitzenhain | EMS | RP | | |
| Eichelberg (Lohrheim) | 355,4 | Western Hintertaunus | Lohrheim | EMS | RP | | |
| Schalsberg | 352,6 | Eastern Hintertaunus; Taunus NP | Oberkleen, Vollnkirchen | GI | HE | | |
| Hasseln | 349,9 | Western Hintertaunus; Nassau NP | Oberwies, Schweighausen | EMS | RP | | |
| Grauenstein | 349,2 | Eastern Hintertaunus; Taunus NP | Bermbach, Laimbach | LM | HE | | |
| Schaarheck | 340 | Western Hintertaunus | Gemmerich, Hainau | EMS | RP | | |
| Hollandskopf | 339,1 | Eastern Hintertaunus; Taunus NP | Laimbach, Altenkirchen | LM, LDK | HE | | |
| Gebrannter Berg | 337,0 | Eastern Hintertaunus; Rhine-Taunus NP | Wallbach, Wallrabenstein, Wördsdorf | RÜD | HE | | |
| Korbacher Kopf | 331 | Western Hintertaunus; Nassau NP | Bergnassau, Singhofen | EMS | RP | | |
| Stollberg | 326,4 | Eastern Hintertaunus; Taunus NP | Aulenhausen, Rohnstadt, Weilmünster | LM | HE | | |
| Kanzel | 325,9 | Eastern Hintertaunus; Taunus NP | Altenkirchen; Neukirchen | LDK | HE | | |
| Galgenberg (Ohren) | 322,4 | Western Hintertaunus | Kirberg, Ohren | LM | HE | | |
| Steinkopf (Bad Camberg) | 317,0 | Western Hintertaunus | Bad Camberg, Beuerbach | LM | HE | | |
| Brühlberg | 316,3 | Eastern Hintertaunus; Taunus NP | Bonbaden, Philippstein | LDK | HE | | |
| Mensfelder Kopf | 313,7 | Limburger Becken | Mensfelden | LM | HE | Aussichtspunkt über das Limburger Becken, Haupttaunusanhöhe aus Blickrichtung Limburg, NSG Mensfelder Kopf | View over the Plateau of the Mensfelder Kopf looking west |
| Galgenkopf | 302,6 | Eastern Hintertaunus; Taunus NP | Usingen | HG | HE | | |
| Kapellenberg | 292,0 | Anterior Taunus; Taunus NP | Hofheim | MTK | HE | AT Meisterturm | |
| Holzberg | 280 | Eastern Hintertaunus; Taunus NP | Friedrichsthal, Kransberg, Ziegenberg, Wernborn | HG, HG, FB, HG | HE | Ringwall Holzburg, Marienkapelle | Marienkapelle of the Holzberg |
| Bubenhäuser Höhe | 267,6 | Anterior Taunus; Rhine-Taunus NP | Eltville am Rhein, Martinsthal, Rauenthal | RÜD | HE | Aussichtsberg and Rundumsicht | View from the der Großen Hub near Eltville am Rhein nordwestwärts of the Bubenhäuser Höhe (mit dem Tempelchen); in the Hintergrund die bewaldeten Dreibornsköpfe |
| Johannisberg | 264,84 | High Taunus; Wetterau | Bad Nauheim | FB | HE | Volkssternwarte Wetterau | |
| Kehrerberg (Kanzel) | 260,1 | Western Hintertaunus; Nassau NP | Obernhof, Seelbach | EMS | RP | | |
| Galgenkopf | 258,9 | High Taunus | Ockstadt | FB | HE | | |
| Neroberg | 245,0 | Anterior Taunus; Rhine-Taunus NP | Wiesbaden | WI | HE | Bergpark, Kletterwald, Nerobergbahn, Opelbad, Russian Orthodox Church | Aerial photo: Neroberg and Opelbad, Russian-Orthodox church and the houses of Wiesbaden in the foreground |
| Galgenberg (Ostheim in Butzbach) | 232,8 | Wetterau | Fauerbach v. d. Höhe, Ober-Mörlen, Ostheim | FB | HE | | |

== Abkürzungen ==
Die in der Tabelle verwendeten Abkürzungen (alphabetisch sortiert) bedeuten:

County abbreviations:

- HG = Hochtaunuskreis
- LDK = Lahn-Dill-Kreis
- LM = Limburg-Weilburg
- RÜD = Rheingau-Taunus-Kreis
- MTK = Main-Taunus-Kreis
- EMS = Rhein-Lahn-Kreis
- FB = Wetteraukreis

Independent city and town abbreviations:

- GI = Gießen
- WI = Wiesbaden

German state abbreviations (ISO 3166-2):

- HE = Hesse
- RP = Rhineland-Palatinate

Sonstiges:

- > = "greater than" symbol (here: used where the actual height is probably higher than that given)
- AT = viewing tower
- FFH = Fauna-Flora habitat region
- KD = Cultural monument
- ND = Natural monument
- Nk = Subpeak
- NP = Nature park
- NSG = Nature reserve
- UG-R Limes = Upper Germanic-Rhaetian Limes (ORL)
- RMC = Römerkastell = Roman military camp
- VCP = Verband Christlicher Pfadfinderinnen und Pfadfinder
- s. a. = see also

== See also ==
- List of mountains and hills of the Rhenish Massif
- List of mountains and hills of Hesse
- List of mountains and hills of Rhineland-Palatinate
