= Rheingau Hills =

German mountains

Coordinates: 50.054817°N 8.002456°E

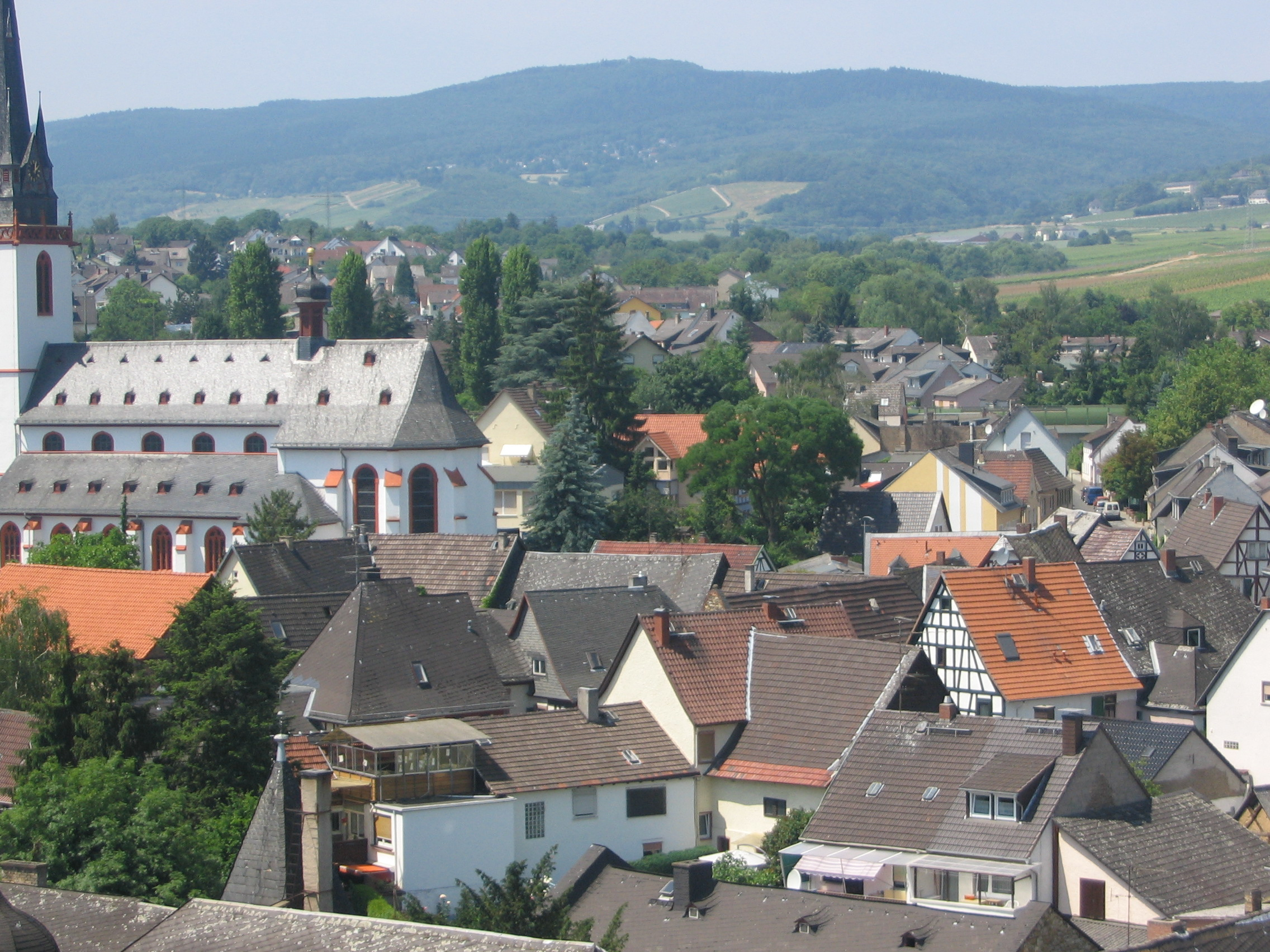
View of the Rheingau mountains from Erbach

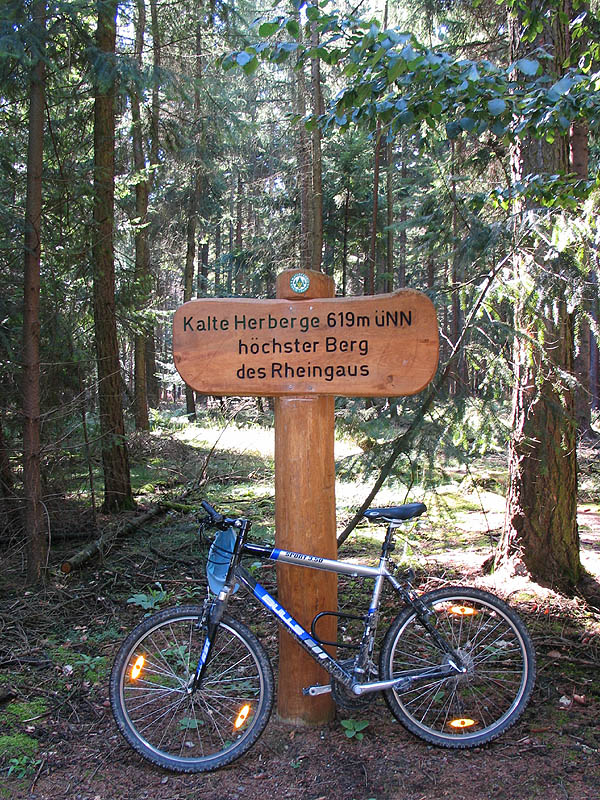
Summit cross on the Kalter Herberge

The Rheingau Mountains or Rheingau Hills form the westernmost section of the High Taunus and extend for 20 kilometres in a south-west to north-east direction between the Rhine valley near Lorch and Assmannshausen in the west and the Walluf valley near Schlangenbad in the east. The highest point is the 619-metre-high mountain of Kalte Herberge. The Rheinhöhenweg Trail on the right bank of the Rhine runs along the ridgeline of the mountains which are part of the main crest of the Taunus.

== Location and surroundings ==
The Rheingau Mountains are part of the Rheingau region and lie within the county of Rheingau-Taunus-Kreis. The centre of the Rheingau Mountains is formed by the ridge line from the Kalter Herberge to the 580p-metre-high Erbacher Kopf. There is no point in four kilometres that is lower than 560 metres. About one kilometre southeast of the Kalter Herberge, and thus in front of the ridge line, the Hallgarter Zange also reaches a height of 580 meters. Here is a highly visible observation tower, which has been accessible again since the opening of an adventure park in 2015. Due to its south-facing location, the Hallgarter Zange appears from the Rhine as the highest elevation and partially covers the Kalte Herberge.

To the south, the Rheingau Mountains drop steeply down to the vineyards of the Rheingau. To the north, it is adjoined by the wooded valleys of the Wisper valley, such as the Äpfelbachtal and the Ernstbach valley nestling in the unpopulated area of hinterland forest.

North of the summit ridge runs the Rheingau Gebück, the historical Rheingau Landwehr.
