= Stüeckelberg =

Stüeckelberg may refer to:

- Ernst Carl Gerlach Stueckelberg - Swiss theoretical physicist
  - topics named after him:
  - Stueckelberg action
  - Stuckelberg diagrams
  - Stückelberg–Feynman interpretation
  - Stueckelberg formalism
- Stückelberg (Taunus), a mountain in Hesse, Germany.
