= Hohe Wurzel (Taunus) =

Mountain in Hesse, Germany

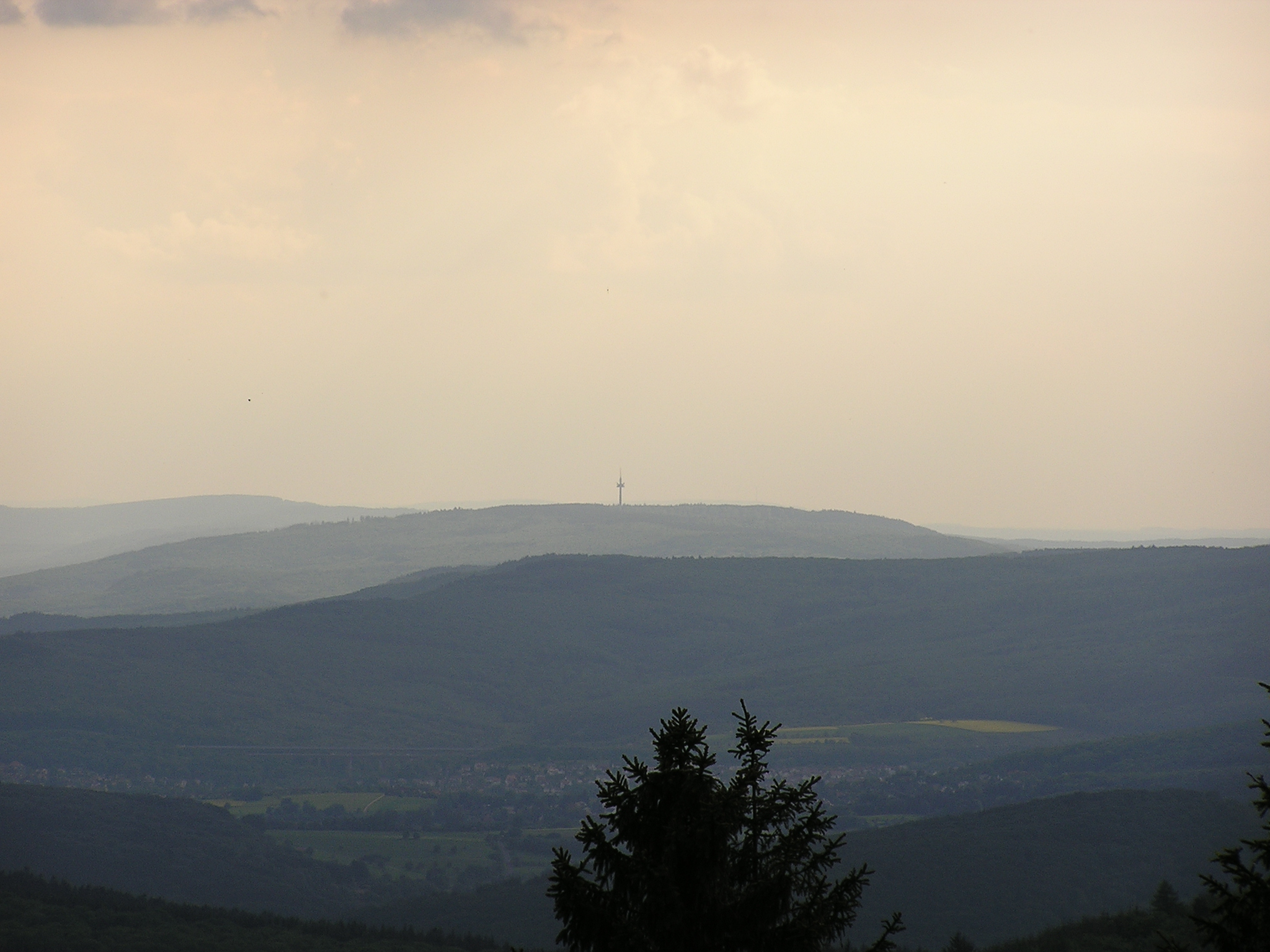
- Hohe Wurzel seen from the Altkönig

Highest point
- Elevation: 617.9 m (2,027 ft)
- Prominence: 173 m (568 ft)
- Isolation: 11 km → Kalte Herberge
- Coordinates: 50°06′31″N 8°08′00″E

Geography
- Location within Hesse
- Location: Hesse, Germany

Hohe Wurzel, at 618 m, is the highest peak in the Rheingau-Taunus-Kreis mountain range and the 2nd highest mountain near Wiesbaden, Hesse, Germany. A 133 m reinforced concrete telecommunications tower is located on the peak, which supplies the Rhine Main area and other locations with digital television service as well as DAB and FM sound broadcasts.

In 1883, the Gustav Vietor Tower was built on the peak. It was last used for amateur radio purposes. The tower was demolished in March 2006.

Hohe Wurzel is located in the Rhine-Taunus Nature Park.
