= Neeff's wheel =

Neeff's wheel, also known as the Blitzrad (German: "lightning wheel" or "spark wheel") is a historical electrical apparatus. It is a kind of contact breaker, designed to interrupt an electrical circuit at periodic intervals, producing visible sparks. It was first presented in the 1830s by the German scientist Christian Ernst Neeff (1782–1849).

The arrangement consists of a toothed wheel against which a conductive wire is pressed (by a spring something like that of a mousetrap). Electrical current flows through the wheel into the wire. When the gear wheel is turned, each tooth of the gear causes the wire to ride up and then briefly drop down, losing contact with the wheel and generating a spark. The gear wheel can be driven by a hand crank.

Instead of air, the gaps between the teeth of the gear wheel may be filled with a solid electrical insulator such as ebony wood. Neeff credited this innovation to his colleague Johann Philipp Wagner.

Neeff's wheel was a forerunner of the modern contact breaker.
