= Hesselberg (Butzbach) =

Coordinates: 50°24′01″N 8°34′08″E

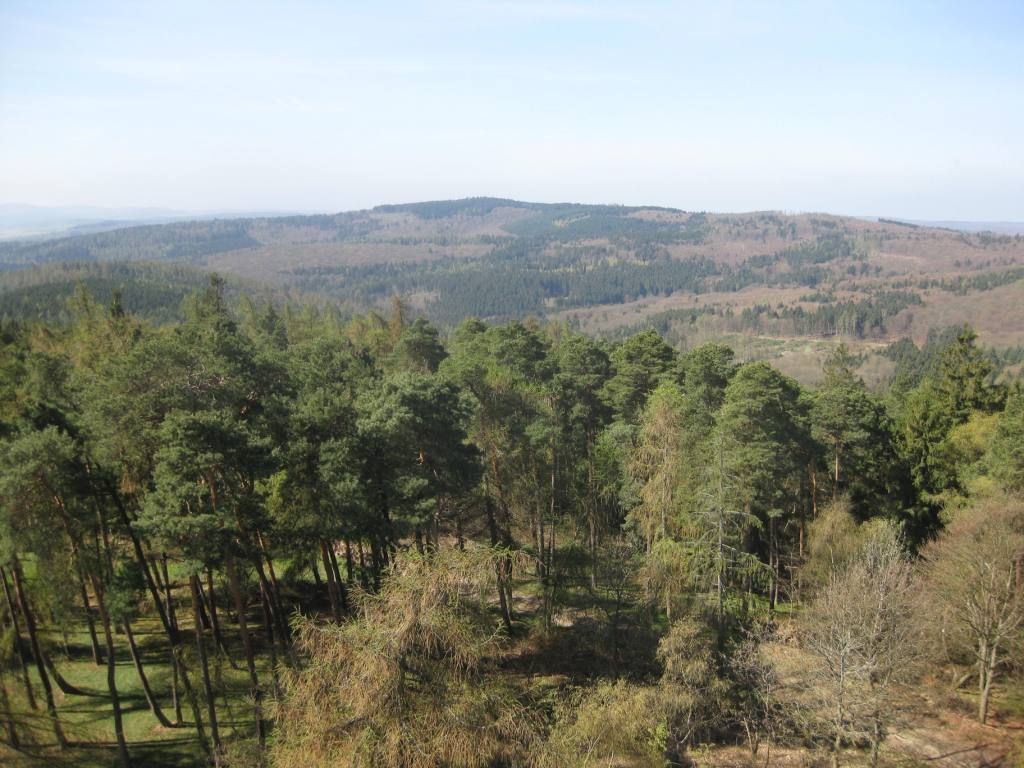
- View of Hesselberg

Highest point
- Elevation: 518 m (1,699 ft)

Geography
- Location: Near Bodenrod in Wetteraukreis, Hesse, Germany
- Parent range: Taunus

Hesselberg is a hill located in the Taunus mountain range in the Wetteraukreis district of Hesse, Germany. At a height of 518 m (1,699 ft) above sea level, it is the tallest hill in the northeast of the Eastern Hintertaunus.

== Geography ==
=== Location ===
Hesselberg lies in the northeast of the Eastern Hintertaunus region within the Taunus Nature Park. Situated in the Butzbach Forest, its summit rises 850 meters east-southeast of the village church in the Butzbach district of Bodenrod. A transmission tower stands slightly southwest of the summit.

=== Neighboring Mountains ===
The neighboring hills of Hesselberg include its northern neighbor Gickel, its northeastern spur Hainbuchenkopf, the north-northeastern Hinterste Kopf, the east-northeastern Brüler Berg located 2.5 km away and the west-southwestern Donnerskopf located 1.5 km away.

== Transport links ==
North of Hesselberg, beyond Gickel, the L 3053 state road runs along the Solmsbach stream between Espa and Weiperfelden; to the west, the L 3270 runs between Weiperfelden, Bodenrod and Michelbach; and to the southwest, the L 3353 leads from Bodenrod to Münster. The European long-distance hiking trail E3 crosses the mountain.

== See also ==
- List of mountains and hills of the Taunus
