= Fischbach (Bad Schwalbach) =

Village in Rheingau-Taunus-Kreis, Germany

Coordinates: 50°06′23″N 8°01′47″E

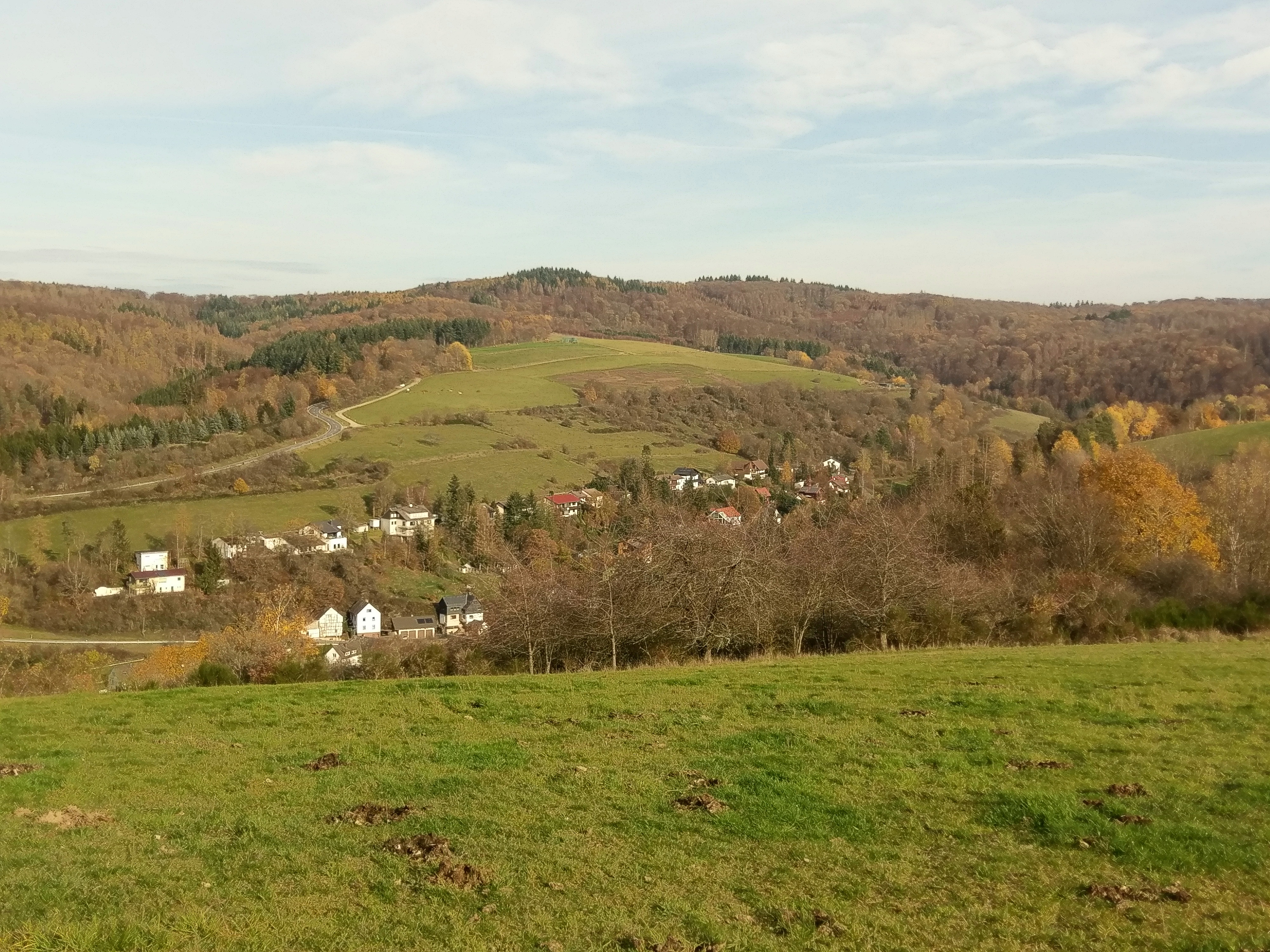
Fischbach, Bad Schwalbach

Fischbach (Bad Schwalbach) is a village southwest of the city of Bad Schwalbach in Rheingau-Taunus-Kreis, Germany. It is separated from Bad Schwalbach by the Western Aartaunus area. The district was first documented in 1220. The name "Fischbach" derives from "Vissebach", meaning "the brook that flows through the meadows."

== People from Fischbach ==
- Johann Philipp Wagner (1799-1879), German merchant and inventor
