= Stoppelberg =

Extinct volcano near the town of Wetzlar in Germany

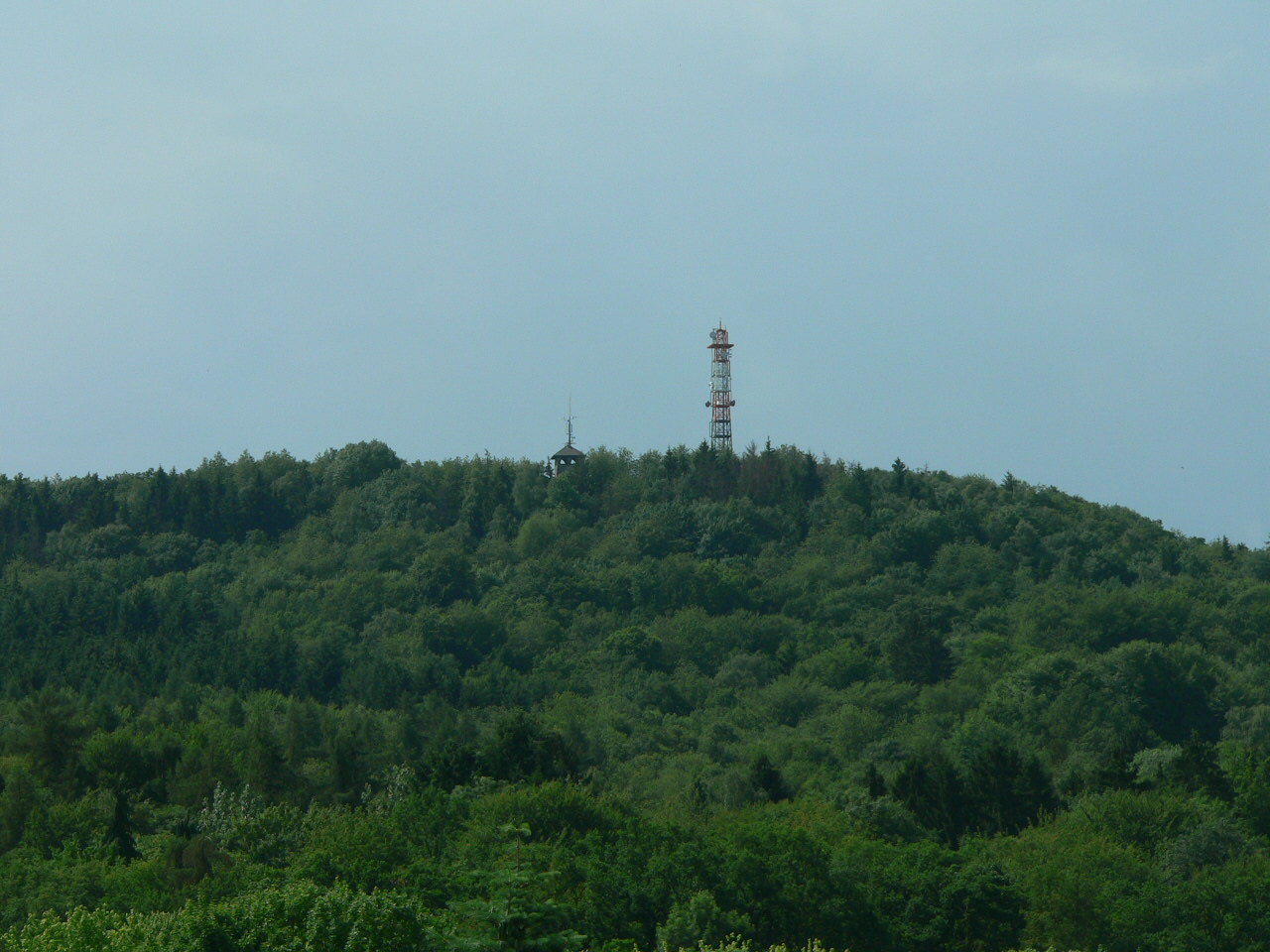
- Stoppelberg 2006

Highest point
- Elevation: 402 m (1,319 ft)
- Coordinates: 50°31′46.8″N 8°31′32.5″E

Geography
- Location: Hesse, Germany

The Stoppelberg is an extinct volcano near the town of Wetzlar in Germany.
