= Gickelsburg =

Hill in Germany

Coordinates: 50°16′N 8°35′E

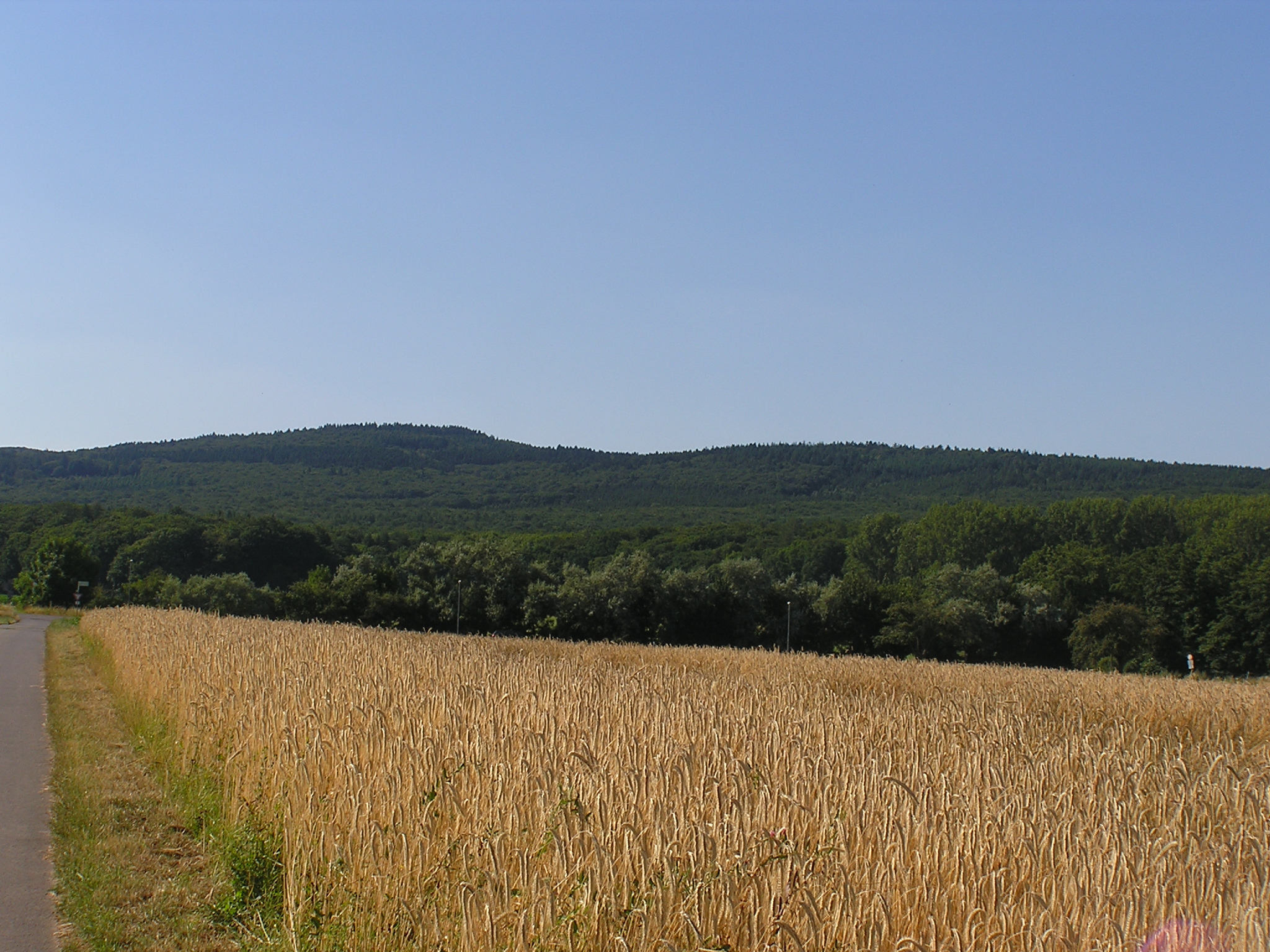

Highest point
- Elevation: 471 m (1,545 ft)

Geography
- Location within Germany Location within Hesse
- Location: Hesse, Germany

Gickelsburg is a hill near Friedrichsdorf in the state of Hesse, Germany. Its highest point is 471 metres (1,545 ft) above sea level. Around the summit, there is a Celtic ring wall.
