= Johann Philipp Wagner =

German physicist

- Born: 24 January 1799; Bad Schwalbach, Holy Roman Empire
- Died: 8 January 1879; Frankfurt, Germany
- Occupation: Inventor

Johann Philipp Wagner (24 January 1799 in Fischbach (Bad Schwalbach) – 8 January 1879 in Frankfurt) was a German merchant and inventor. He is credited for being the first person to investigate the use of electric current for transport.

== Career ==
Wagner started working in the iron industry in 1815. In 1836, with the help of mechanic Fritz Albert, Wagner built and presented an electromagnetic engine at the annual celebration of the Senckenberg Society. In 1840, Wagner built his first "electric train" in his workshop, which weighed 40 pounds, and could pull another 60-pound car for several hours at considerable speed.

On 10 November 1840 Wagner was granted a patent to build an electromagnetic rotary apparatus. On 15 January 1841 he presented the completed work. On 25 February 1841 Wagner described in his report to the Federal Assembly the disadvantages of the steam operation (smoke and steam), compared to electric alternative. On 13 June 1844 the Federal Assembly concluded that Wagner's engine was 12 times more expensive to build than the steam engine.
