= Roßkopf (Taunus) =

Mountain in Hesse, Germany

Coordinates: 50°15′30″N 8°31′45″E

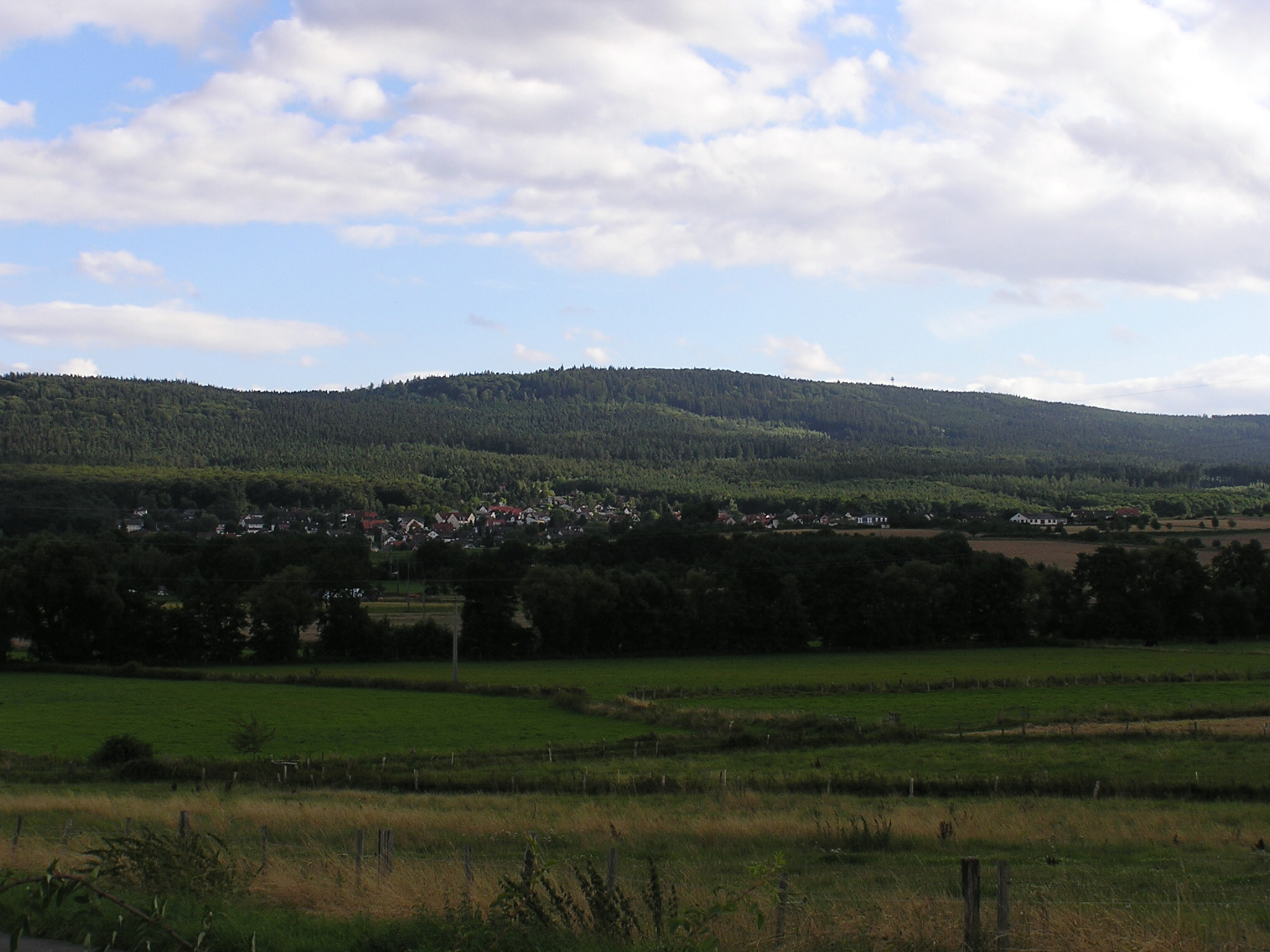

Highest point
- Elevation: 632 m (2,073 ft)

Geography
- Location: Hesse, Germany

Roßkopf is a mountain of Hesse, Germany.
