= Eschbach (Usingen) =

- Borough of Usingen
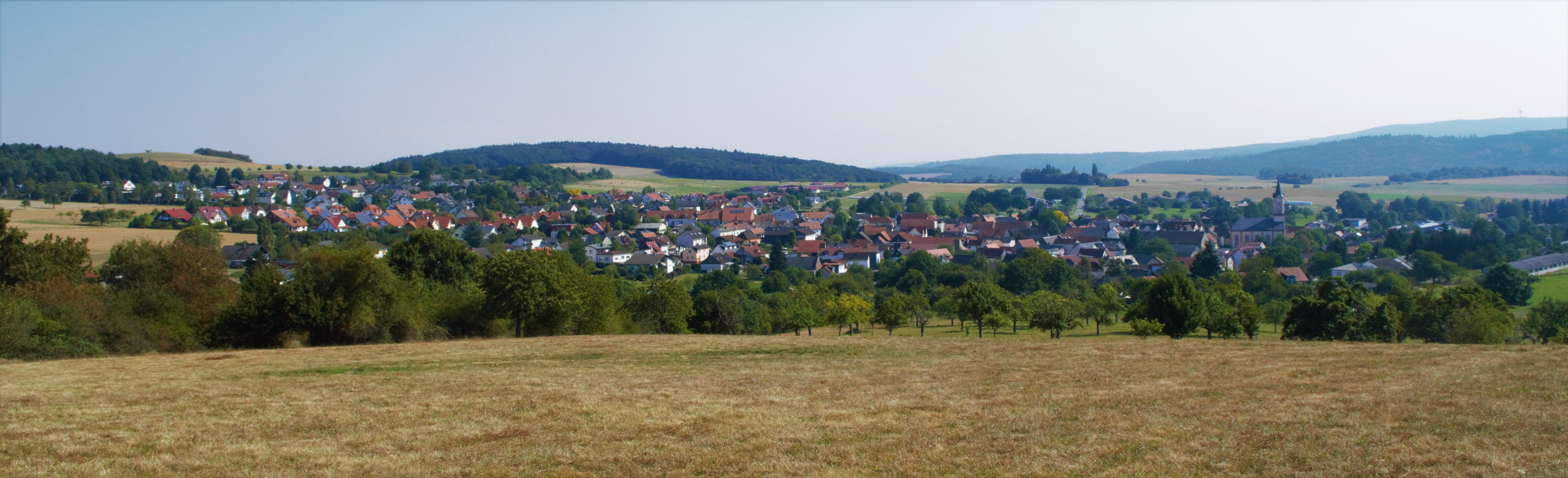

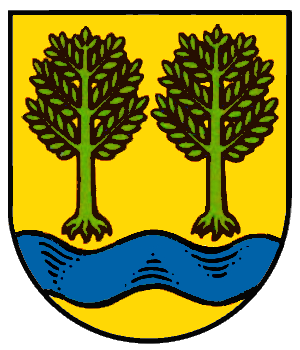
- Coat of arms
- Interactive map of Eschbach
- Location within Germany Location within Hesse
- Coordinates: 50°21′25″N 8°32′13″E
- Country: Germany
- State: Hesse
- District: Hochtaunuskreis
- Town: Usingen
- Elevation: 314 m (1,030 ft)

Population (2011)
  - Total: 1,953
- Time zone: UTC+01:00 (CET)
  - Summer (DST): UTC+02:00 (CEST)
- Postal codes: 61250

Eschbach (German pronunciation: [ˈɛʃbax]) is a borough of Usingen in the Hochtaunuskreis in Hessen. The once almost entirely agriculturally based village at the northern edge of the Usinger Becken first appeared in 1280 in the County Cleeberg under the name of Ketteneschbach. The current district of Usingen was known far beyond the Taunus already early through good catering, later through the campsite in the forest and the former weekend-settlement below the Eschbacher Klippen.

== Geographical setting ==
The village is located on the eponymous river at the northern edge of the Usinger Becken. Hence situated at the northeastern border of the Taunus, it is surrounded by mixed coniferous forest, fields and meadows. It is located 2 km north of Usingen and 32 km north of Frankfurt am Main. In the north borders Michelbach, in the east Wernborn, in the south Usingen and in the west the Bundesstraße 456 with the direction to Grävenwiesbach and Weilburg.

== History ==
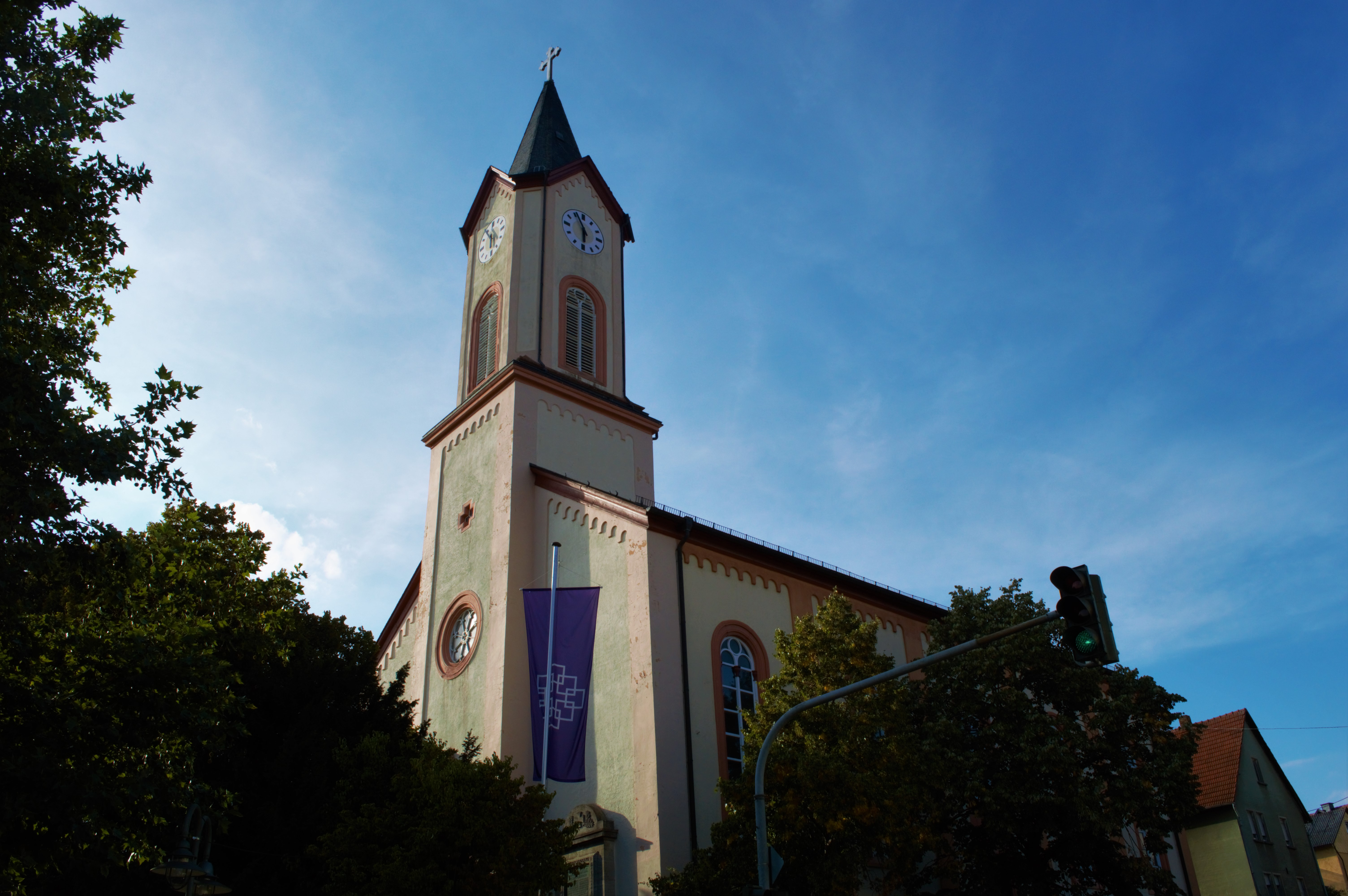
Protestant Church

The first documented mention was in 1280 as part of the County Cleeberg. Until the time of the Protestant Reformation, Eschbach belonged ecclesiastically and judicially to Grävenwiesbach. Through the Protestant Reformation it became setting of an own parish. In 1596 Eschbach became part of Nassau-Usingen. In 1933 the village had 907 inhabitants. Since the communal reform in Hesse that was empowered on 1 August 1972 Eschbach is a district of Usingen.

== Cityscape ==
=== Protestant church ===
From 1843 to 1846 the Protestant church was built in Romanesque Revival style according to the plans of the architect Eduard Bautzer from Weilburg at the place of a preceding building mentioned in 1388. The ecclesiastically municipal includes besides Eschbach also Michelbach and Wernborn and has got an own municipal house. The municipal has a partnership with Wandersleben.

=== Old school ===
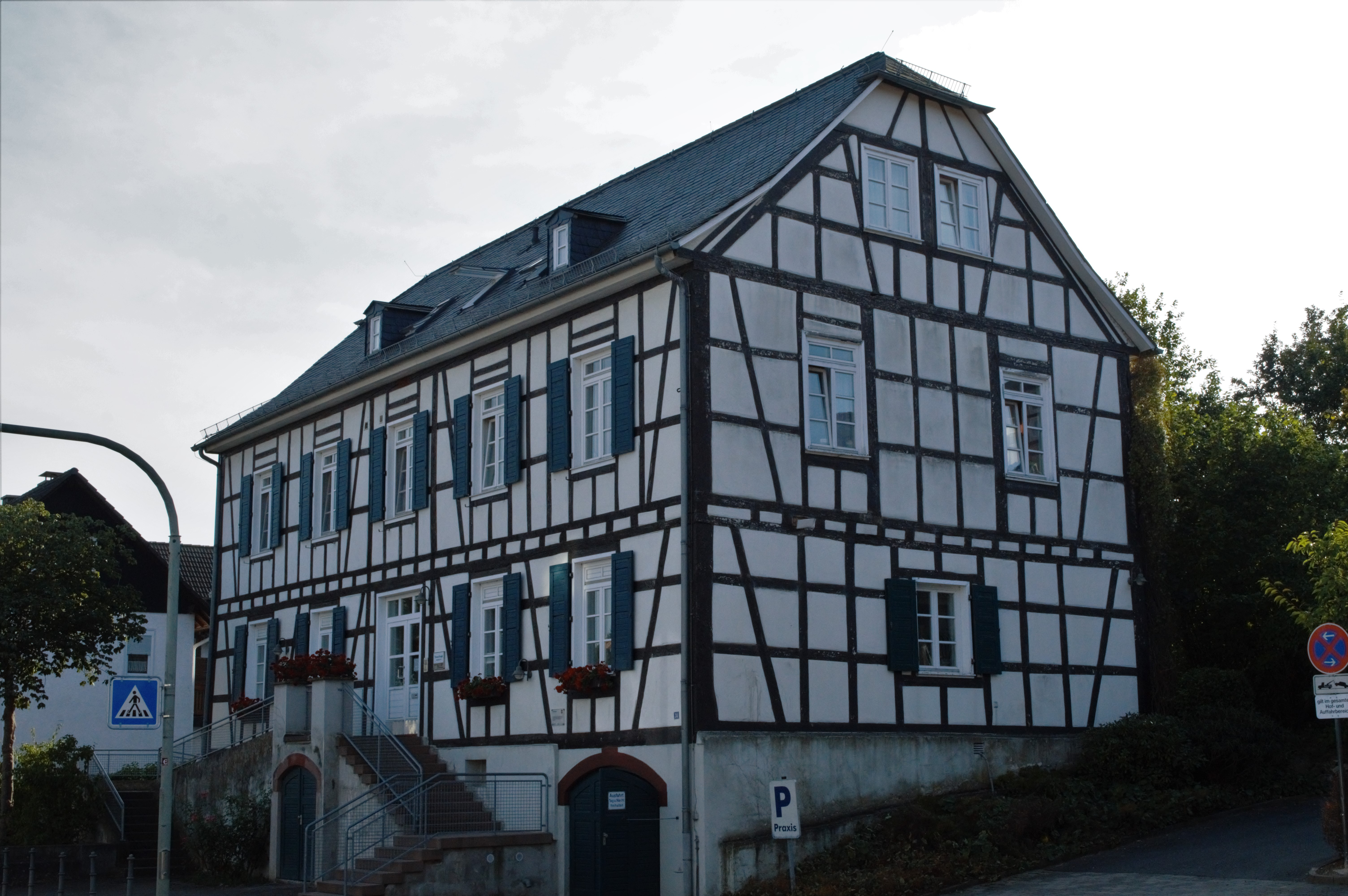
Old School

In 1828 at the area of the former Hattsteiner Hof a school with two classes, apartments for the teachers and a school garden was built. Today it is a renewed truss house and an eye-catcher in the village center and includes a surgery.

=== Herrschaftlicher Hof ===
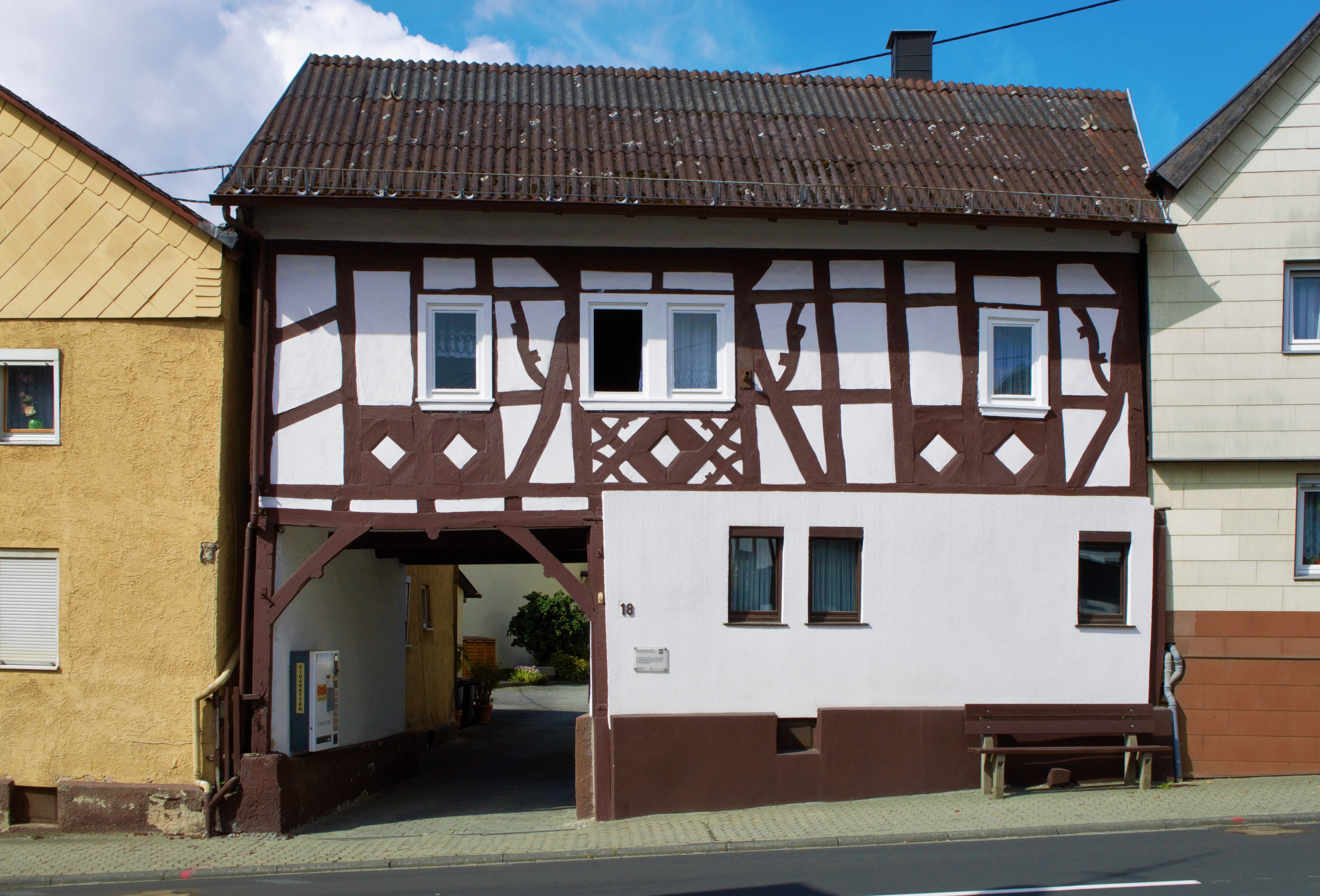
Herrschaftlicher Hof

Nowadays the so-called Gesindehaus and apartment, that was built around 1700 at the yard of the premises bought by Prince Walrad of Nassau-Usingen for his wife Maria Isabella of Croy.

=== Eschbacher Klippen ===
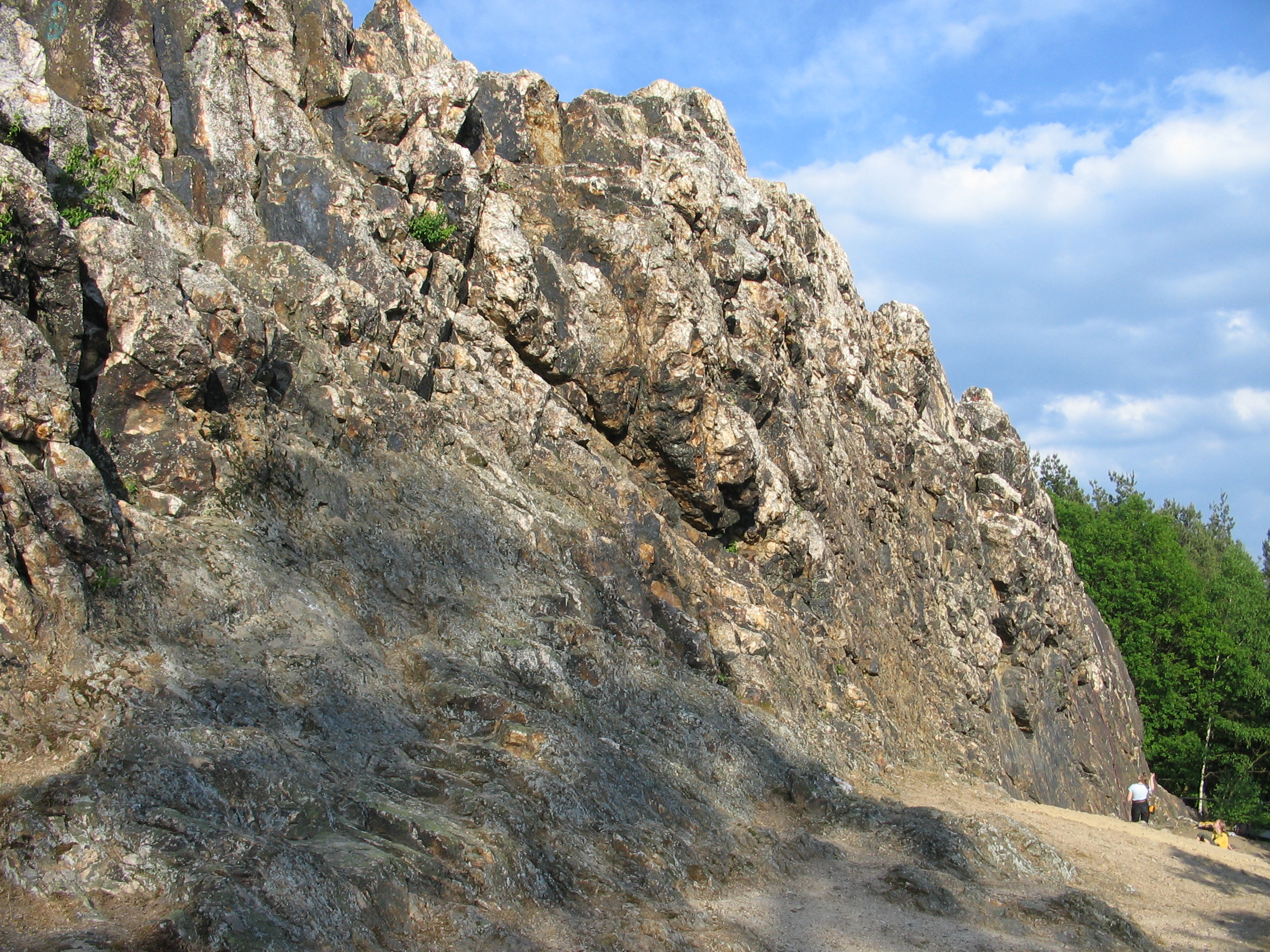
Eschbacher Klippen

Normally "Buchsteinfelsen" the rocks were called also "Kaiserin-Friedrich-Klippe" around 1910. They are situated some hundred meters above the northern edge of the village and have got a height up to 12 meters. The crag made of quartz is a visible part of an about 6 km long corridor that continues across the valley of the Usa River until the Wormstein in the city forest of Usingen. From a geological standpoint it is a dip fault that was formed through the internal buckling of the mountains. The tough quartz could resist on several places the erosion and appears today on many places in the Taunus, however rarely so spectacular like here. In the west of the cliffs on the other side of the Kreisstraße Usingen-Michelbach a bit hidden in the forest there is a "sister rock", the Saienstein. In the south there existed earlier an Open-Air stage, whose remains are still visible. Even today there is a "Klippenkonzert" performed every year that is very popular in the local area. Climbers are using the scarp face for training units. There are well-saved tours with pitons in the difficulties I-VII. Especially the south wall of the cliffs is very popular.

== Culture ==
=== Regular events ===
- Saturday before Shrove Monday: Traditional carnival celebration "Klippenbeben" in the community center
- Early June: Eschbacher Flohmarkt with the support of the Gewerbevereins and the Turn- und Spielvereins Eschbach 1901 e.V.
- Late September: Oktoberfest of the Freiwillige Feuerwehr Eschbach
- Advent: nativity play in the Protestant church

=== Associations ===
- Brieftaubenverein Luftbote Eschbach e.V.
- EFC Klippenadler Eschbach 99 e.V.
- Freiwillige Feuerwehr Eschbach
- Gewerbeverein Eschbach
- MSC-Rund um die Klippen e.V.
- Rassegeflügel-Zuchtverein e.V. Eschbach
- Reit-& Fahrverein Usingen-Eschbach e.V.
- Schachclub Eschbach 1947 e.V.
- Schützenverein 1900 Eschbach e.V.
- Sängervereinigung 1839 Eschbach/Ts. e.V.
- Tisch-Tennis-Club Eschbach e.V.
- Turn- und Spielverein Eschbach 1901 e.V.
- Vogelschutzgruppe Eschbach e.V.

== Economy and infrastructure ==
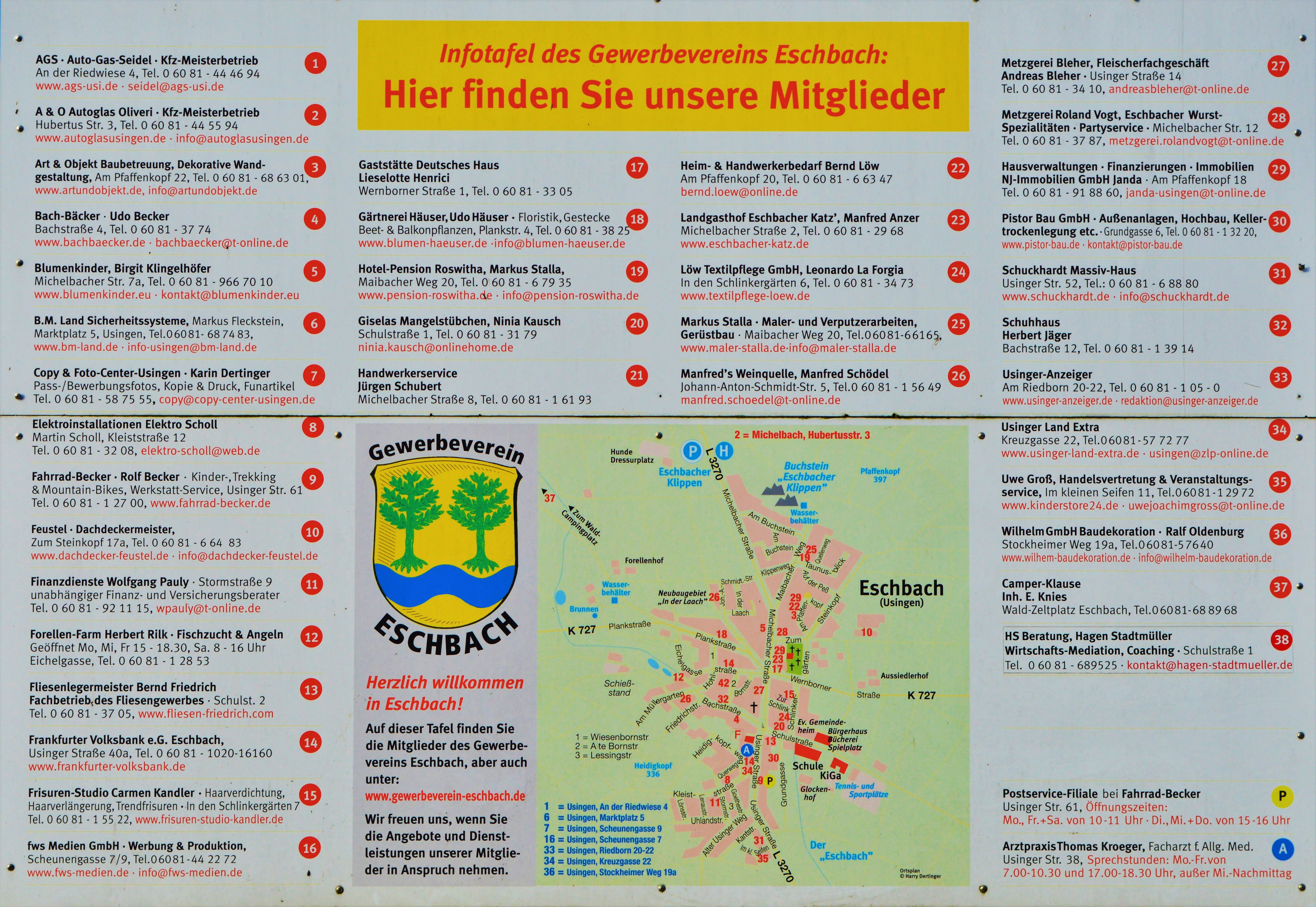
Businesses of Eschbach

=== Traffic ===
Eschbach is situated at the Landesstraße L3270. 2 km in the west of the city center there is a connection to the Bundesstraße 456 and 12 km in the east a connection to the highway A5 over Ober-Mörlen. Eschbach has a bus connection to Usingen, Michelbach and Wernborn.

=== Institutions ===
- Kindergarten Tabaluga
- Primary School Buchfinkenschule
- Freiwillige Feuerwehr
- Community center
- Playgrounds, football area
- Football pitches, tennis courts
- Campsite and pond (former swimming pool)
- Dog court

=== Enterprises ===
Besides a bakery there are two butchers and two inns (Eschbacher Katz and Zum Deutschen Haus) in Eschbach. There are also many local enterprises and several riding yards and farms.

== Personalities ==
Adolf Korell (1872–1941), liberal minister for work and economy of the Volksstaat Hessen was in 1941 priest in Eschbach and also died here.
