= Opelbad =

Public pool in Wiesbaden, Germany

Coordinates: 50.09746°N 8.231445°E

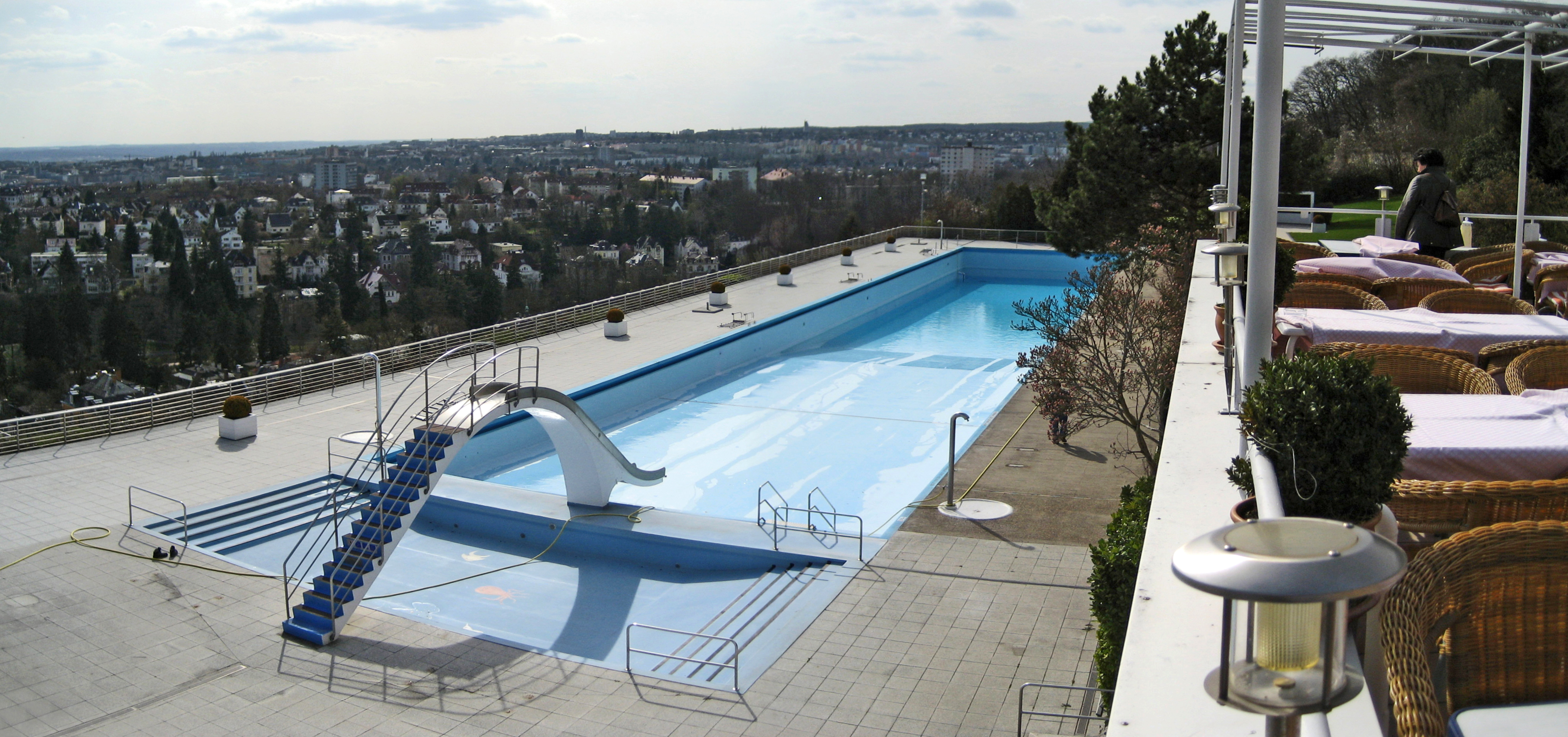
The pool

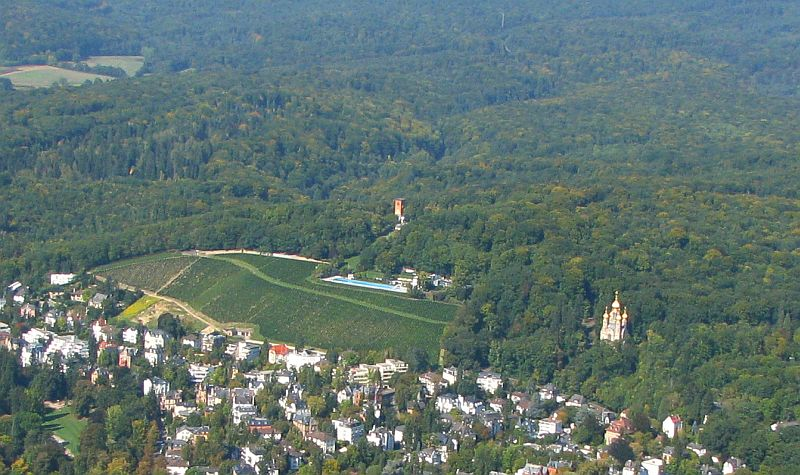
Aerial view of the lido and the Neroberg

Opelbad is a lido situated on Neroberg in Wiesbaden, Germany opened in 1934. A foundation established by the Privy Councilor Wilhelm von Opel funded the construction of this summer pool on Wiesbaden's own hill, Neroberg, in 1934. The swimming pool is designed in the Bauhaus style, with water temperatures of at least 24 degrees. The 14,500 square metre swimming pool grounds on Wiesbaden's own hill is operated by mattiaqua and offers a view above the city.
