= Dahlheim =

- Municipality
- Coat of arms

- Location of Dahlheim within Rhein-Lahn-Kreis district
- Interactive map of Dahlheim
- Location within Germany Location within Rhineland-Palatinate
- Coordinates: 50°12′37″N 7°41′40″E
- Country: Germany
- State: Rhineland-Palatinate
- District: Rhein-Lahn-Kreis
- Municipal assoc.: Loreley

Government
  - Mayor (2019–24): Marco Jost

Area
  - Total: 6.82 km^{2} (2.63 sq mi)
- Elevation: 260 m (850 ft)

Population (2025-12-31)
  - Total: 801
  - Density: 117/km^{2} (304/sq mi)
- Time zone: UTC+01:00 (CET)
  - Summer (DST): UTC+02:00 (CEST)
- Postal codes: 56348
- Dialling codes: 06771
- Vehicle registration: EMS, DIZ, GOH

Dahlheim (German pronunciation: [ˈdaːlhaɪm]) is a municipality in the district of Rhein-Lahn, in Rhineland-Palatinate, in western Germany.
