= Sommerberg (Taunus) =

Mountain in Hesse, Germany

Coordinates: 50°17′56″N 8°21′06″E

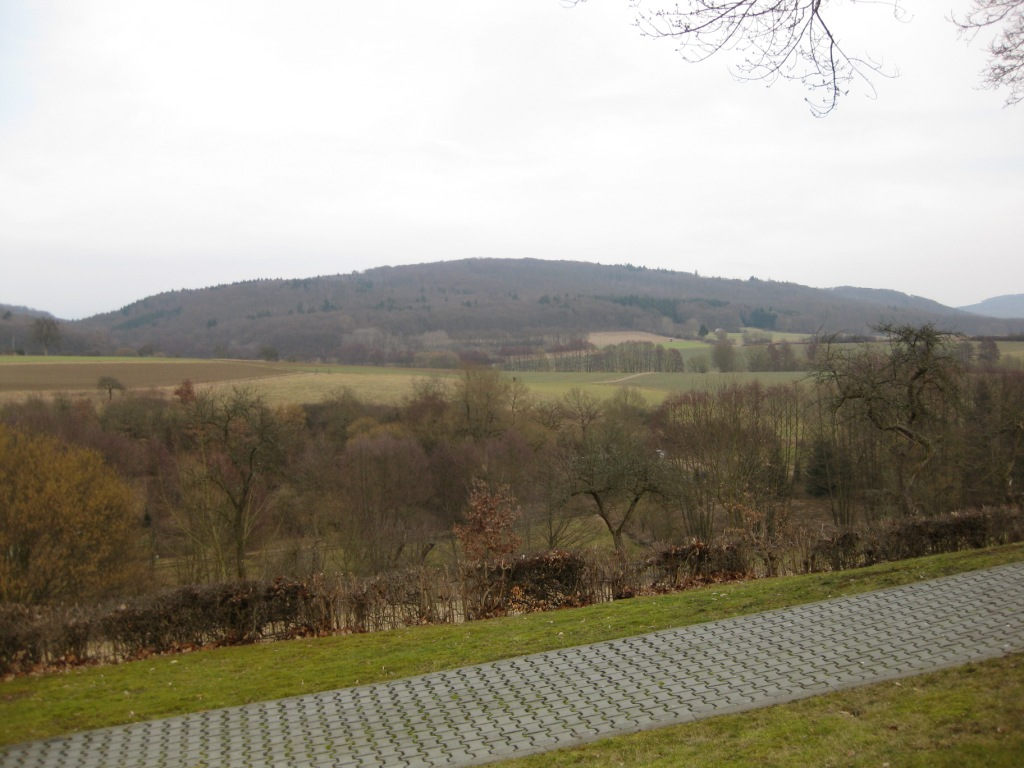

Highest point
- Elevation: 460.8 m (1,512 ft)

Geography
- Location: Hesse, Germany

Sommerberg is a mountain of Hesse, Germany.
