= Grauer Kopf (Holzhausen) =

Coordinates: 50°12′45″N 7°57′04″E

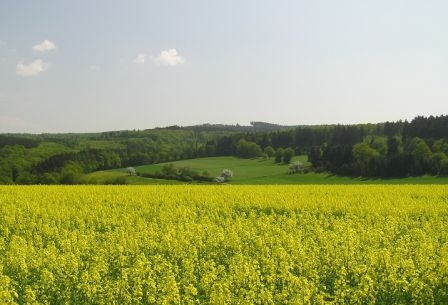
- View of Grauer Kopf from the southwest

Highest point
- Elevation: 543 m (1,781 ft)

Geography
- Location: Hesse, Germany

The Grauer Kopf is a hill in Hesse, Germany.
