= Kemel =

Kemel is a name. Notable people with this name include:

- George Kemel (born 1931), English rugby league football player
- Kemel Thompson (born 1974), Jamaican athlete
- Myrzageldy Kemel (1949–2020), Kazakhstani writer, politician and academic
- Philippe Kemel (born 1948), French politician

== See also ==
- Kemel, Çanakkale
