= Rhine-Taunus Nature Park =

Coordinates: 50°07′48″N 8°09′36″E

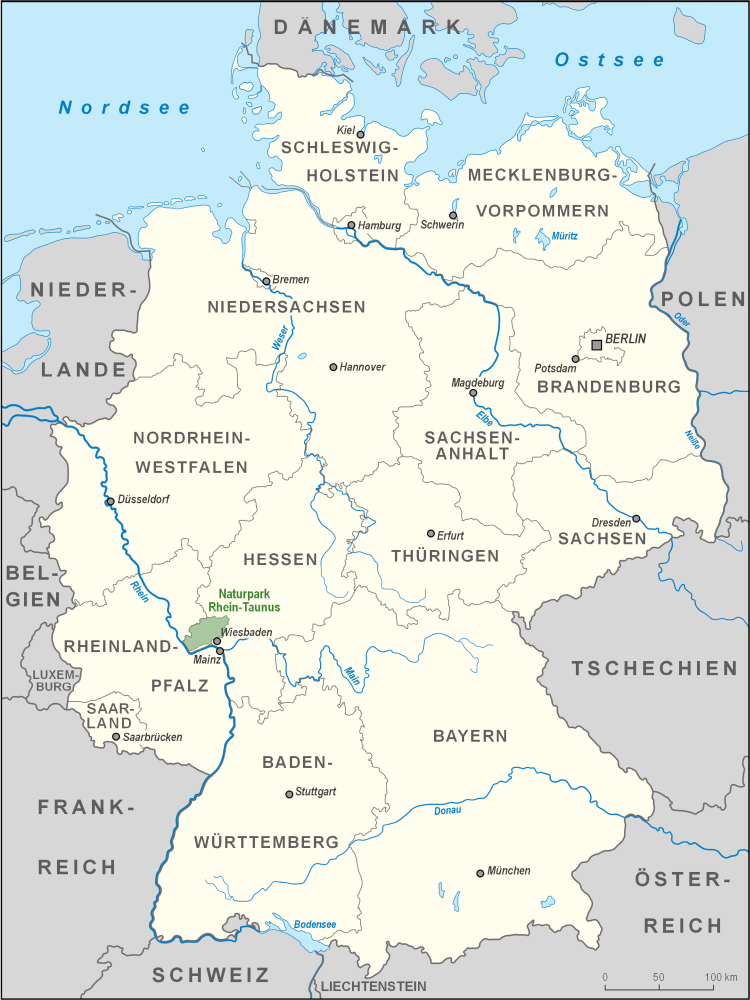
Naturpark Rhein-Taunus in Germany

The Rhine Taunus Nature Park (German: Naturpark Rhein-Taunus), located in the Rheingau-Taunus-Kreis and Wiesbaden district of Hesse, Germany was founded in 1968. It includes the western part of the Taunus and extends over the Idsteiner Becken to the Rhine. It is characterized by a roughly 60 percent forested low mountain landscape, which falls away steeply toward the Rhine Gorge.

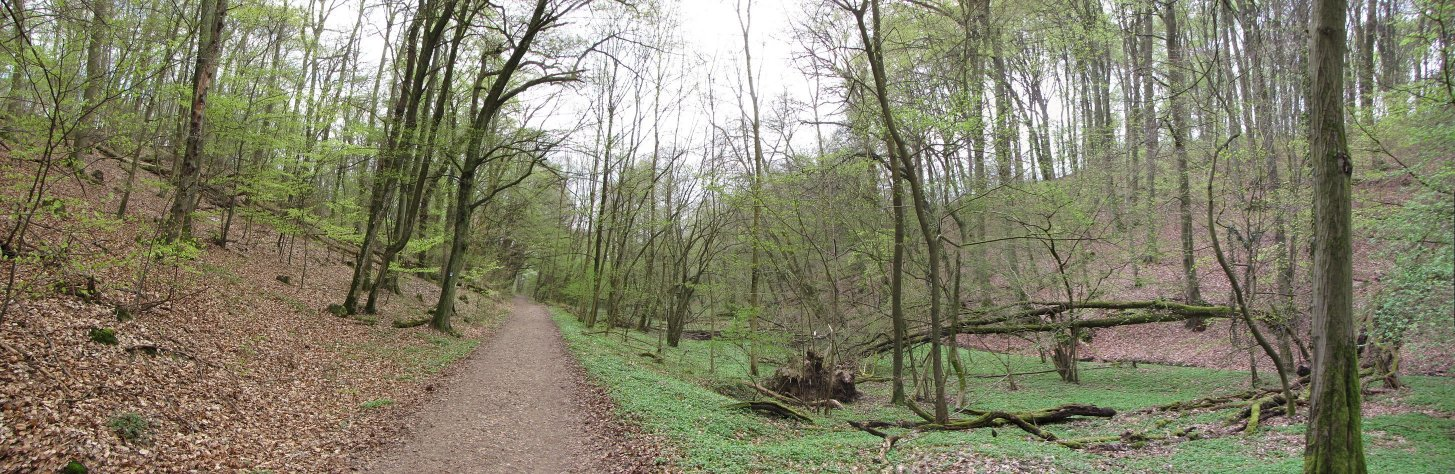
Erlenbachtal near Wiesbaden-Frauenstein

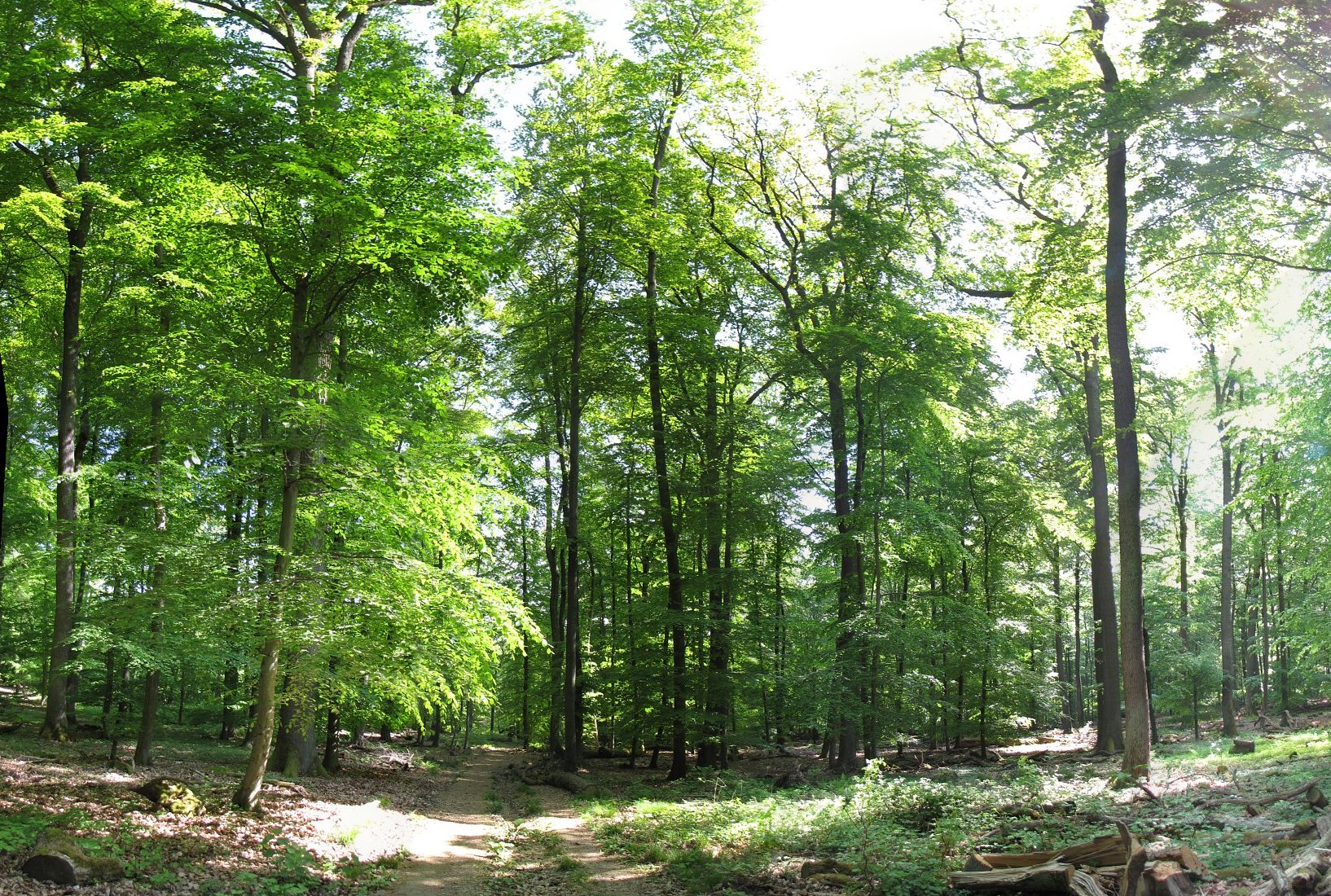
Honigberg near Kiedrich

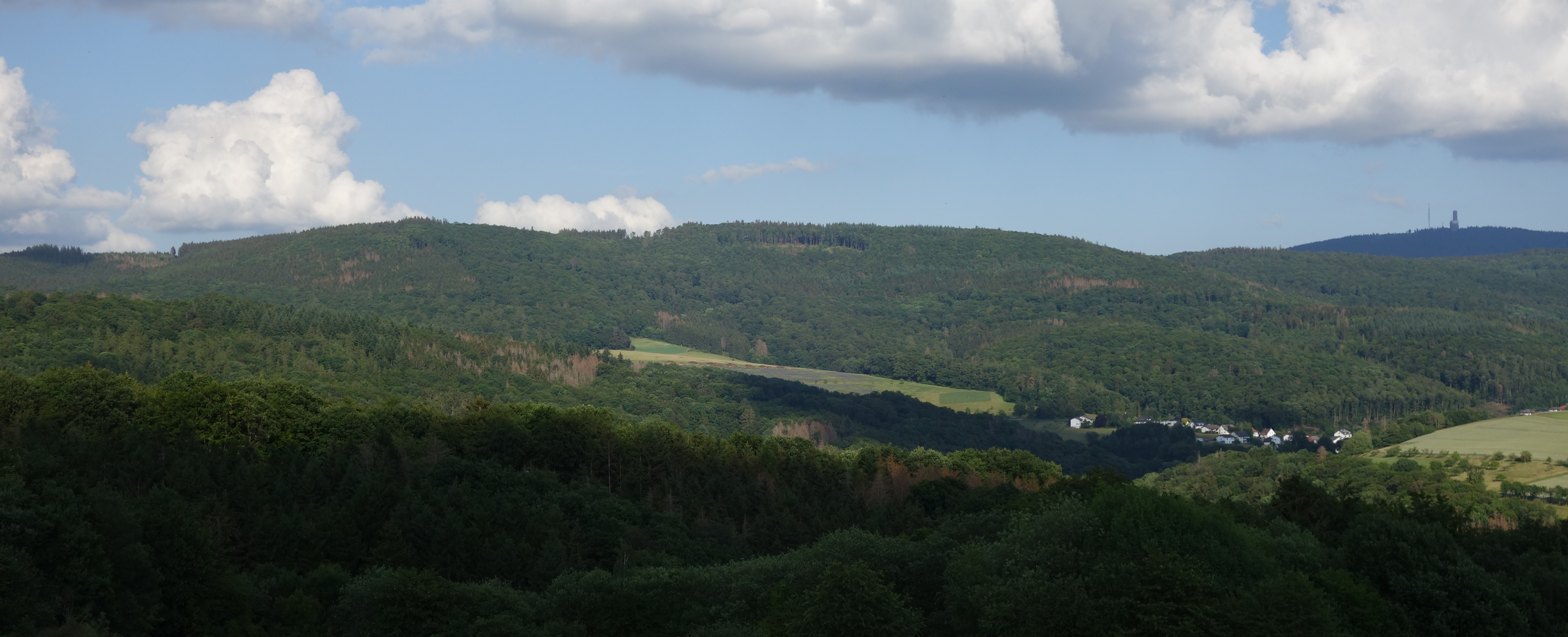
Highest point of the Rheingau-Taunus-Kreis: 629,3 m high mountain Windhain near Waldems

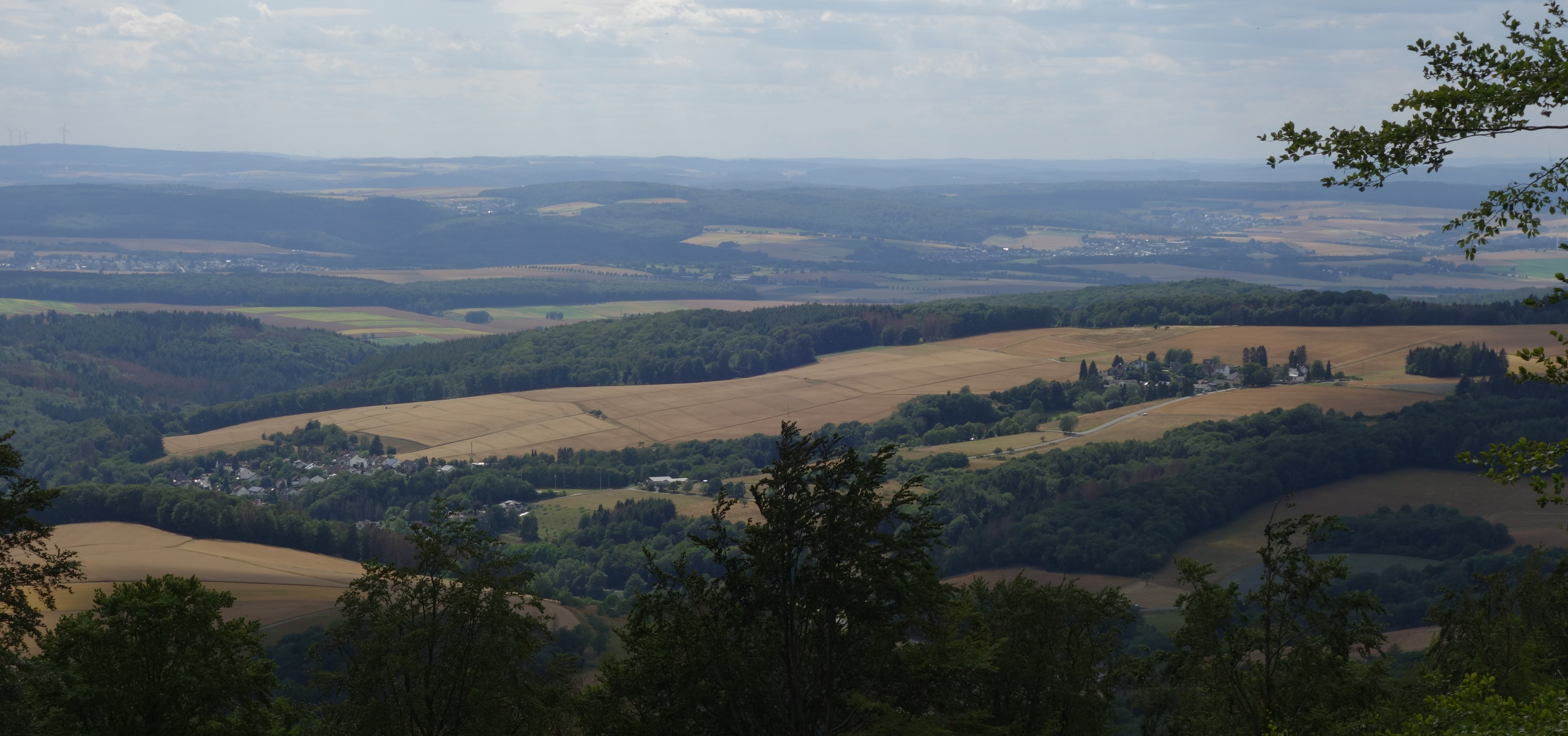
View from Windhain mountain over Waldems' constituent communities Niederems and Reinborn

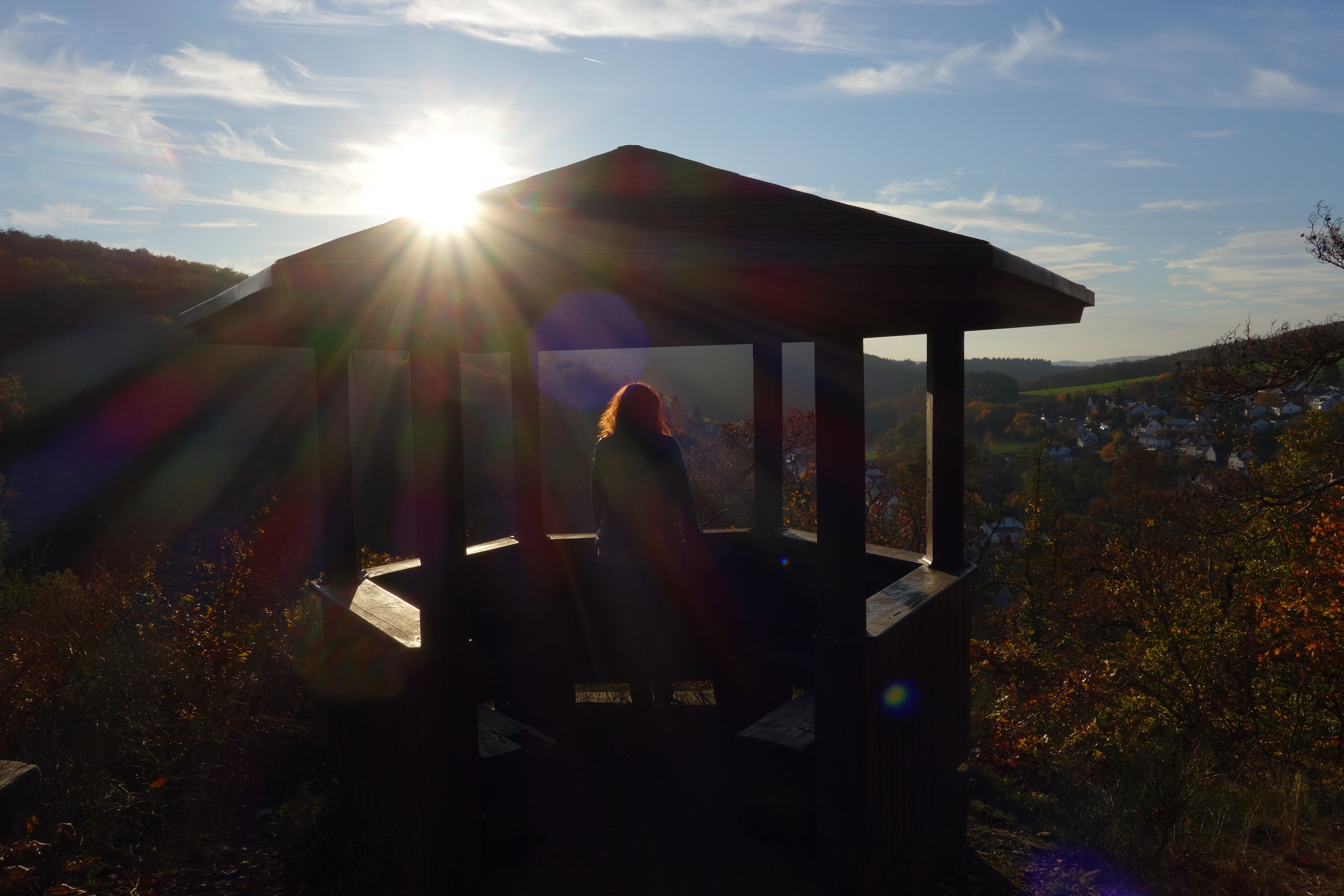
Viewpoint Isberg-Tempelchen above Niederems
