= Erbacher Kopf =

Coordinates: 50°04′06″N 8°02′06″E

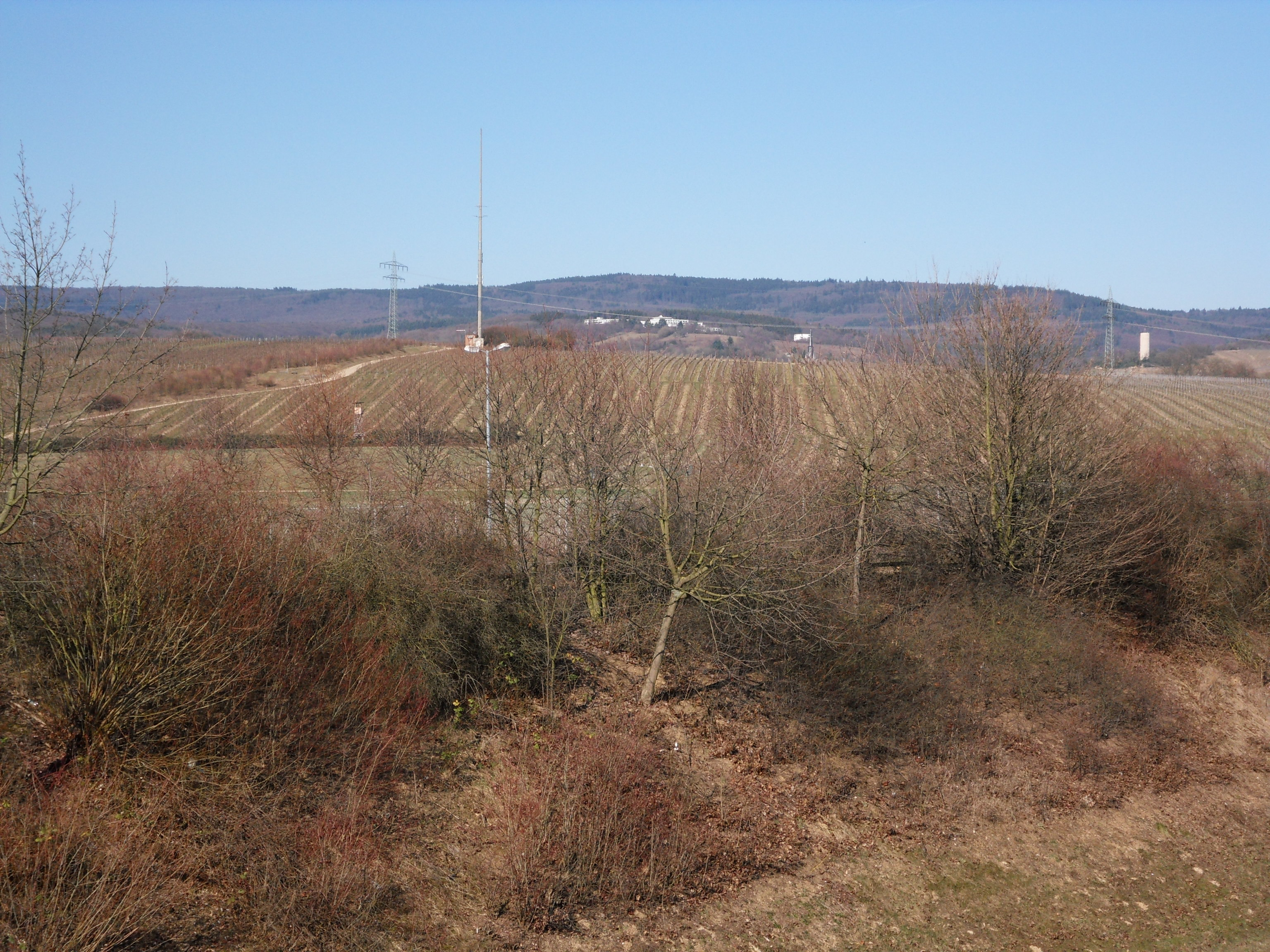

Highest point
- Elevation: 580 m (1,900 ft)

Geography
- Location: Hesse, Germany

The Erbacher Kopf is a hill in the Taunus range in Hesse, Germany.
