= Stückelberg (Taunus) =

Mountain in Hesse, Germany

Coordinates: 50°18′59″N 8°20′03″E

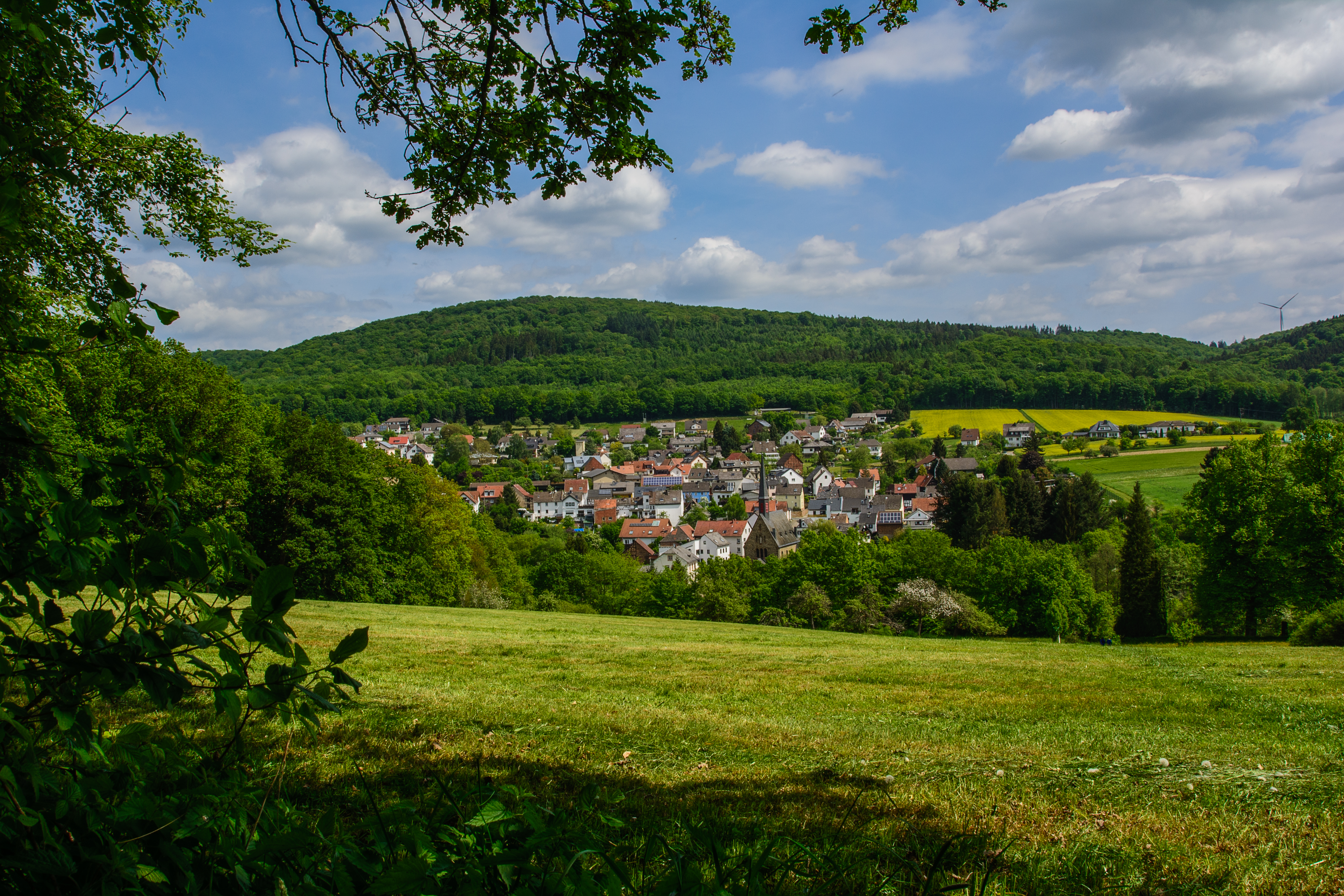
- The Stückelberg.

Highest point
- Elevation: 510 m (1,670 ft)

Geography
- Location: Hesse, Germany

Stückelberg is a mountain in the Taunus range. It is located in the Taunus Nature Park in Hesse, Germany.
