= Hallgarter Zange =

Hill in Hesse, Germany

Coordinates: 50°02′57″N 8°00′53″E

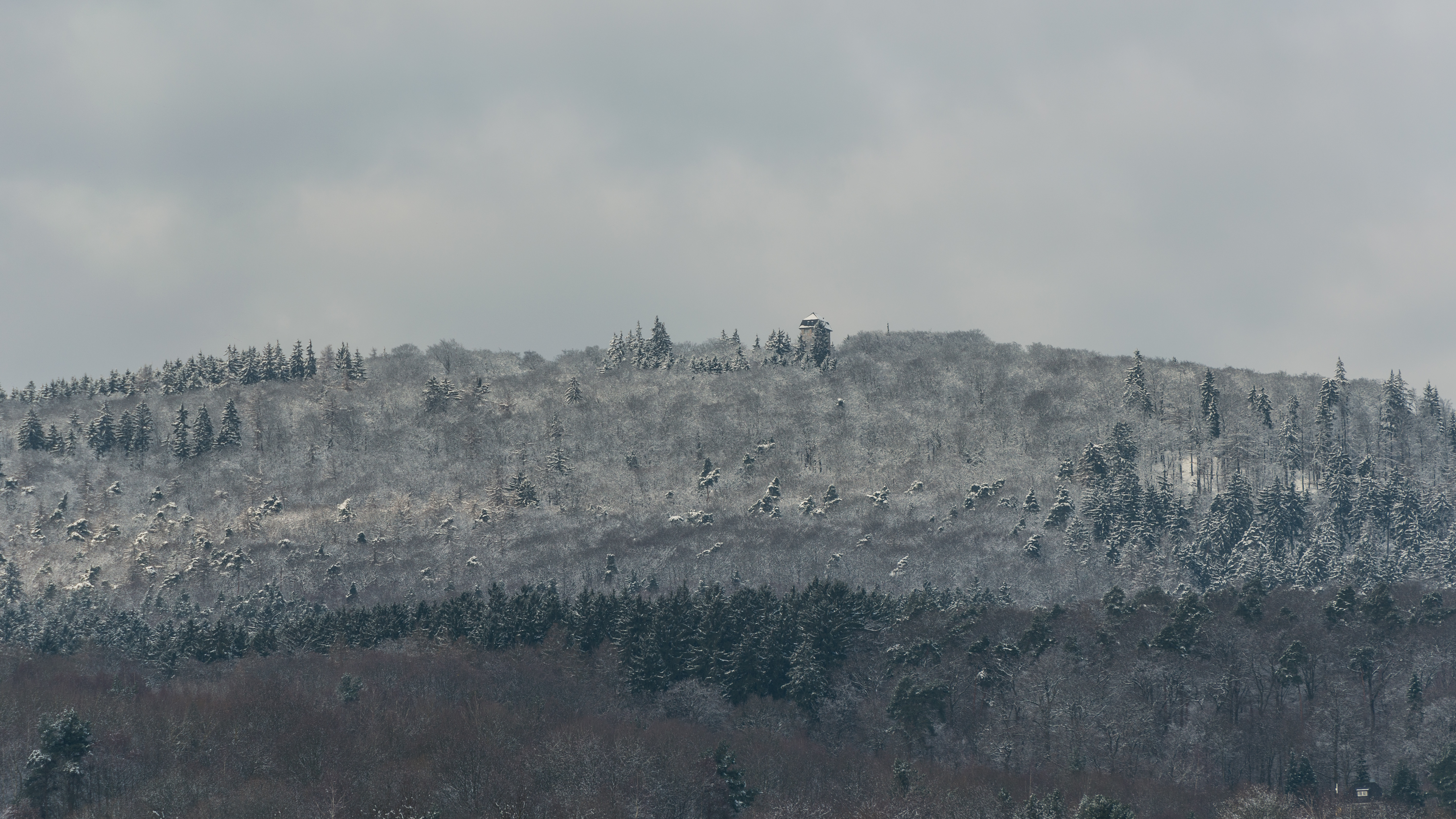
- A detail view of the Hallgarter Zange from southeast in Winter

Highest point
- Elevation: 580 m (1,900 ft)

Geography
- Location: Hesse, Germany

The Hallgarter Zange is a hill in the Taunus mountains of Hesse, Germany.
