= Kalte Herberge =

Mountain in Hesse, Germany

Coordinates: 50°03′N 8°00′E

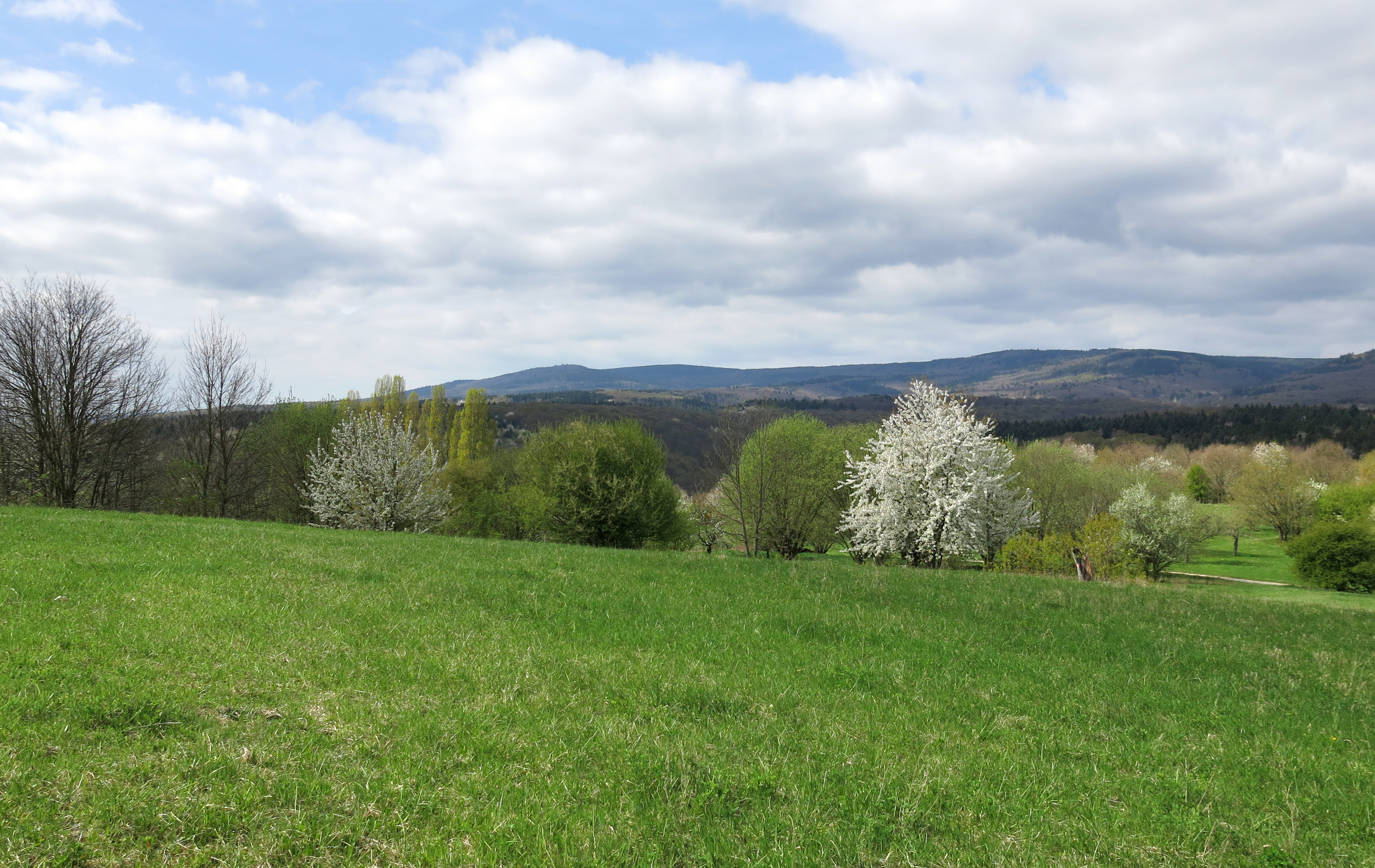
- View of Kalte Herberge among other mountain tops

Highest point
- Elevation: 619.3 m (2,032 ft)

Geography
- Location: Hesse, Germany

Kalte Herberge is a mountain of Hesse, Germany.
