= High Taunus =

German major natural region unit

High Taunus Hoher Taunus
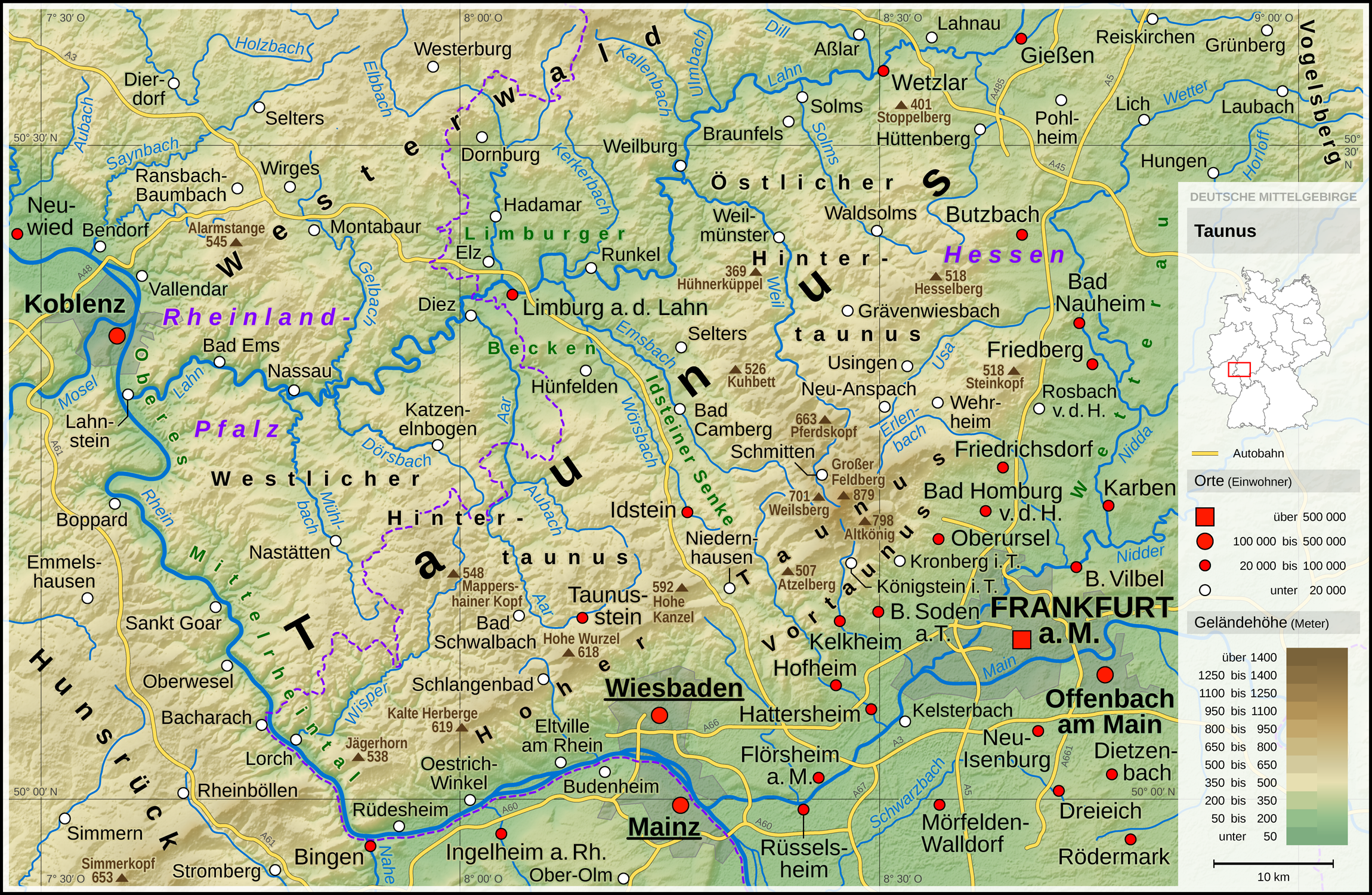
- Overview map of the Taunus

Highest point
- Peak: Großer Feldberg
- Elevation: 879 m above NHN

Dimensions
- Area: 314.92 km^{2} (121.59 mi^{2})

Geography
- State(s): Hesse, Germany
- Range coordinates: 50°13′57″N 8°27′32″E
- Parent range: Taunus

Geology
- Orogeny: Low mountains
- Rock type(s): Grey phyllite, Hermeskeil beds, coloured slate, Taunus quartzite

The High Taunus (German: Hoher Taunus) is the name of a major natural region unit (no. 301) in the Hessian Central Uplands range of the Taunus mountains and forms the area immediately around the main ridge of the Taunus. It should not be confused with the term Hochtaunus, in the sense used in the name of the county of Hochtaunuskreis which is only the eastern part of the Feldberg massif. The High Taunus separates the Anterior Taunus in the south from the Lower Taunus in the north and includes the majority of the highest mountains and hills of the Taunus. The eastern part of the natural region lies within the Taunus Nature Park and its western part in the Rhine-Taunus Nature Park.

== Location ==
The High Taunus runs as a mountain ridge from southwest to northeast from the Middle Rhine opposite the Bingen Forest to the Wetterau before Bad Nauheim for a distance of 75 kilometres; its average widths being only 4 to 5 km. The narrowest point on the ridge is only 2.4 km and is located on the heights of the Saalburg. At 7 km, the widest part of the natural region lies between Presberg and Rüdesheim am Rhein. From the Main-Taunus Plain (ca. 100 m above sea level (NHN)) in the south the ridge zone climbs rapidly and steeply to over 600 to 879 m, and rises above the plain by 400 to 600 metres (m). To the north the Taunus ridge descends steeply but only around 200 to 300 m to the Lower Taunus.

The geological heart of the Taunus crest unit is formed by strata of Taunus quartzite several hundred metres thick. The very weather-resistant rock forms many of the peaks on the main ridge of the Taunus, such as the Großer Feldberg which, at 879 m is the highest mountain in the Taunus, but it also forms island-like mountains to the south such as the Hallgarter Zange, the Schläferskopf, the Kellerskopf and the Altkönig. In places, a parallel ridge has formed: along the Theißtal near Niedernhausen, which is bounded in the north and south by two lines of mountains.

== Mountains ==
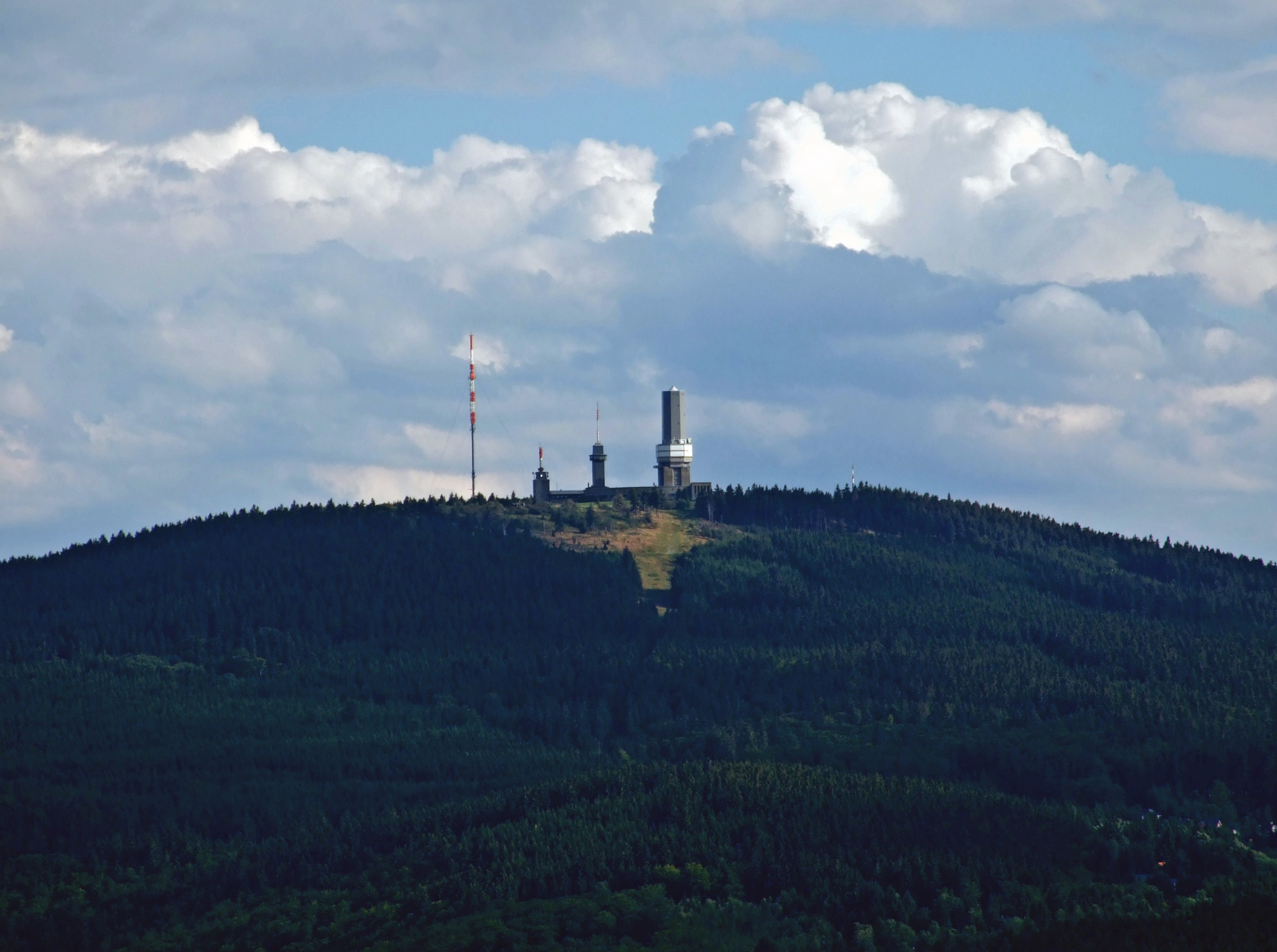
Großer Feldberg

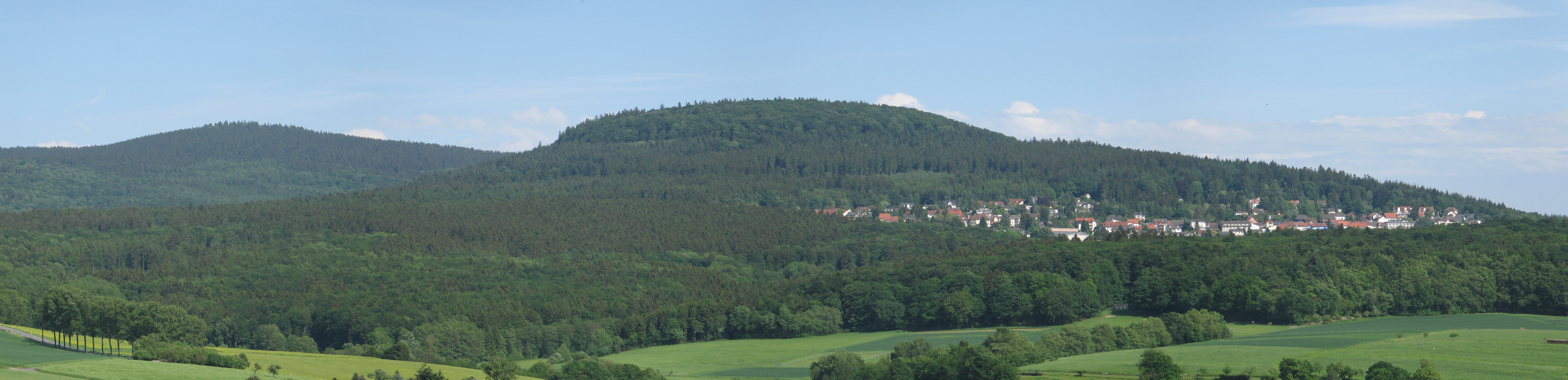
Glaskopf and village Glashütten. Rear left: Kleiner Feldberg

The highest mountains in the High Taunus include:

Name, (height in metres above sea level), location

- Großer Feldberg (879 m), Feldberg-Taunuskamm
- Kleiner Feldberg (825.2 m), Feldberg-Taunuskamm
- Altkönig (798.2 m), Feldberg-Taunuskamm
- Glaskopf (686.8 m), Feldberg-Taunuskamm
- Kolbenberg (684.0 m), Feldberg-Taunuskamm
- Klingenkopf (682.7 m), Feldberg-Taunuskamm
- Roßkopf (635–640 m), Feldberg-Taunuskamm
- Eichkopf (620.2 m), Feldberg-Taunuskamm
- Kalte Herberge (619.3 m), Rheingaugebirge
- Hohe Wurzel (617.9 m), Wiesbadener Hochtaunus

== Settlements ==
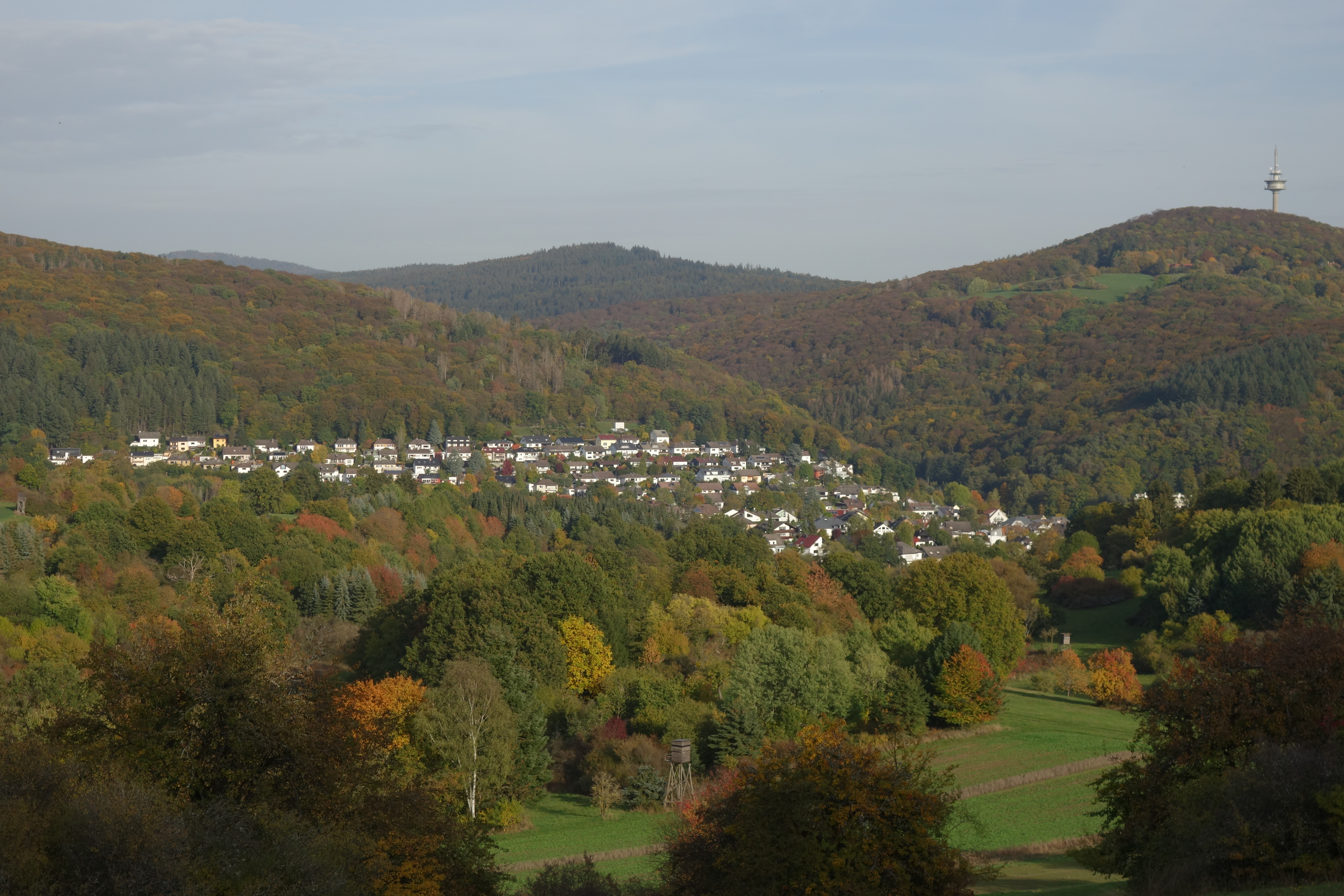
Northern part of Ehlhalten underneath Spitzeberg mountain (449,5 m) on the left; Atzelberg (506,7 m) on the right, in the middle of the background Eichkopf near Ruppertshain (563,3 m, highest mountain of Main-Taunus-Kreis district)

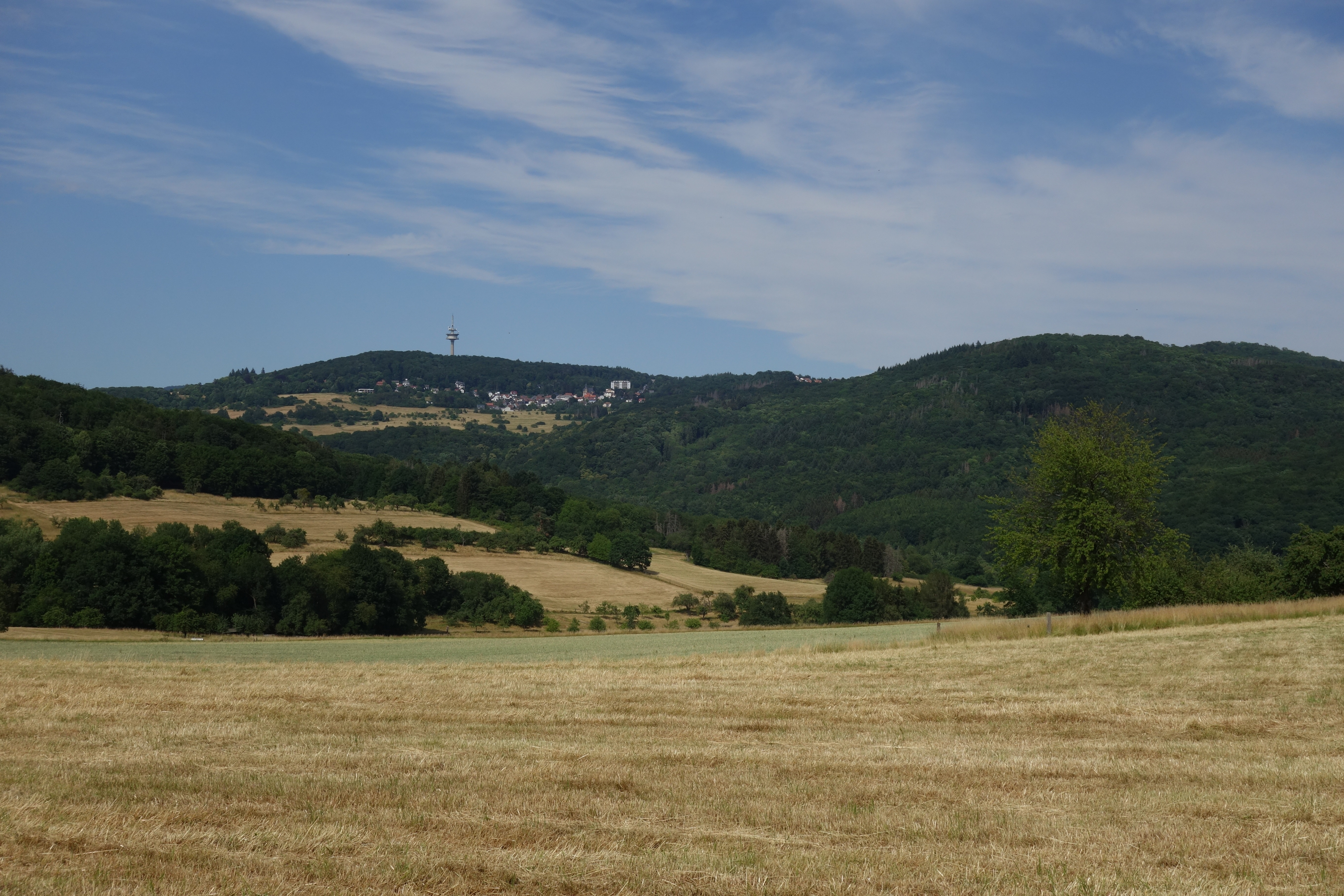
Eppenhain and Atzelberg with radio tower on the left; Rossert hilltop Hainkopf (474 m, on the right, part of Anterior Taunus)

The settlements in or on the edge of the High Taunus include:

- Aulhausen
- Bärstadt
- Ehlhalten
- Eppenhain
- Georgenborn
- Glashütten
- Hausen vor der Höhe
- Hof Mappen
- Königshofen
- Niedernhausen
- Oberjosbach
- Ruppertshain
- Schlangenbad
- Schloßborn
- Seitzenhahn
- Stephanshausen
- Wambach

== See also ==
- Height of the Großer Feldberg

== Literature ==
- Reimer Hermann: Vergleichende Hydrogeographie des Taunus und seiner südlichen und südöstlichen Randgebiete, Wilhelm Schmitz Verlag, Gießen, 1965
- Alexander Stahr, Birgit Bender: Der Taunus – Eine Zeitreise, Stuttgart, 2007, ISBN 978-3-510-65224-2
- Eugen Ernst: Der Taunus – Ein L(i)ebenswertes Mittelgebirge, Frankfurt, 2009, ISBN 978-3-7973-1146-7
