= Taunus Nature Park =

Nature park in Germany

Taunus Nature Park Naturpark Taunus
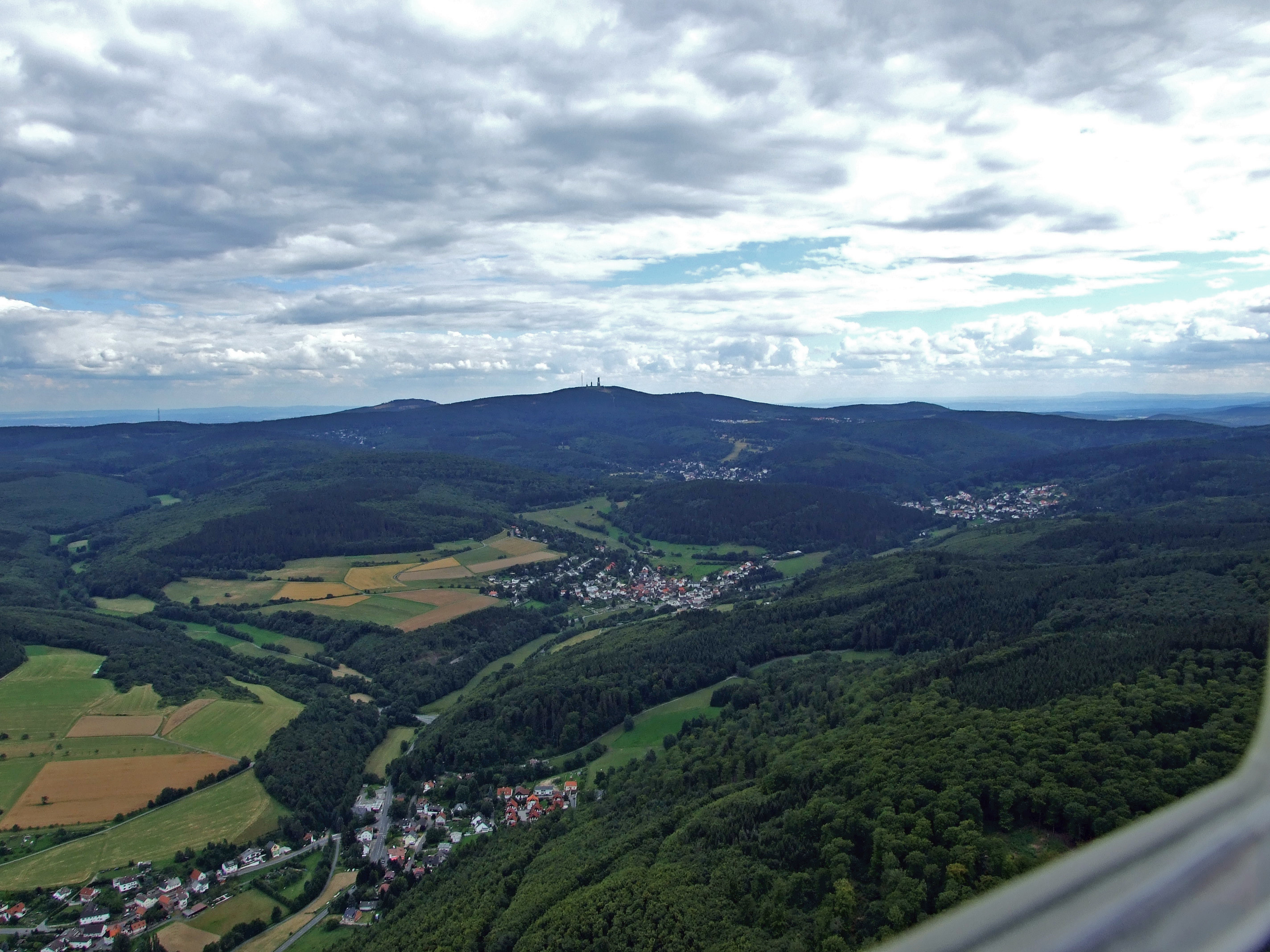
- Panorama of the High Taunus from the Eastern Hintertaunus
- Interactive map of Taunus Nature Park; Naturpark Taunus
- Location: Zweckverband „Naturpark Taunus“ Hohemarkstr. 192; 61440 Oberursel http://www.naturpark-taunus.de
- Nearest city: Frankfurt, Gießen, Limburg, Wetzlar, Wiesbaden
- Coordinates: 50°11′N 8°18′E
- Area: 1,347.75 km^{2} (520.37 sq mi)
- Established: 30 May 1962

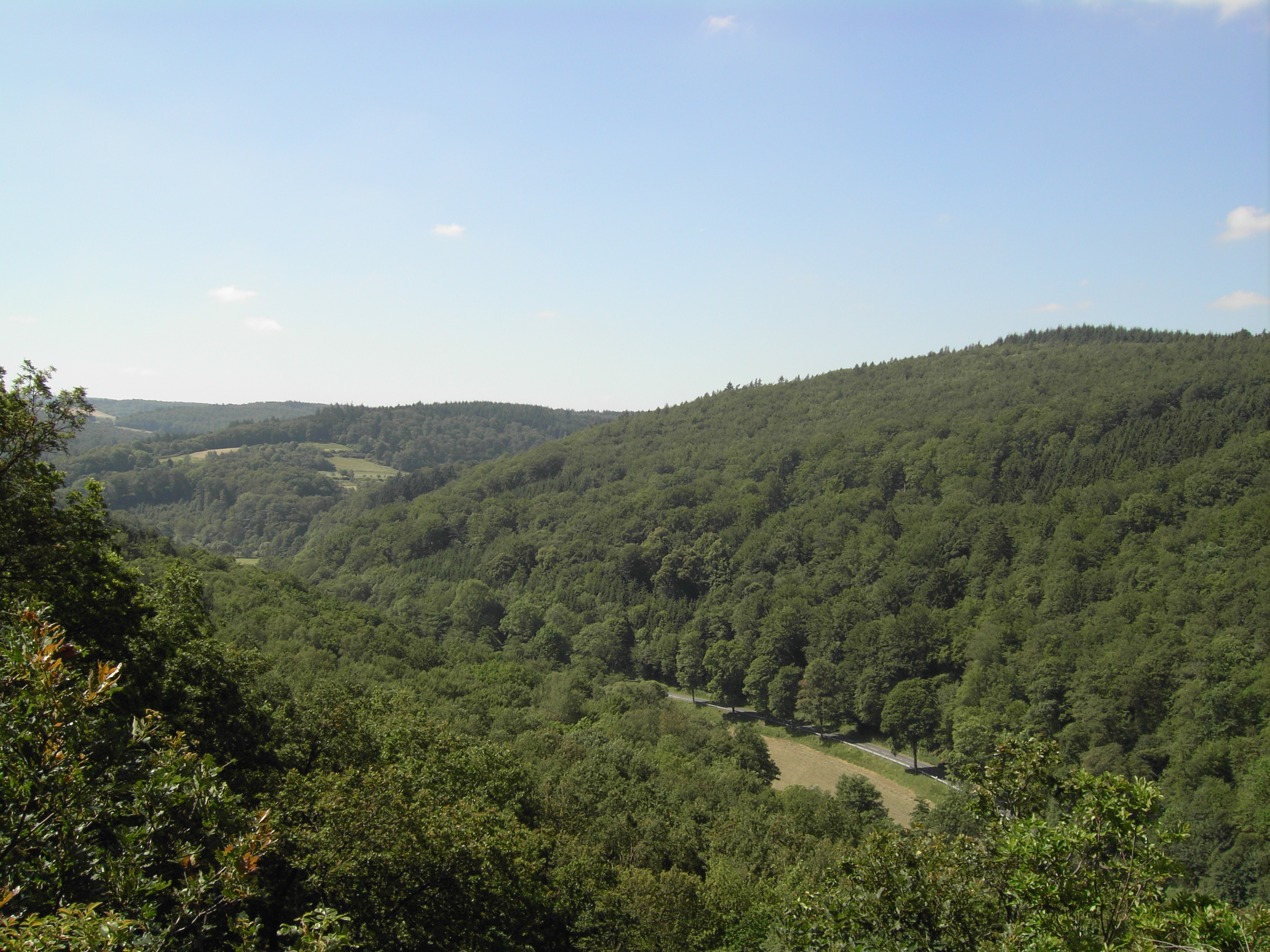
Weil valley

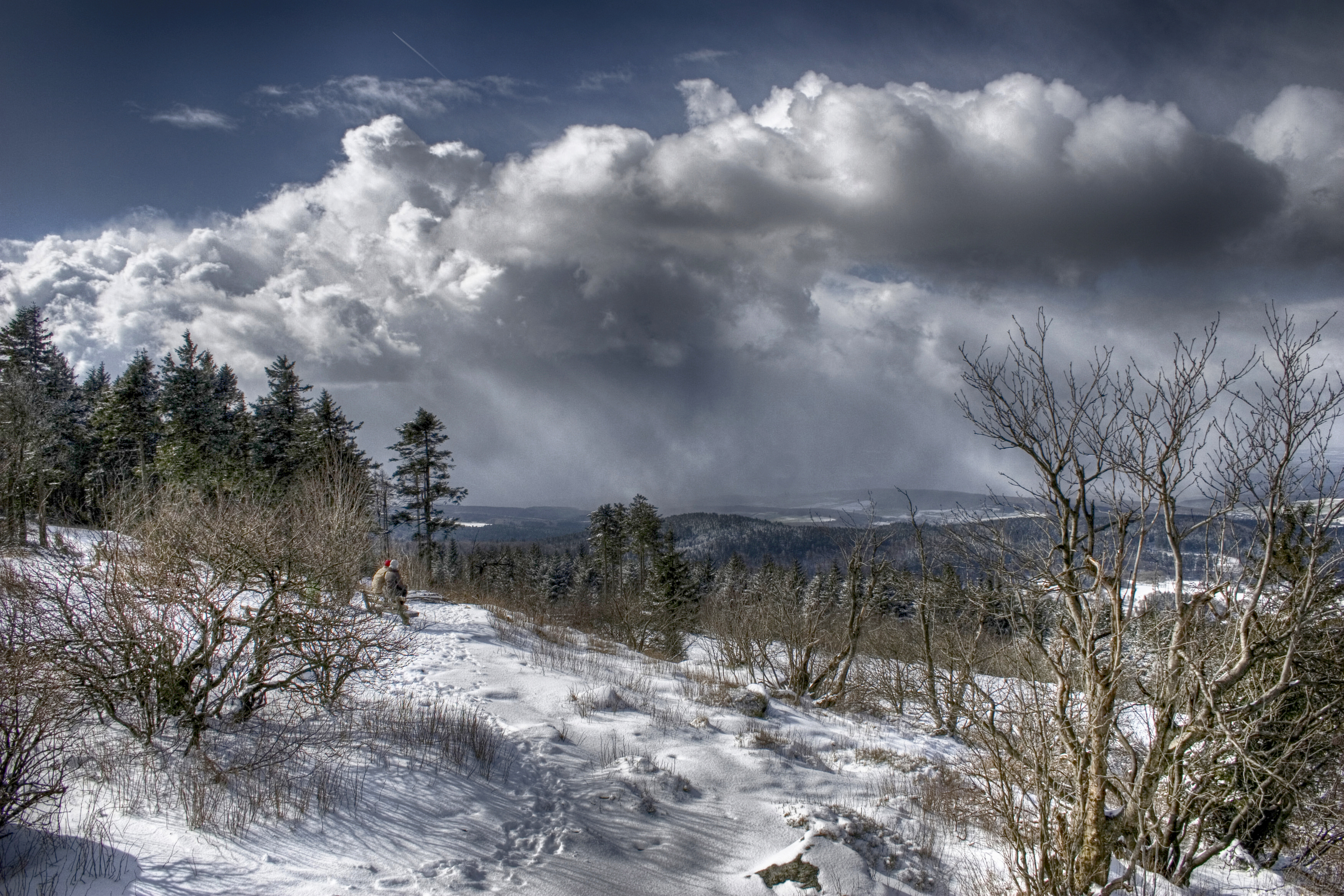
Großer Feldberg

The Taunus Nature Park (German: Naturpark Taunus) (until December 2012 called the High Taunus Nature Park or Naturpark Hochtaunus) is a nature park in Central Germany with an area of 134,775 hectares (1347.75 km^{2}) in the Central Upland range of the Taunus. It is one of two Hessian nature parks in the Taunus and the second largest nature park in Hesse.

== Location ==
The Taunus Nature Park stretches across the counties of Hochtaunuskreis, Lahn-Dill-Kreis, Limburg-Weilburg, Main-Taunus-Kreis, Wetteraukreis and Gießen. Its boundaries are identical with these counties except that, in the west, it is bounded by the A3 motorway, in the north roughly by the Lahn valley (but extends between Runkel and Weilburg over the Lahn into the Westerwald) and in the east by the A5 motorway. In the south it ends where the Main-Taunus Foreland between Frankfurt am Main and Wiesbaden begins. The park borders in the west on the Rhine-Taunus Nature Park.

The nature park covers the eastern half of the natural region of the High Taunus. This is where the main ridge of the Taunus runs with the highest peak in the range, the Großer Feldberg (881.5 m). Also part of the park and north of this ridge is the much larger Eastern Hintertaunus. Another part of the park is the Anterior Taunus, a narrow strip south of the ridge that descends to the Rhine-Main Plain. The original name of the park, "High Taunus", was thus not really accurate.

== Fauna ==
The High Taunus is sparsely settled and densely covered by coniferous forest. In the Eastern Hintertaunus, deciduous woods dominate. Characteristic of the Taunus with its rolling to high mountain relief are extensive scattered orchards, which occur mainly in the Anterior Taunus and on the eastern slopes facing the Wetterau.

== Sights ==
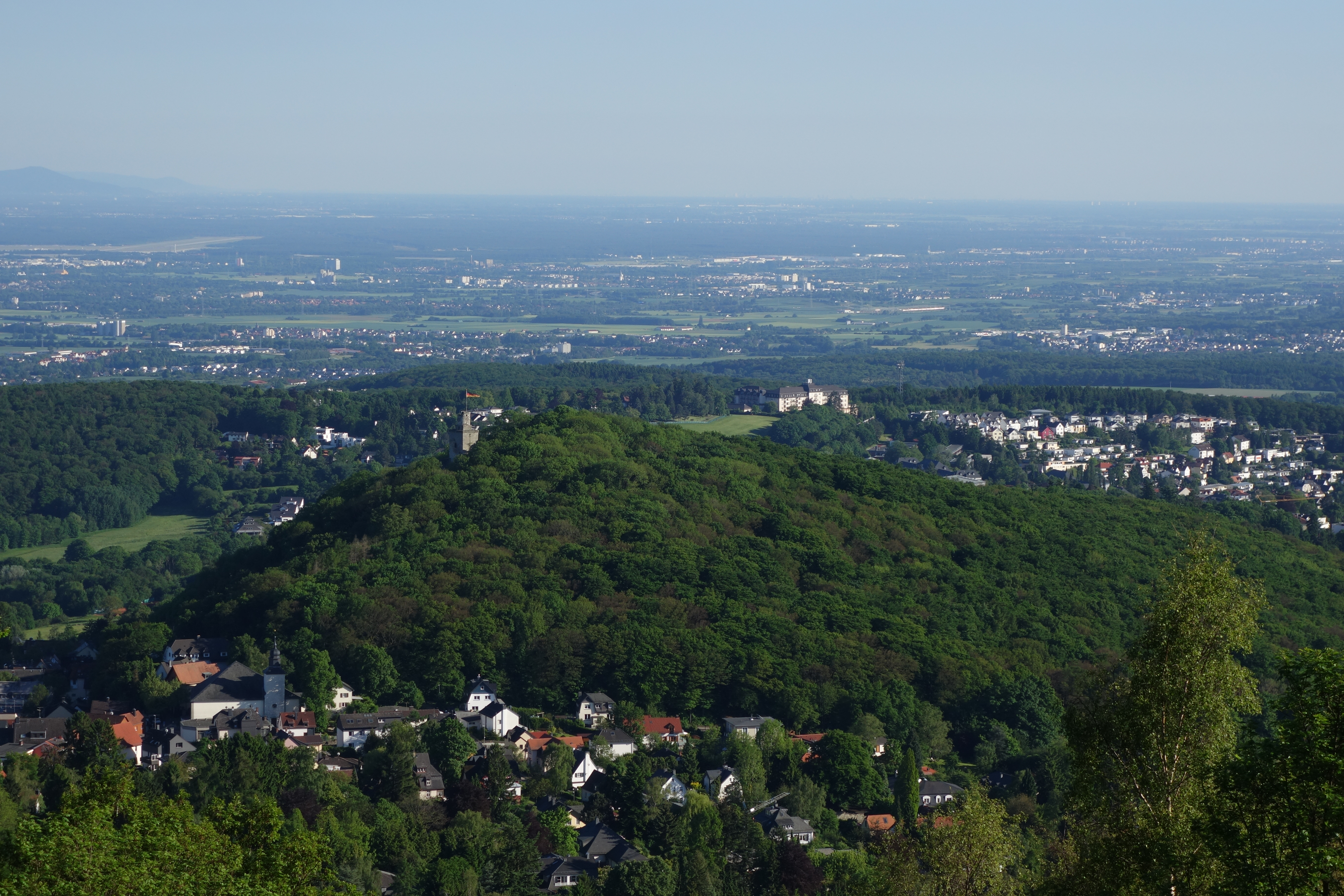
Falkenstein Castle on its hill as seen from a viewpoint at the foot of Altkönig mountain

=== Various ===
- Hessenpark Open-Air Museum – near Neu-Anspach
- Lochmühle Amusement Park – near Wehrheim
- Saalburg – near Bad Homburg vor der Höhe
- Eschbacher Klippen – near Usingen
- Kubach Crystal Cave – near Kubach
- Lahn Marble – a natural monument near Villmar
- Bad Camberg – historic town centre and Chapel of the Cross
- Braunfels – Braunfels Castle
- Königstein – Königstein Castle
- Falkenstein – ruins of Falkenstein Castle
- Kronberg – Kronberg Castle
- Weilburg – Schloss Weilburg
- Großer Feldberg – at 881.5 m above sea level (NHN) the highest point of the Taunus, near Schmitten-Oberreifenberg
- Weil Valley – source of the Weil by Kleiner Feldberg Roman Fort
- Opel Zoo – between Königstein and Kronberg
- Vogelburg – castle near Weilrod-Hasselbach
- Weilburg Wildlife Park – near Weilburg-Hirschhausen

=== Viewing towers ===
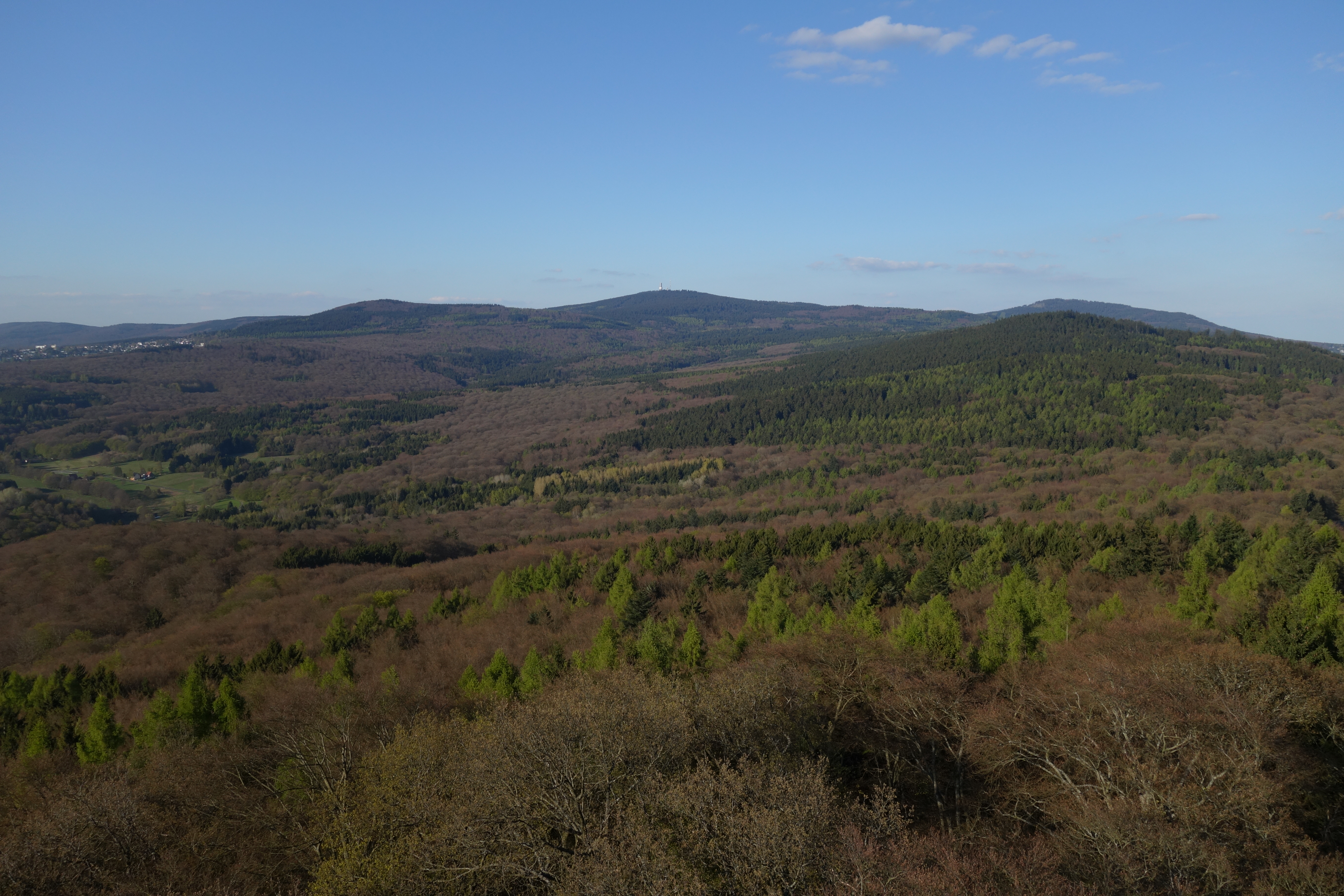
View from Atzelberg Tower along the main ridge of the Taunus with Eichkopf mountain on the right side in the middle. Behind ít (from the right): Altkönig, Großer Feldberg (with Kleiner Feldberg in front of it), Glaskopf, Hühnerberg and Windhain

There are several observation towers in the nature park on prominent mountains and hills:

(Name, Height in metres (m) above sea level (NHN), Location; Height from unless otherwise stated; alphabetically sorted)

- Atzelberg (506.7 m), Atzelberg Tower, near Eppenhain
- Gaulskopf (396.8 m), near Wehrheim-Pfaffenwiesbach
- Großer Feldberg (881.5 m), near Schmitten-Oberreifenberg
- Hausberg (485.7 m), near Butzbach-Hausen-Oes
- Hardtberg (408.7 m), near Königstein-Mammolshain
- Herzberg (591.4 m), near Bad Homburg vor der Höhe
- Kapellenberg (292.0 m), mit Meisterturm, bei Hofheim am Taunus
- Pferdskopf (662,6 m), bei Schmitten-Treisberg
- Stoppelberg (401,2 m), bei Wetzlar
- Winterstein (482,3 m), bei Wehrheim-Pfaffenwiesbach

== See also ==
- List of nature parks in Germany

== Literature ==
- Theodor Arzt, Erich Hentschel, Gertrud Mordhorst: Die Pflanzenwelt des Naturparks Hochtaunus. Institut für Naturschutz Darmstadt, Schriftenreihe Vol. IX, Issue 1, Darmstadt, 1967
- Gudrun Schirrmann: Wanderung im Naturpark Hochtaunus, Stuttgart und Hamburg 1981
- Eugen Ernst: HB Naturmagazin draußen "Naturpark Hochtaunus", Hamburg, 1983
- Zweckverband "Naturpark Hochtaunus": Parkplätze und Rundwanderwege im Naturpark Hochtaunus, Frankfurt, 1988
- Ingrid Berg, Eugen Ernst, Hans-Joachim Galuschka, Gerta Walsh: Heimat Hochtaunus, Frankfurt am Main, 1988, ISBN 3-7829-0375-7
- Alexander Stahr, Birgit Bender: Der Taunus-Eine Zeitreise, Stuttgart, 2007, ISBN 978-3-510-65224-2
- Stefan Jung: Wandern im Naturpark Hochtaunus, Frankfurt, 2009, ISBN 978-3-7973-1136-8
- Eugen Ernst: Der Taunus - Ein L(i)ebenswertes Mittelgebirge, Frankfurt, 2009, ISBN 978-3-7973-1146-7
