= Schloßborn =

- Ortsteil of Glashütten
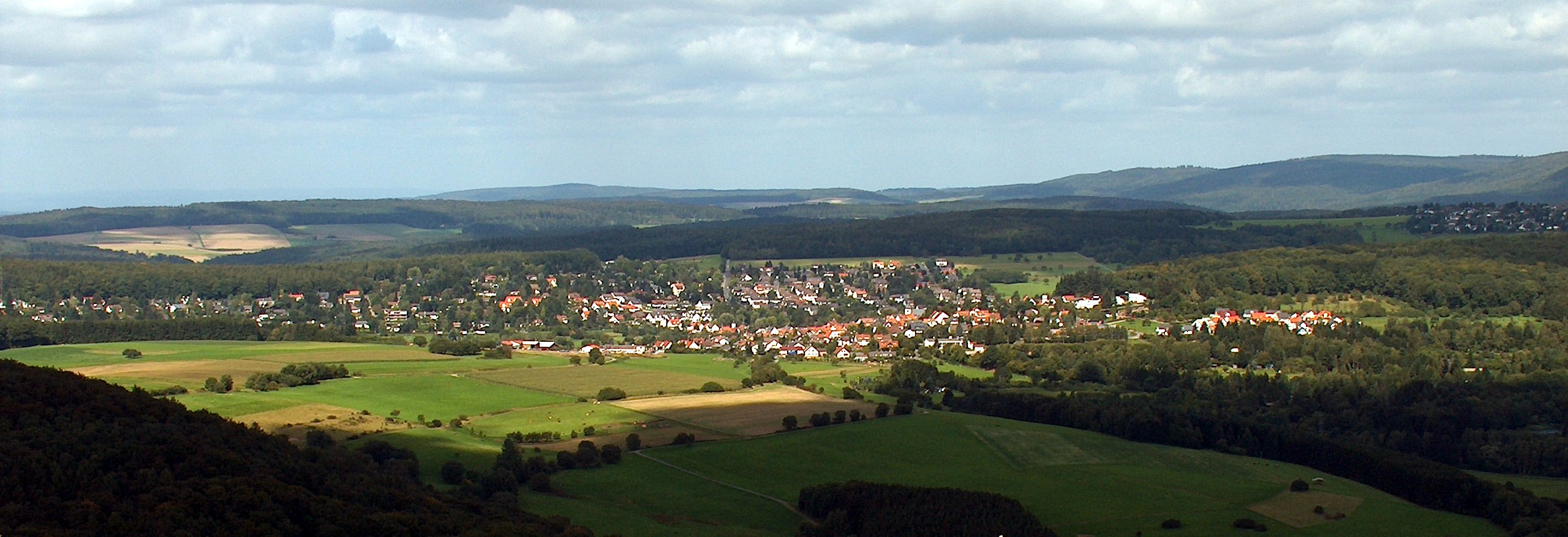

- Coat of arms
- Interactive map of Schloßborn
- Location within Germany Location within Hesse
- Coordinates: 50°11′54″N 8°22′55″E
- Country: Germany
- State: Hesse
- Admin. region: Darmstadt
- District: Hochtaunuskreis
- Municipality: Glashütten

Area
  - Total: 14.14 km^{2} (5.46 sq mi)
- Elevation: 373 m (1,224 ft)

Population (2020)
  - Total: 1,944
  - Density: 137.5/km^{2} (356.1/sq mi)
- Time zone: UTC+01:00 (CET)
  - Summer (DST): UTC+02:00 (CEST)
- Postal codes: 61479
- Dialling codes: 06174

Schloßborn (Schlossborn) is a village in the municipality of Glashütten, Hesse, Germany. It is located northeast of Wiesbaden and northwest of Frankfurt in the hilly Taunus region.

Neighboring communities are Königstein, Ruppertshain, Niederreifenberg, Heftrich, Ehlhalten and Glashütten. Schloßborn covers an area of 1,414 hectares.

== Geography ==
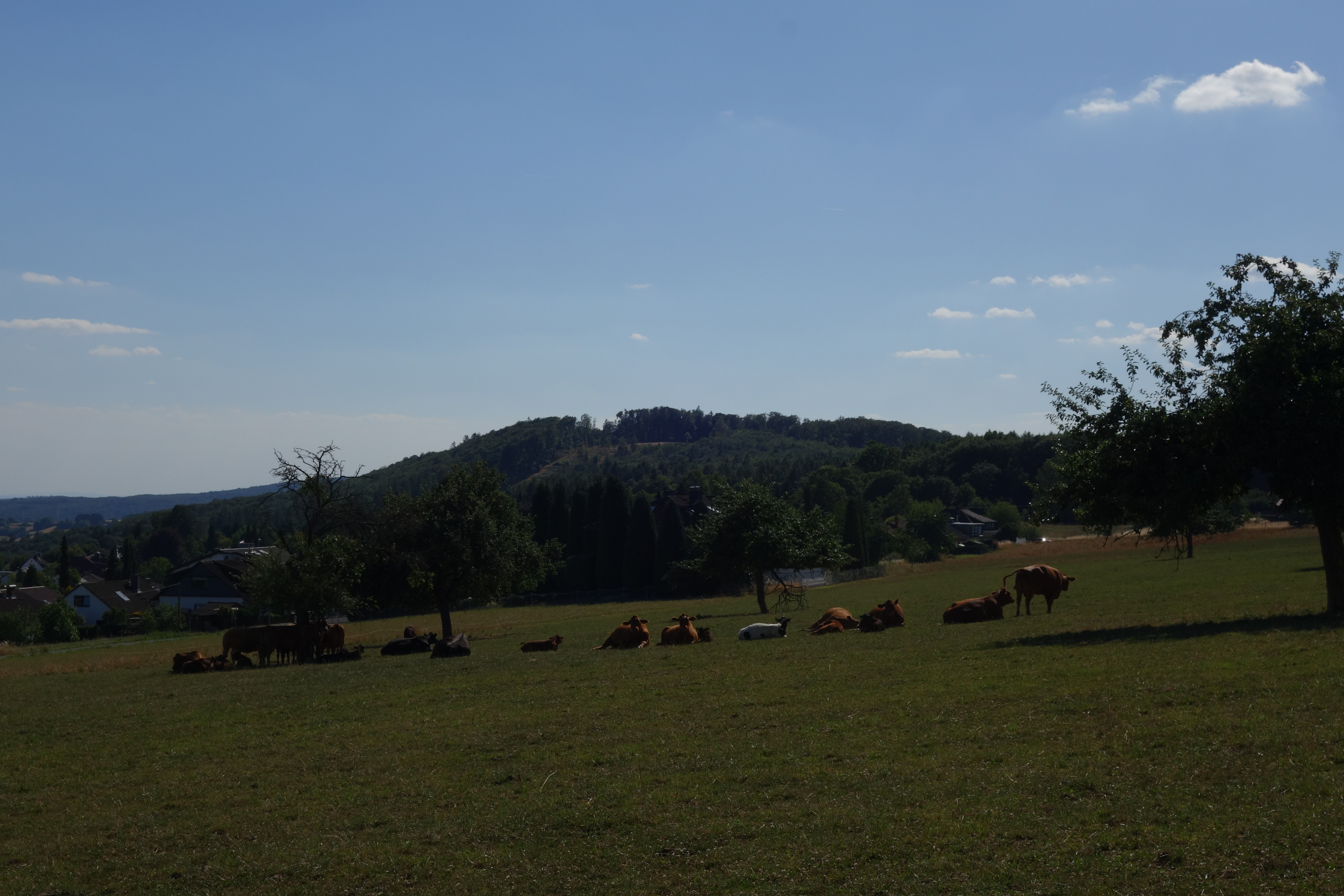
Mountain Butznickel as seen from northeast

Schloßborn lies within the Hochtaunus Nature Reserve, to the west of the 687-meter Glaskopf, watered by the springs in the Weiherbach Valley and the neighbouring Silberbach Valley. The village is surrounded by low mountains. The Steinkopf (570 meters), the Eickkopf (563 meters) and the Atzelberg (507 meters) lie to the south. To the southwest, between the village and the Dattenbach Valley, are the Platte (455 meters) and Spitzeberg (450 meters) and, to the west, the Butznickel (462 meters). Schloßborn is located on a Landesstraße, about three kilometers from Bundesstraße 8, connecting Frankfurt and Cologne.

== History ==
Schloßborn is probably the first recorded settlement in the Idsteiner Basin, in the area adjacent to the Goldene Grund. In Roman times, today's Schloßborn lay just behind the Limes on Roman territory. It then became a settlement for the Alamanni and the Franks. The first documented reference to Schloßborn was in the Bardo-Urkunde, a deed from 1043 in which Archbishop Bardo of Mainz established the boundaries of a large parish called Born. It is thought that by 980 a wooden church had been built there, commissioned by Bardo's predecessor, Archbishop Willigis. The parish comprised up to 24 settlements.

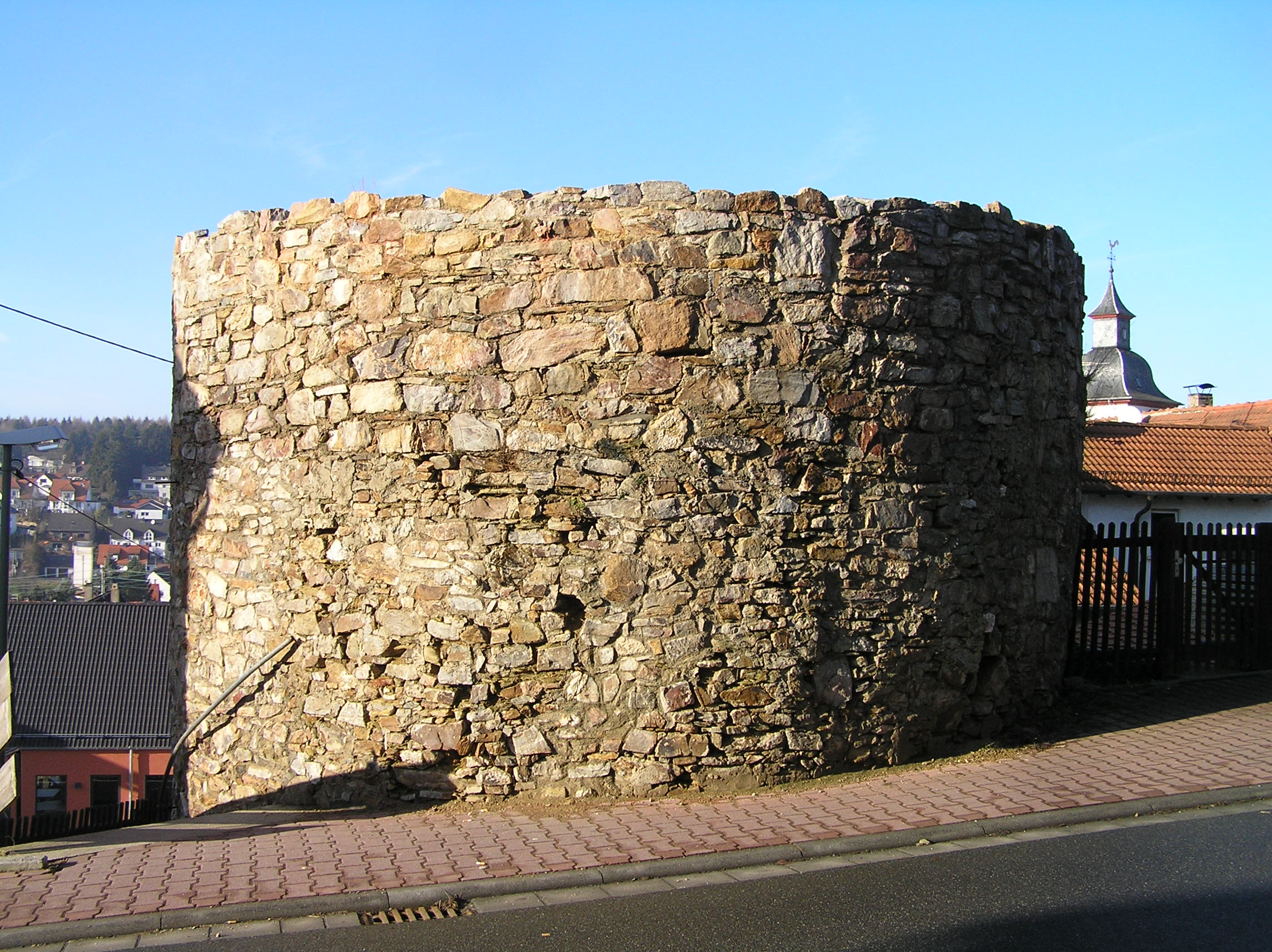
Tower

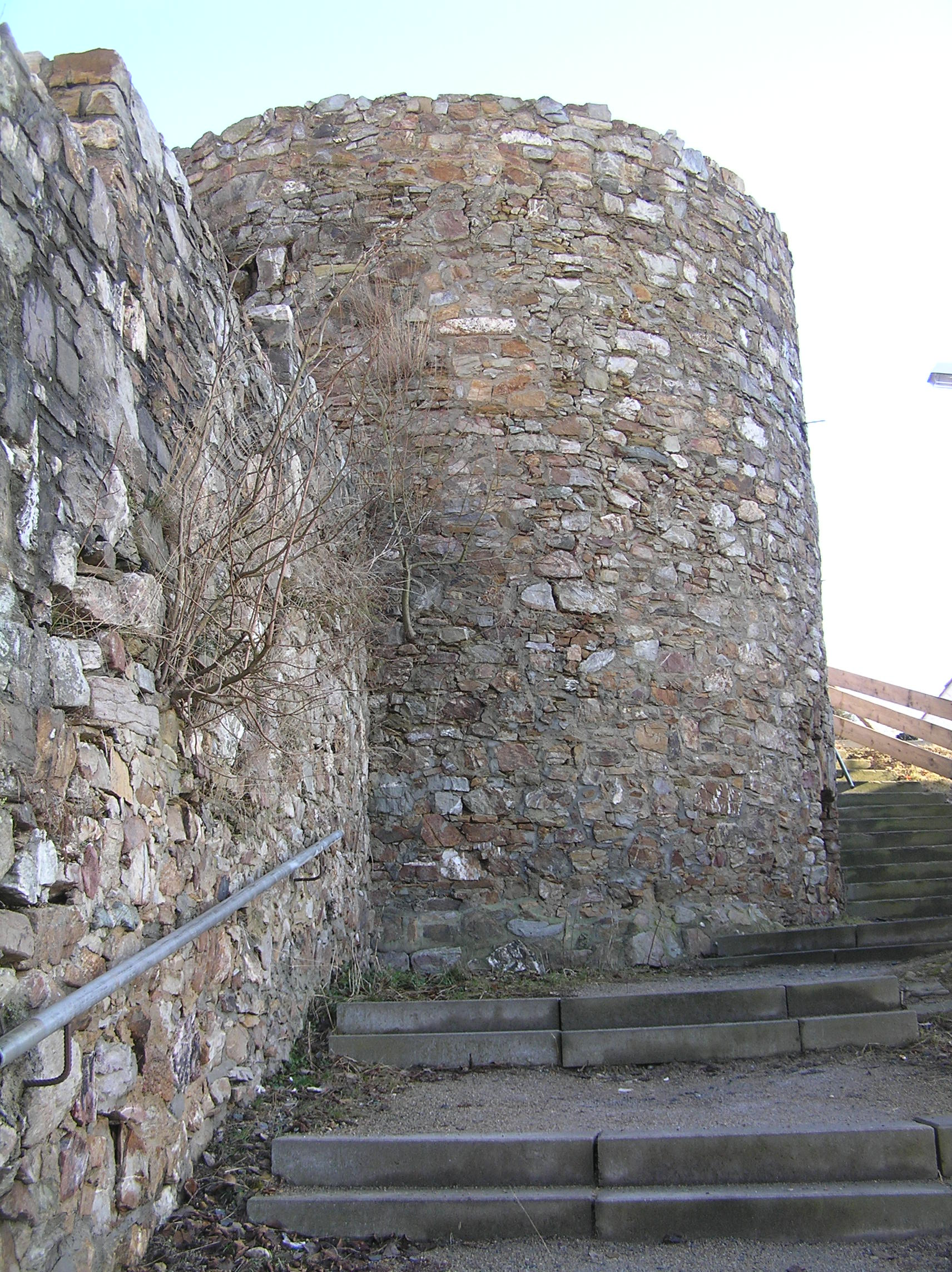
Tower and wall

In 1369, Count Eberhard I of Eppstein built a hunting lodge in Born; the remains of a tower and the surrounding wall are still preserved.

In 1564, the Reformation came to Born although in 1604, the village reverted to Catholicism under the Electorate of Mainz. In 1803, the Electorate ceased to exist under the German Mediatisation. From 1806, it belonged to the Duchy of Nassau as part of the Eppstein district. From 1 January 1810, Schloßborn was included in the Königstein district. In 1816 the name of the locality was changed from Born to Schloßborn (from Schloß (castle) and Born (spring)).

With the end of the Austro-Prussian War, Schloßborn became Prussian, part of the Obertaunuskreis (Upper Taunus district). After the defeat of the First World War, in late 1918 Schloßborn came under French rule during the Allied Occupation of the Rhineland in the district designated as Hilfskreis Königstein.

On 1 August 1972, under the Hesse territorial reform, Schloßborn became part of the municipality of Glashütten, moving from the Main-Taunus district into the Hochtaunus.

== Infrastructure and attractions ==
Schloßborn is home to the Catholic kindergarten Marienruhe, a primary school and a swimming pool. The primary school was opened in 2005. The old school house, which was also used as a town hall, is now a history museum.

In the center of Schloßborn is the Catholic church (1714), dedicated to apostles Philip and James. In the 1950s, it was enlarged with a new building on the vicarage side.

On the road to Kröftel (on the old sports field) there used to be a youth hostel, known as the Kreisjugendheim, operated by the Main-Taunus district. It was built during the Nazi era for the Gau of Rhein-Main-Lahn-Fulda. After 1945, for a period of many years, young people from Germany and abroad (mainly from France) went to Schloßborn on holiday, to relax, or to attend conferences. In the 1950s, the building also housed a few orphaned children from families in the Main-Taunus district under the leadership of social worker Sophie Schönig. It was renamed the Kennedyheim; The Beatles took a relaxation break there after a European tour. It remained in use until the 1970s but was later demolished and replaced by single-family homes. The remains of the old wall and a tower can still be seen.

=== Swimming pool ===
In the center of the village, there is a heated outdoor pool. A special attraction is the wide, wavy slide which can be used by several people at a time. Adjacent to the main pool, which is suitable for both swimmers and non-swimmers, there is a separate pool for small children. On the facility's lawn, there is a life-sized horse with a foal. Children can climb onto the two concrete animals which complement items in the two playgrounds.

== Notable people ==
- Wilhelm Kempf (1906-1982), bishop of Limburg, Ehrenbürger (honorary citizen).
- Norbert Kühne (born 1941), German writer and psychologist who lived in Schloßborn from 1951 to 1963
