= Atzelberg Tower =

- Atzelbergturm
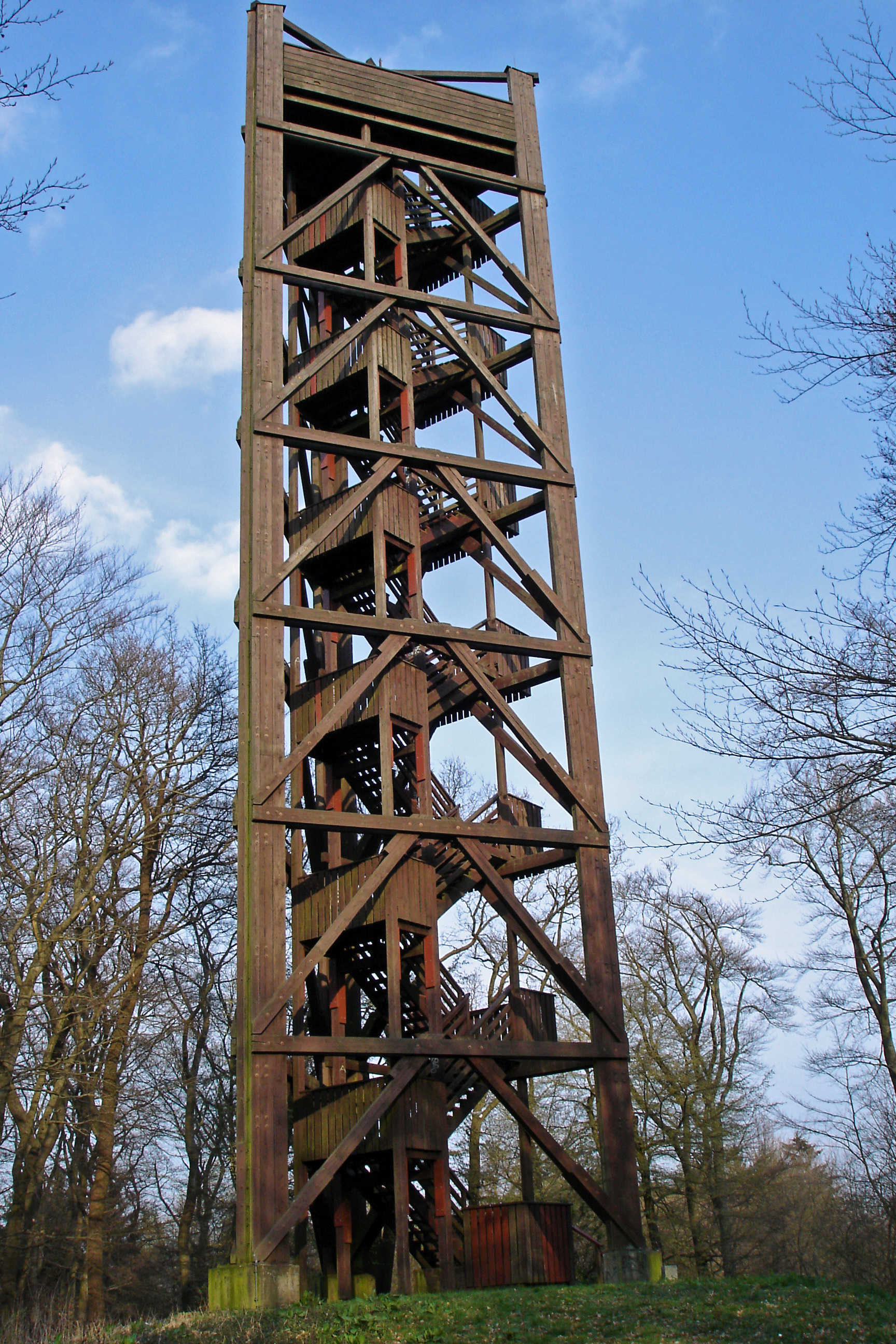
- The wooden Atzelberg Tower on the summit of Atzelberg.

- Location within Germany

General information
- Status: Destroyed
- Type: Lattice observation tower
- Location: Kelkheim, Main-Taunus-Kreis, Hesse, Germany
- Coordinates: 50.173737°N 8.386642°E
- Construction started: 1980
- Completed: 1980
- Opening: 1980
- Demolished: 5 August 2008

Height
- Roof: 31 m (102 ft)
- Top floor: 30.39 m (100 ft)

Technical details
- Floor count: 6

Atzelberg Tower (German: Atzelbergturm), also known as Atzelberg Observation Tower for long, was a 30.39 m-high (99.7 ft) German wooden lattice observation tower that was located on the summit of the 506.7 m-high (1,662 ft) mountain of Atzelberg. The Atzelberg Tower had a floor count of 6 floors including both the ground floor and the top. The Atzelberg Tower's top floor measured 30.39 m (99.7 ft) above sea level. The tower also had a roof which measured 31 m (102 ft) from the ground. The observation tower's top floor can only be reached through its 150-stepped staircases. The tower was used from the year of its construction, 1980, until 5 August 2008, when it was ravaged by fire that was caused by arson, as an observation tower on the top of the Atzelberg, which provided viewers and/or observers a good view of the surrounding areas.

== History ==
The Atzelberg Tower's construction was commenced in 1980, finishing the construction in the same year. The tower was then destroyed 28 years later, specifically, on 5 August 2008, by fire that was caused by arson, since the number of criminals and vandals that year also rose.

== Geography ==
The Atzelberg Tower was situated on the summit of the 506.7 m-high (1,662 ft) mountain, Atzelberg, which in turn is located in the town of Kelkheim, in the kreis (district) of Main-Taunus, in the state of Hesse, in Germany.

== Gallery ==
Click on the thumbnail to enlarge.

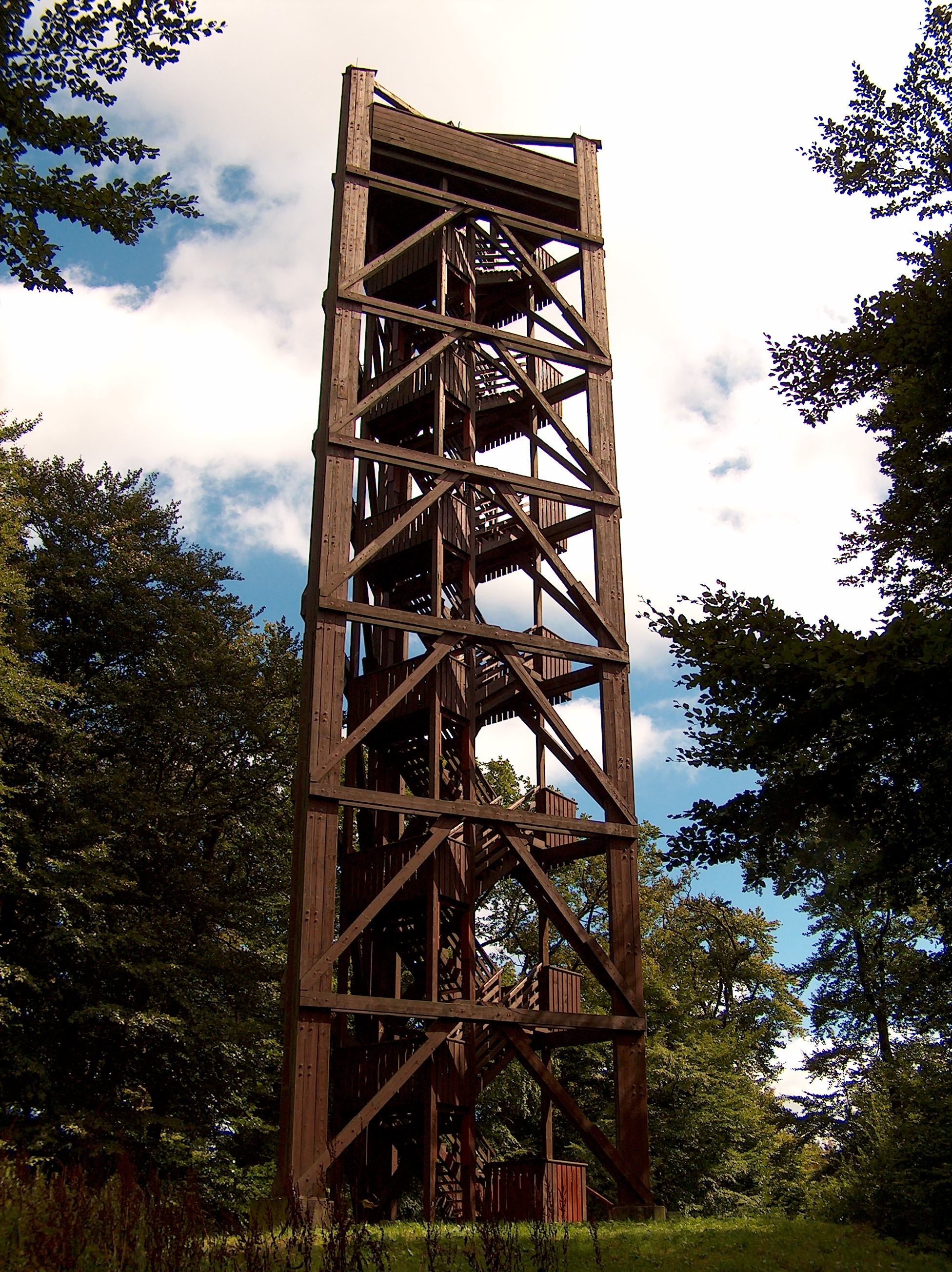
The Atzelberg Tower.

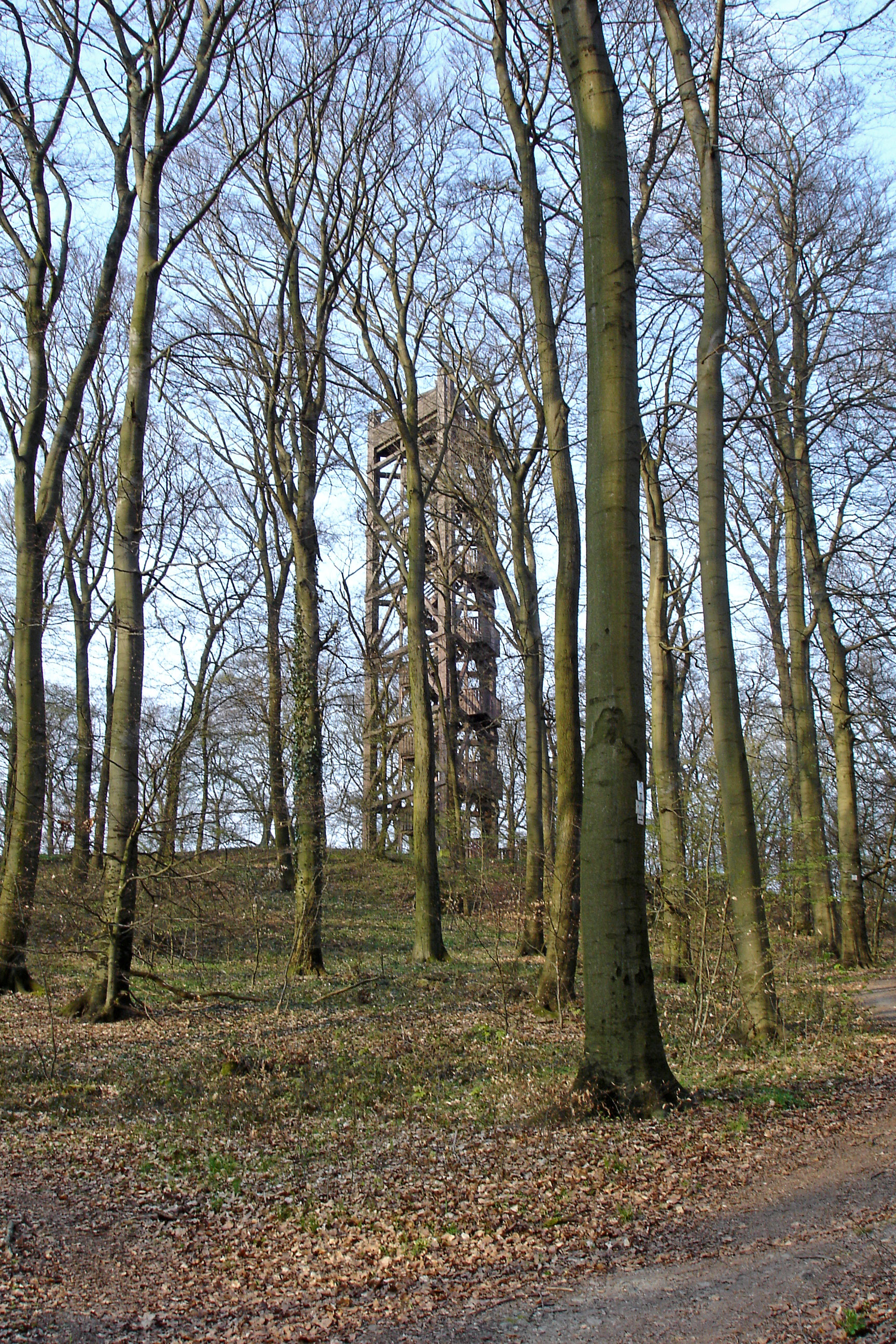
The Atzelberg Tower (background) and the forest (foreground) that surrounds it.

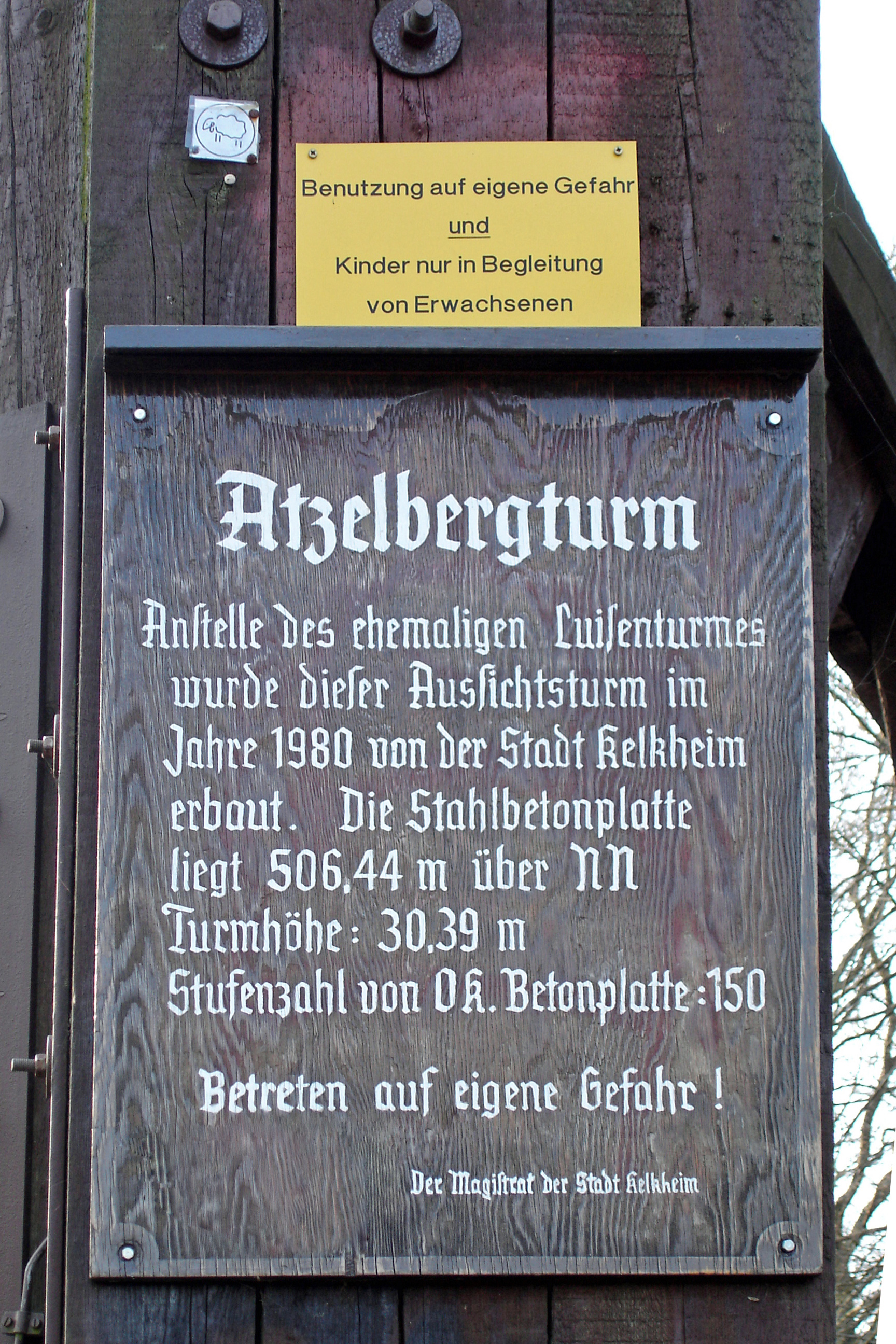
A note on a billboard at the foot of the Atzelberg Tower.

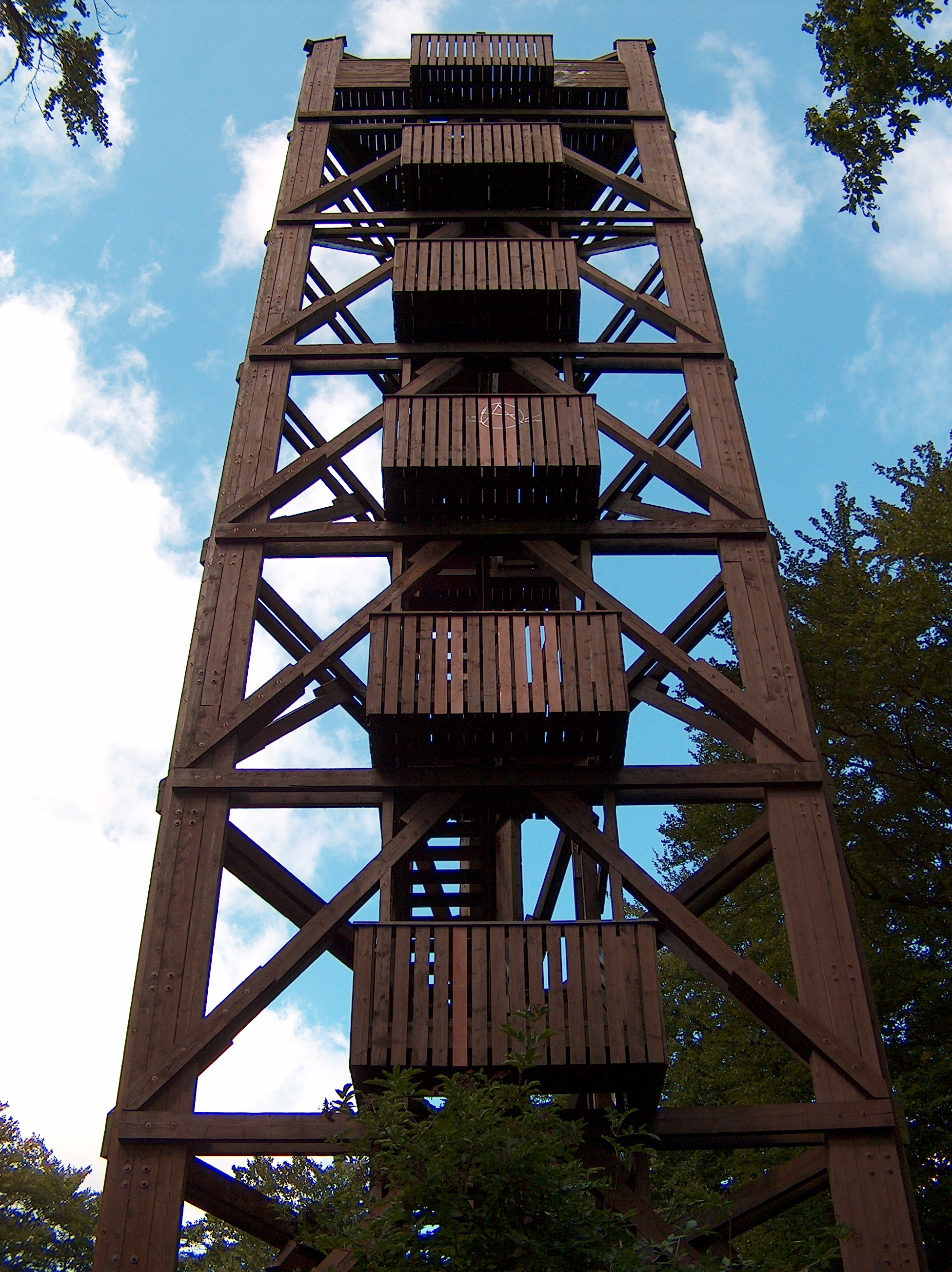
Full front view of the Atzelberg Tower show its 150-stepped staircases.

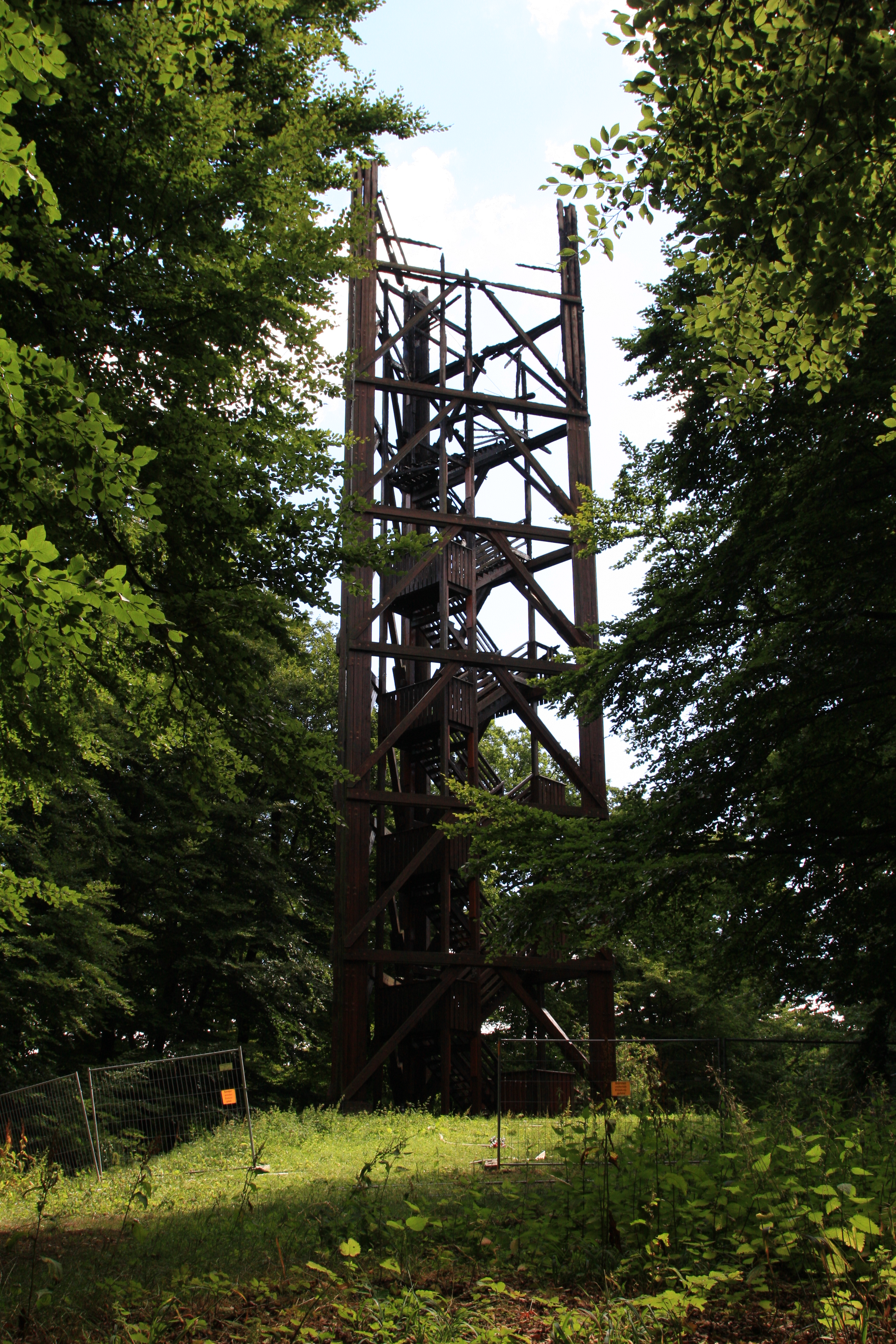
The Atzelberg Tower as a whole after the fire.

== See also ==
- Lattice tower
- List of tallest towers in the world
- Kelkheim
- Atzelberg
