= Main ridge of the Taunus =

Coordinates: 50°10′29″N 8°18′18″E

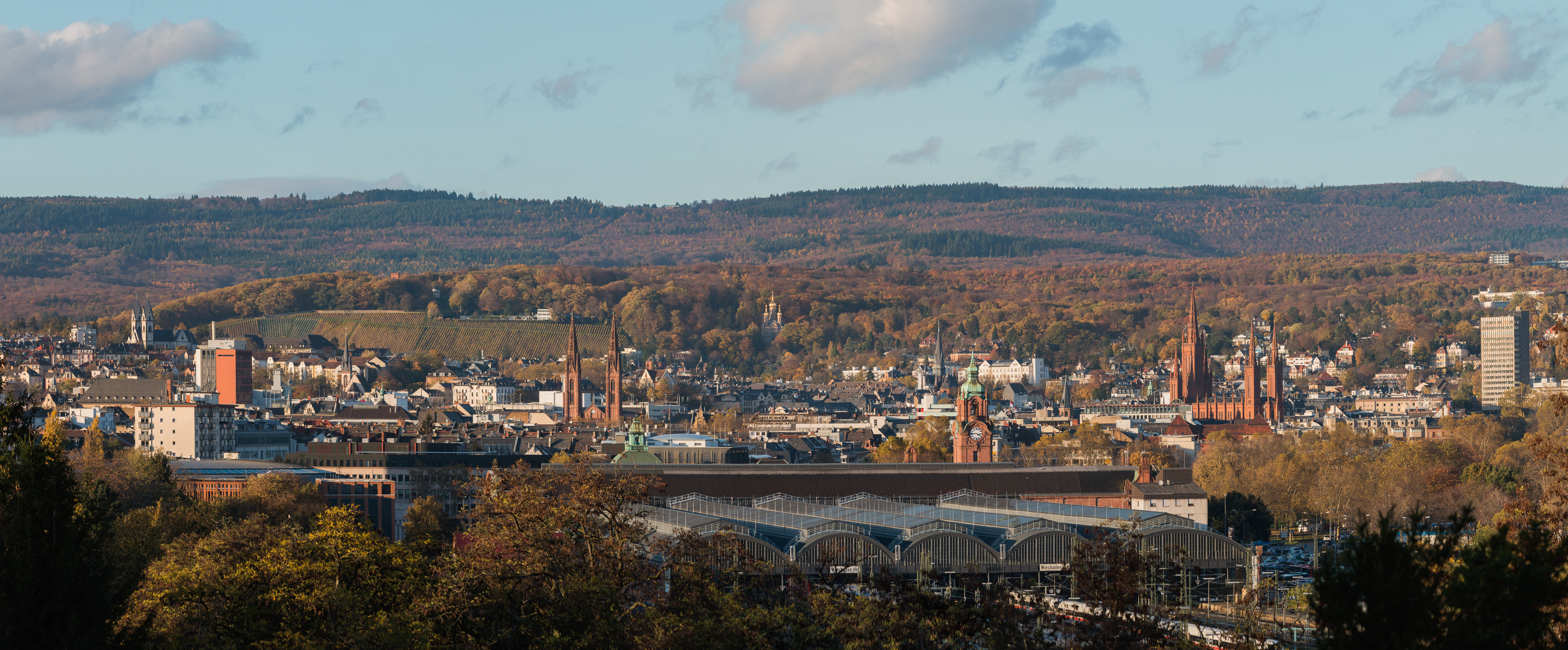
The Anterior Taunus and Taunus main ridge near Wiesbaden

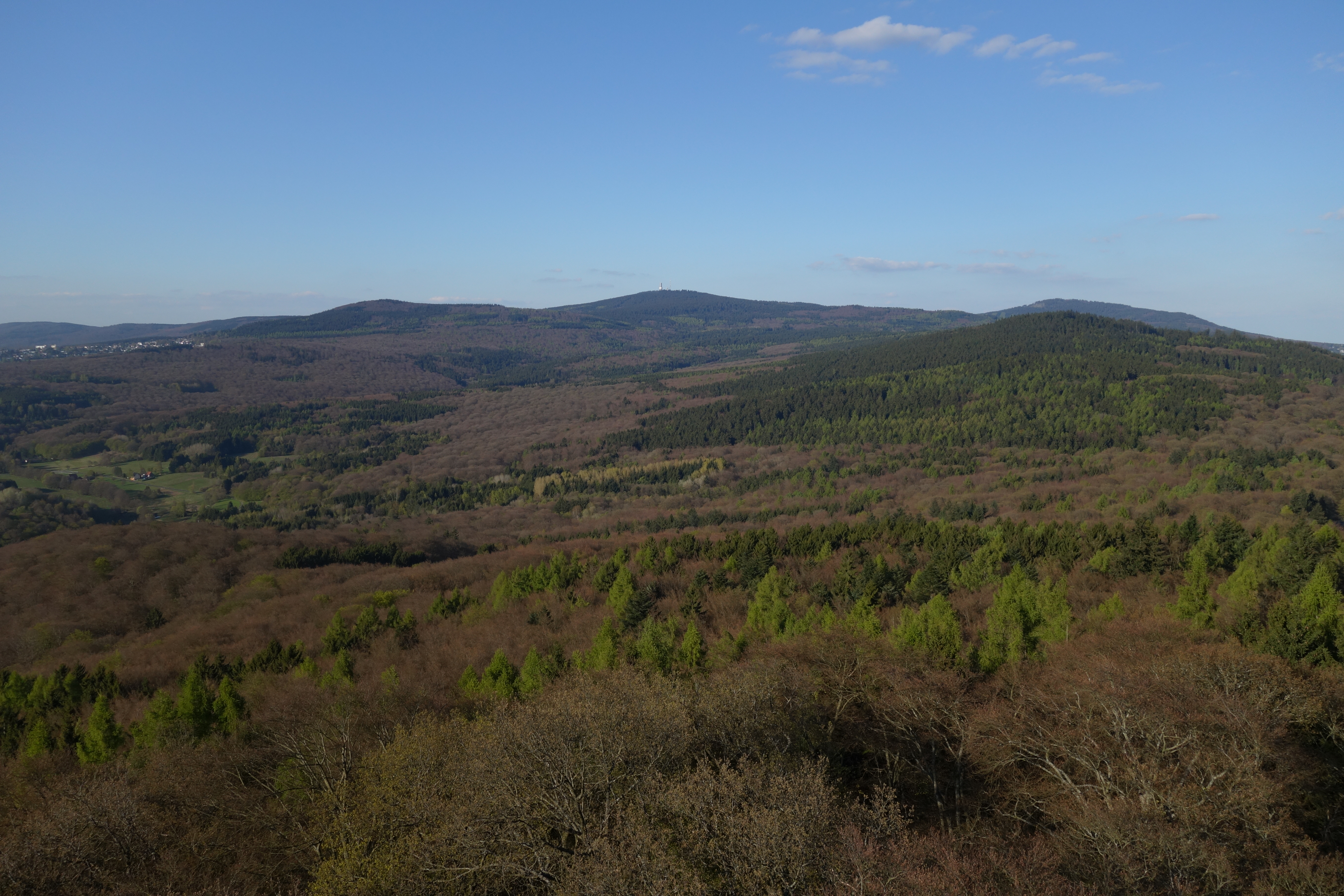
View from Atzelberg along the main ridge with Großer Feldberg in the center of the background

The main ridge of the Taunus (German: Taunushauptkamm) is a 75-kilometre-long ridgeline in the High Taunus mountain in Germany, whose geological core consists of veins of hard Taunus quartzite. The ridge separates the steeply descending Anterior Taunus to the south from the more gradually descending upland of the Hintertaunus or Farther Taunus in the north. The watershed between the Upper Rhine and River Main to the south and the Middle Rhine tributaries of the Wisper and Lahn to the north, runs for long sections along the main ridge. Several of the rivers flowing southwards have broken through the rock of the Taunus ridge unit in several places so the watershed is diverted a few kilometres to the north.

The main ridge of the Taunus is also a watershed that, especially in the cooler six months of the year and during inversion weather conditions, separates the fog in the Upper Rhine Plain from clearer weather in the north. When the prevailing winds are from the northwest, the ridge receives a lot of precipitation and shelters the Rhine-Main region, giving it a mild climate.

== Route ==
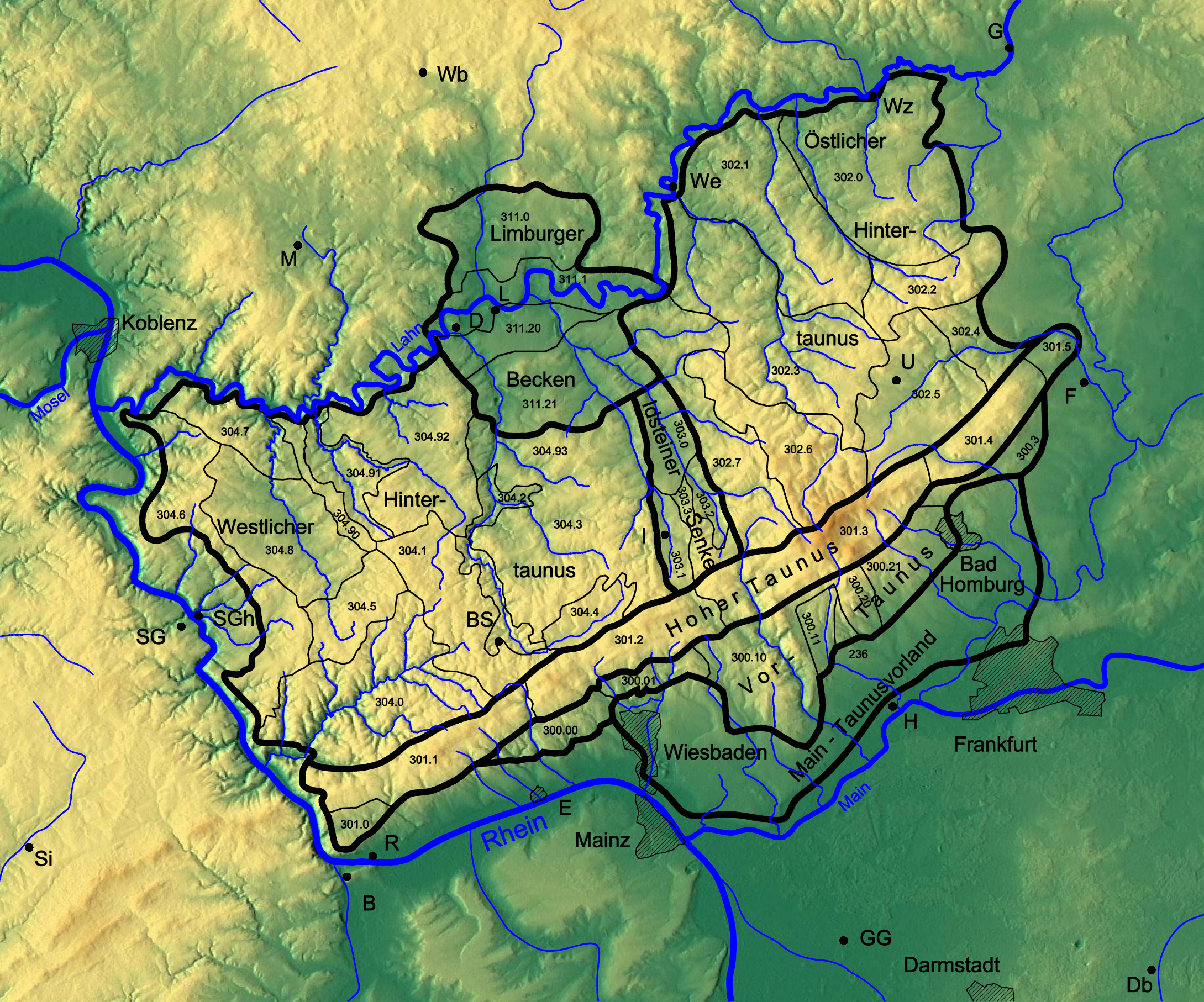
Natural regions of the Taunus

The main crest of the Taunus runs from southwest to northeast from the Middle Rhine to the Wetterau in the following natural region sections:

- 301 High Taunus
  - 301.0 Niederwald
  - 301.1 Rheingau Hills (Rheingaugebirge)
  - 301.2 Wiesbaden High Taunus
  - 301.3 Feldberg-Taunus Crest
  - 301.4 Winterstein-Taunus Crest
  - 301.5 Nauheim Taunus Spur

The main ridge of the Taunus incorporates the crest of the Hunsrück west of the Rhine and the heights of Bingen Forest.

== Literature ==
- Alexander Stahr, Birgit Bender: Der Taunus-Eine Zeitreise. Stuttgart, 2007, ISBN 978-3-510-65224-2
- Eugen Ernst: Der Taunus – Ein L(i)ebenswertes Mittelgebirge. Frankfurt, 2009, ISBN 978-3-7973-1146-7
- Alexander Stahr: Die Böden des Taunuskamms. Entwicklung-Verbreitung-Nutzung-Gefährdung. Munich, 2014, ISBN 978-3-8993-7180-2
