= Anterior Taunus =

Anterior Taunus Vordertaunus
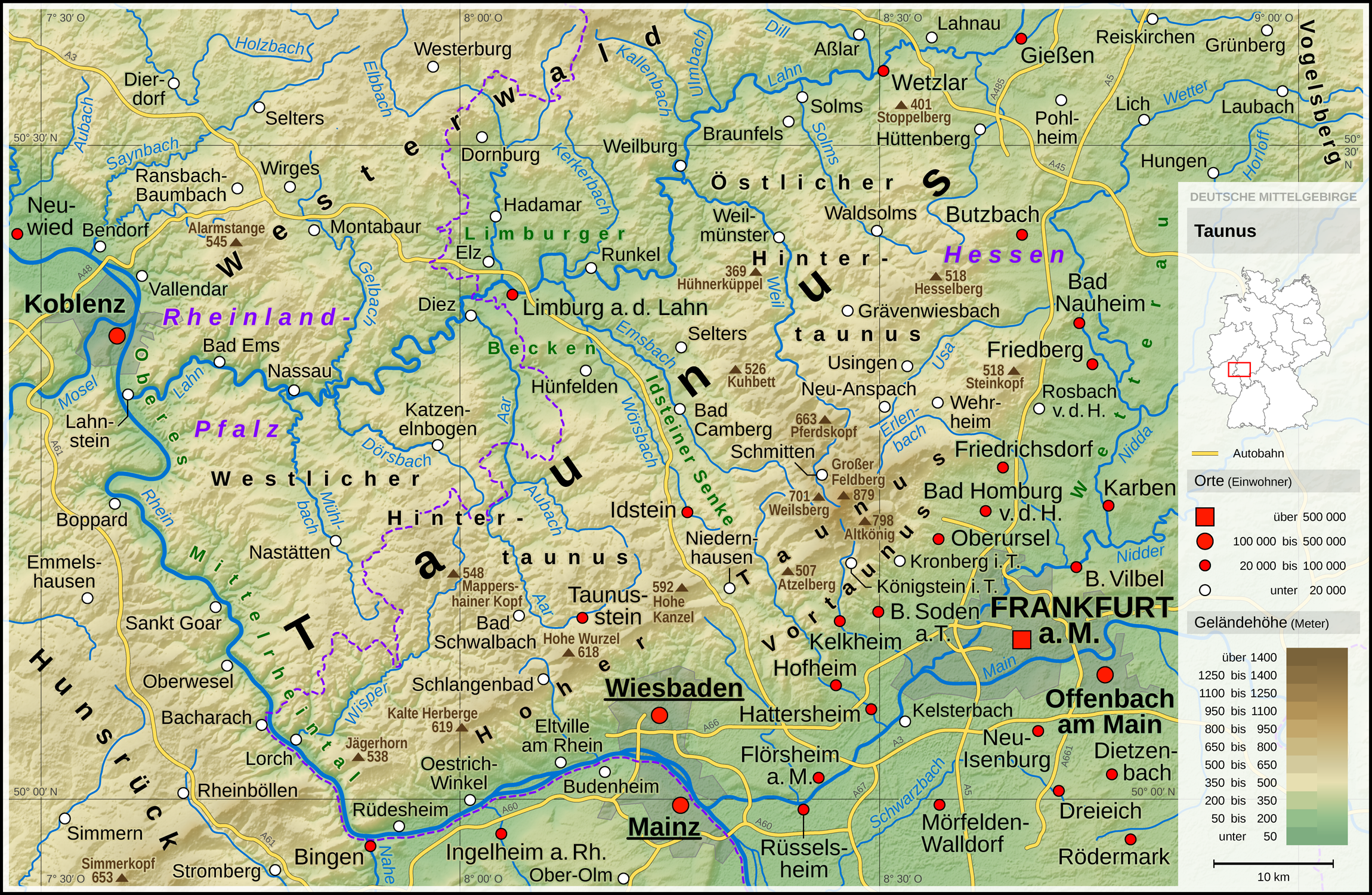
- Overview map of the Taunus

Highest point
- Peak: Rossert
- Elevation: 516 m above NN

Dimensions
- Area: 218.90 km^{2} (84.52 mi^{2})

Geography
- State: Hesse
- Range coordinates: 50°09′53″N 8°23′57″E
- Parent range: Taunus

Geology
- Orogeny: Hill range
- Rock type(s): Phyllite, greenschist and mica-gneisses

The Anterior Taunus (German: Vordertaunus or Vortaunus) is a natural region within the Hessian Central Upland range of the Taunus (major unit group 30) in Germany that lies south of the High Taunus (301). The region lies below the main ridge of the Taunus.

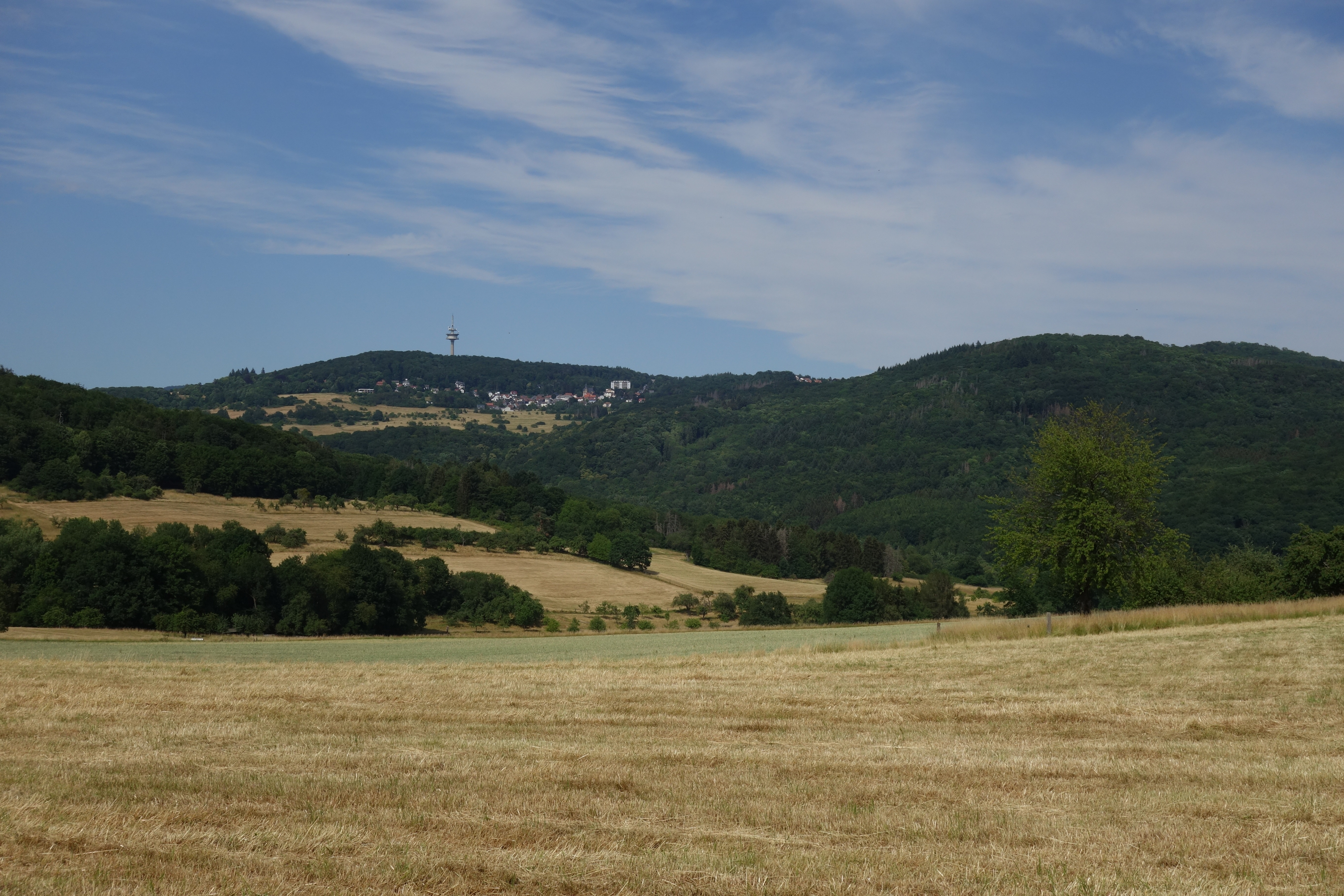
The Rossert hilltop Hainkopf on the right belongs to the Anterior Taunus, Atzelberg mountain on the left is part of the High Taunus

== Literature ==
- Reimer Herrmann: Vergleichende Hydrogeographie des Taunus und seiner südlichen und südöstlichen Randgebiete. Wilhelm Schmitz Verlag, Gießen, 1965, DNB-IDN 451978870.
- Eugen Ernst: Naturpark Hochtaunus. (HB Naturmagazin draußen). Hamburg, 1983.
- Ingrid Berg, Eugen Ernst, Hans-Joachim Galuschka, Gerta Walsh: Heimat Hochtaunus. Frankfurt am Main, 1988, ISBN 3-7829-0375-7.
- Alexander Stahr, Birgit Bender: Der Taunus – Eine Zeitreise. Borntraeger-Verlag, Stuttgart, 2007, ISBN 978-3-510-65224-2.
- Eugen Ernst: Der Taunus – Ein L(i)ebenswertes Mittelgebirge. Frankfurt, 2009, ISBN 978-3-7973-1146-7.
