= Rossert =

Mountain in Germany

Coordinates: 50°10′N 8°24′E

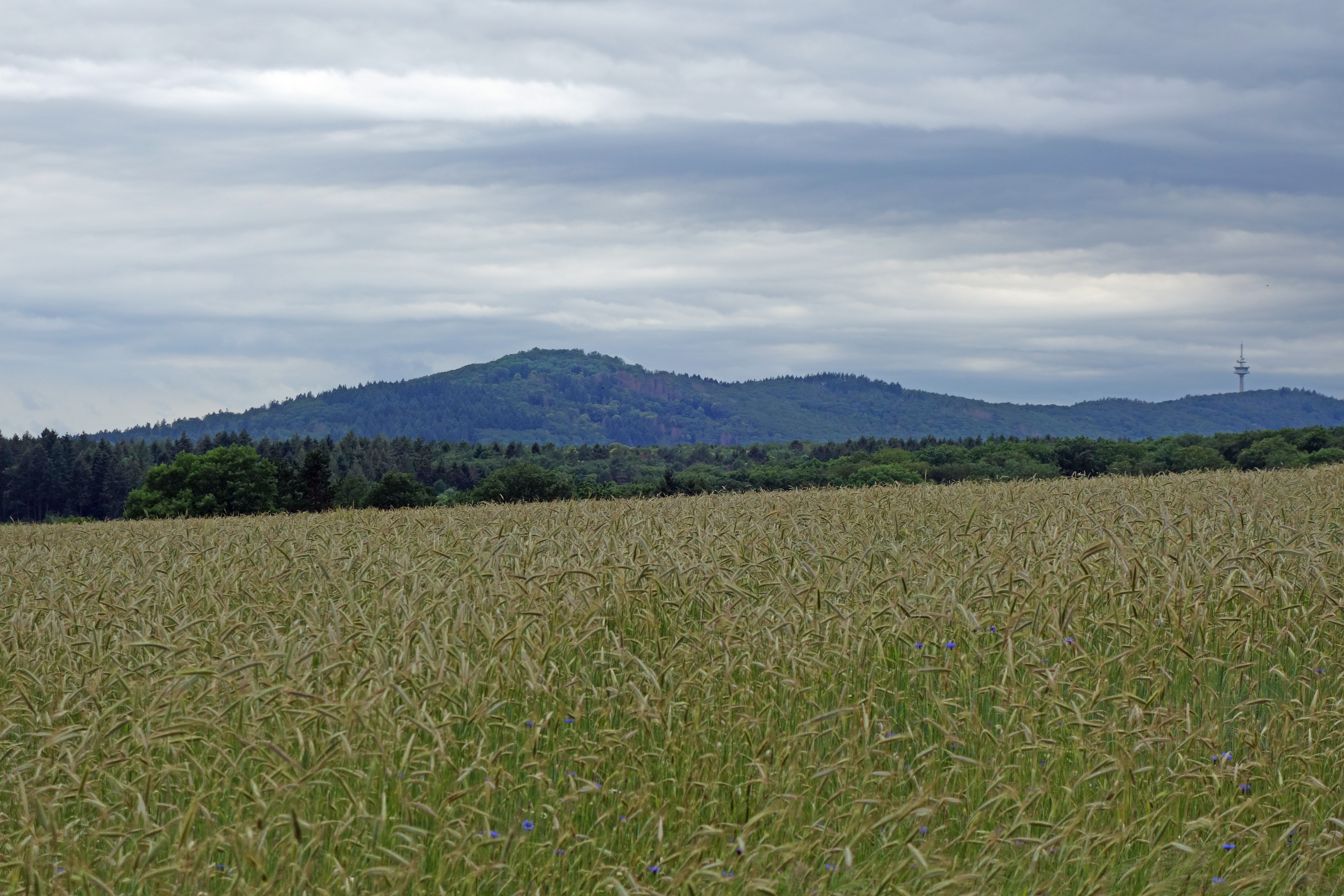
- Rossert and nameless hilltop, on the right Atzelberg with network tower (seen from the east)

Highest point
- Elevation: 516 m (1,693 ft)

Geography
- Location: Hesse, Germany

Rossert is a mountain of the Taunus, part of the Anterior Taunus, in Hesse, Germany. The mountain consists of a few hilltops, two of them giving the name the Naturschutzgebiet (protected area) Rossert - Hainkopf - Dachsbau. Between them lies Eppenhain, a constituent community of Kelkheim. The name Rossert originates from an Old High German word for cobblestones. The mountain is 516 metres (1,693 ft) tall.

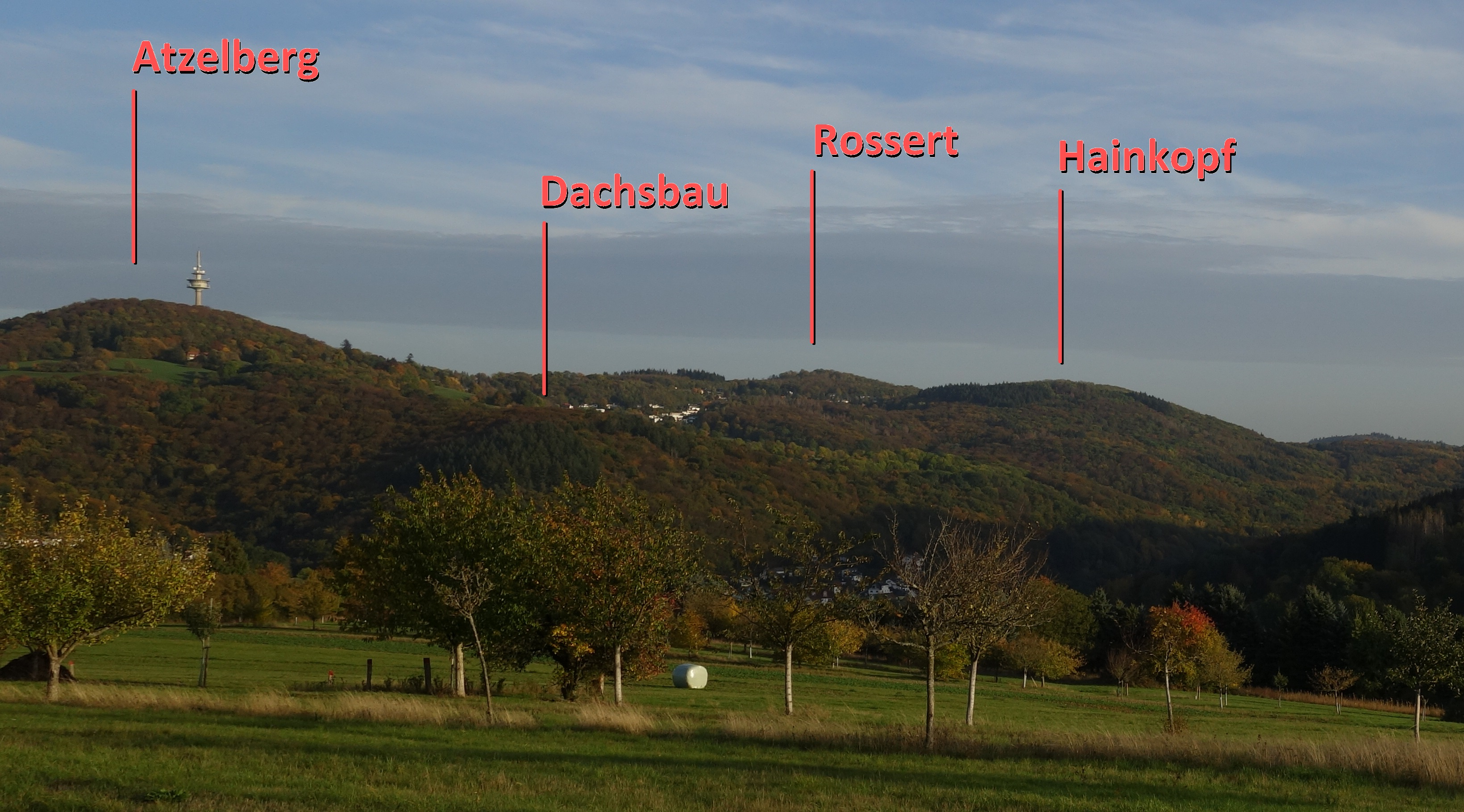
Nature reserve Rossert - Hainkopf - Dachsbau (seen from the northwest)
