= Kellerskopf (Taunus) =

Hill in Hesse, Germany

Coordinates: 50°08′15″N 8°17′02″E

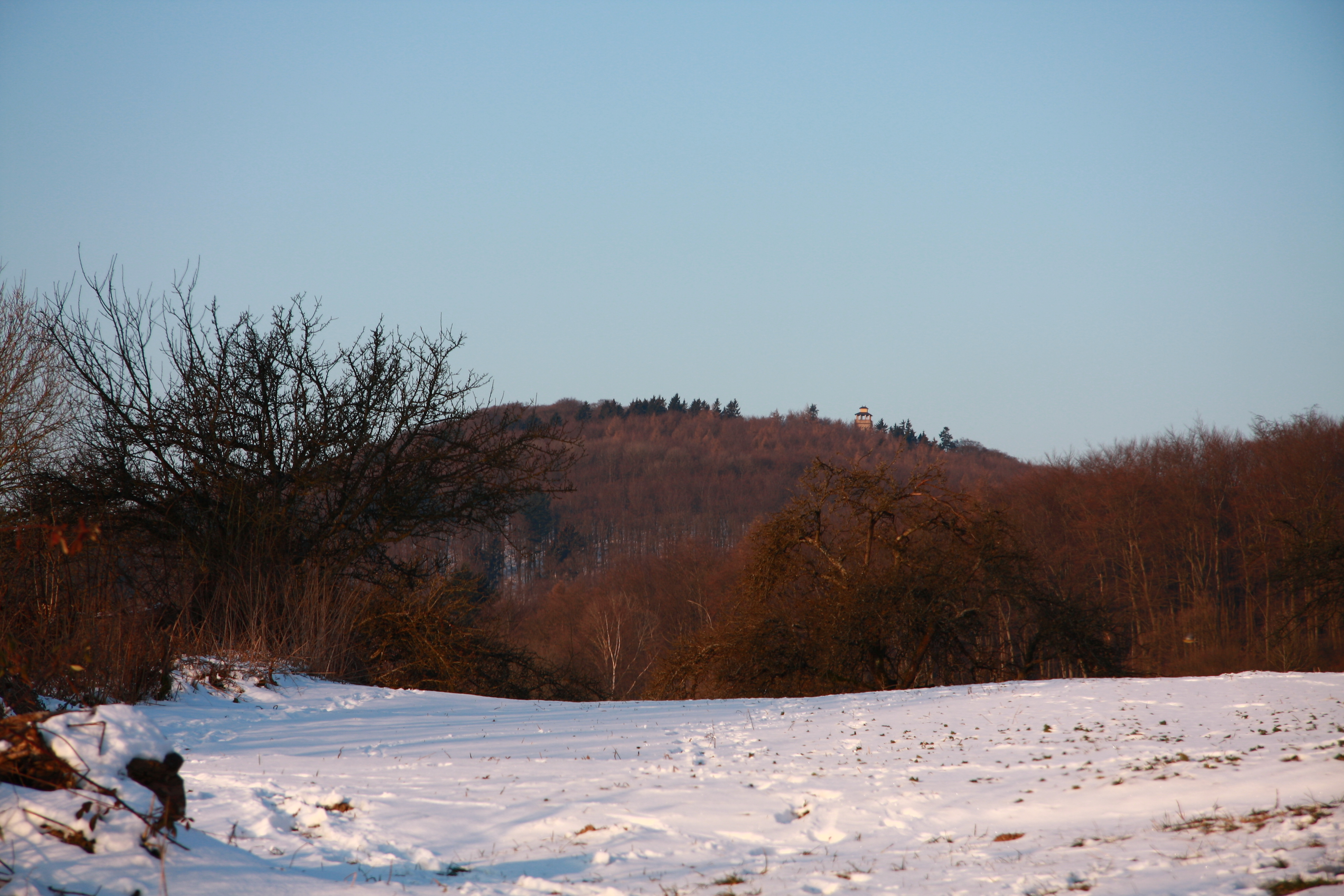
- The Hessian Mountain Kellerskopf in the Taunus mountain range

Highest point
- Elevation: 474 m (1,555 ft)

Geography
- Location: Hesse, Germany

Kellerskopf is a hill of Hesse, Germany.
