= Kolbenberg =

Mountain in Hesse, Germany

Coordinates: 50°14′30″N 8°29′45″E

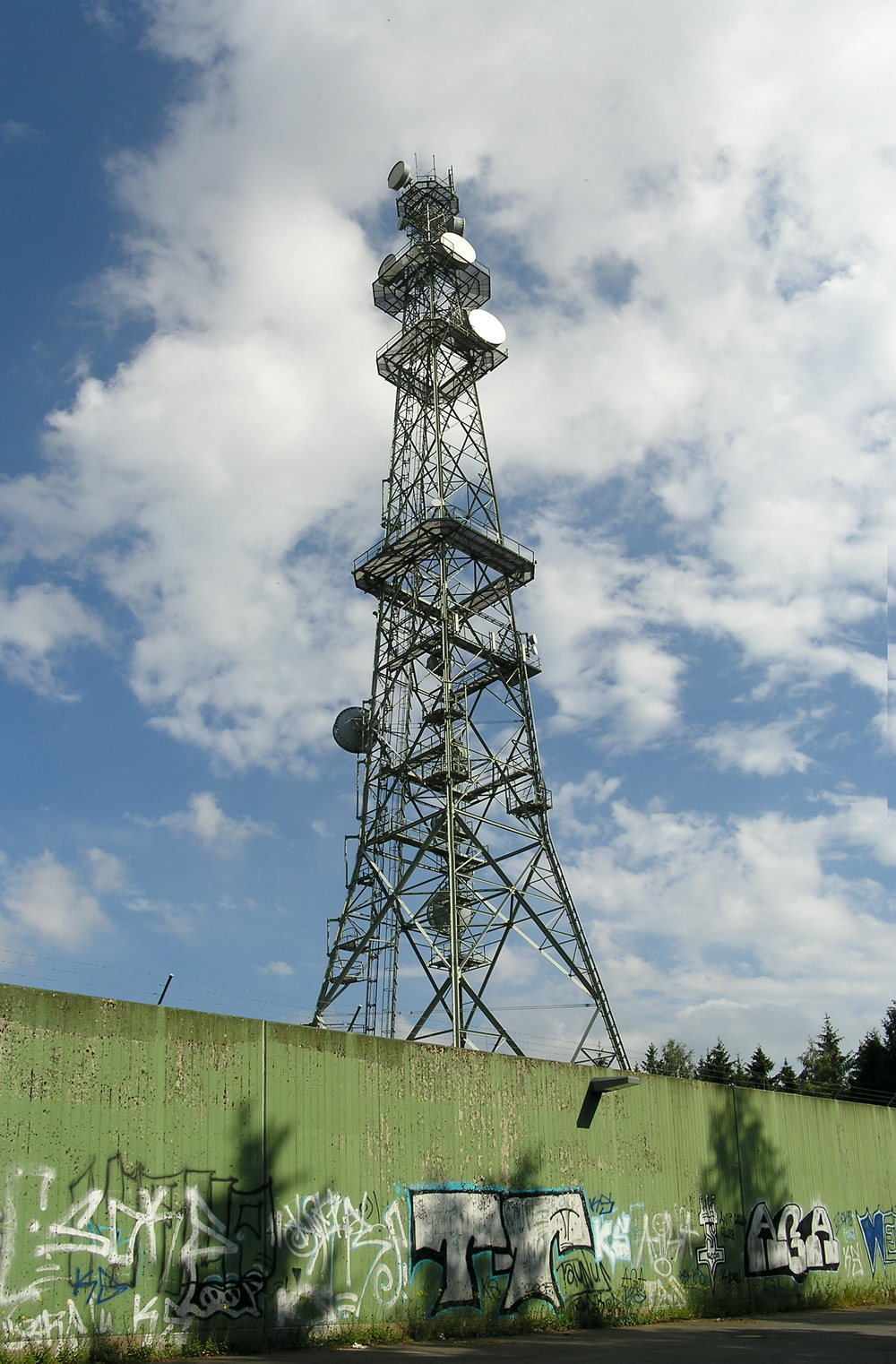
- Kolbenberg Mountain

Highest point
- Elevation: 684 m (2,244 ft)

Geography
- Location: Hesse, Germany

Kolbenberg is a mountain of Hesse, Germany.
