= Schläferskopf =

Hill in Hesse, Germany

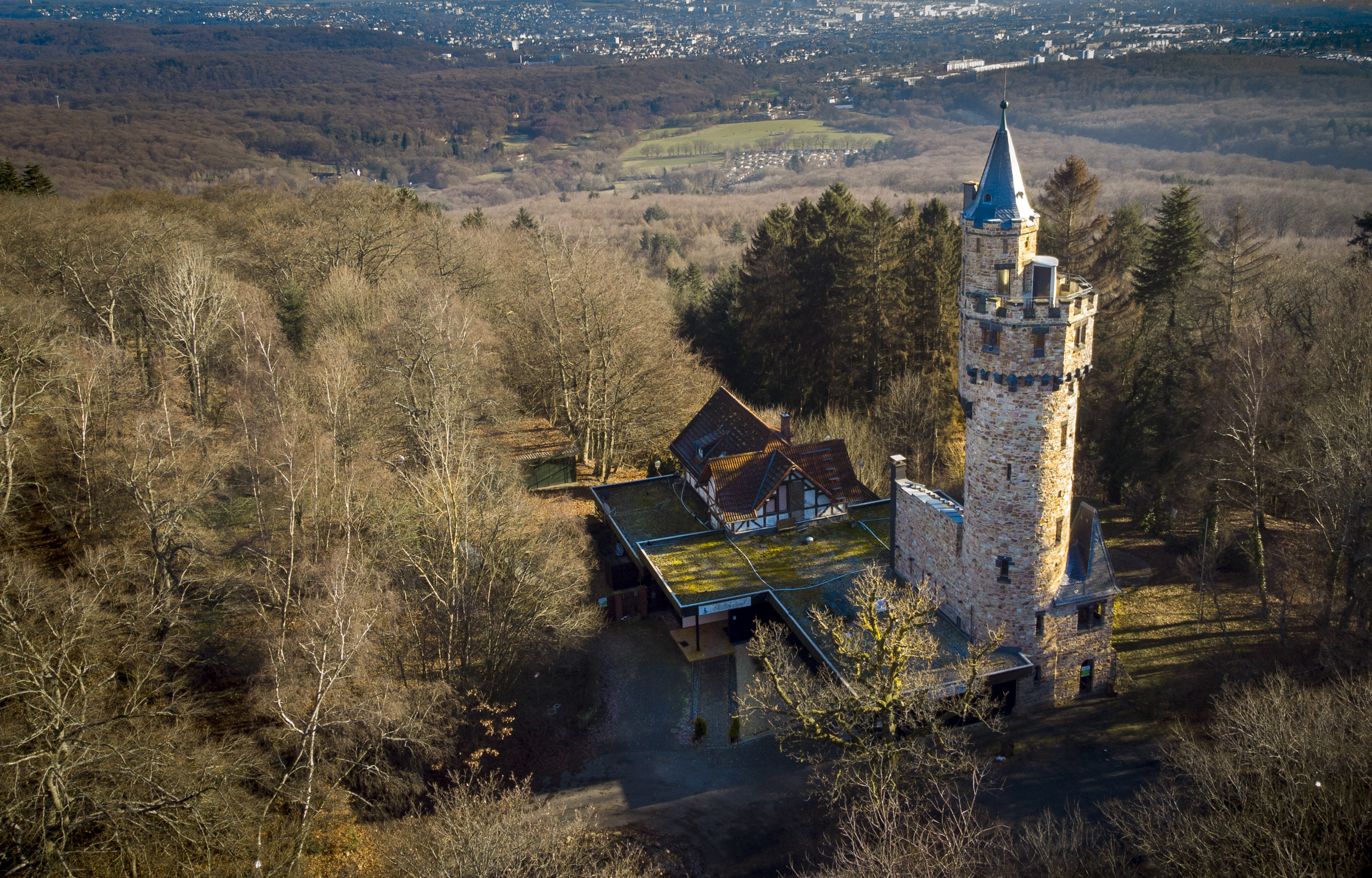
- Aerial view of Schläferskopf

Highest point
- Elevation: 454.2 m above sea level (NHN) (1,490 ft)
- Coordinates: 50°06′29″N 8°10′01″E

Geography
- Location within Hesse
- Location: Near Klarenthal; Wiesbaden, Hesse (Germany)
- Features: Schläferskopfstollen, Kaiser Wilhelm Tower (viewing tower) and wildlife park
- Parent range: Taunus

The Schläferskopf is a hill in Hesse, Germany, which is 454 metres high.

== Kaiser Wilhelm Tower ==
In 1883, a 10-metre-high, wooden viewing tower was built on the summit of the Schläferskopf; it fell into disrepair and was demolished in 1900. In 1905, on the initiative of the Wiesbaden Conservation Society, work on a 31-metre-high tower was begun and, in July 1906, the new Kaiser Wilhelm Turm (formerly also the Kaiser Wilhelm II.-Turm) was opened. It was made from local rubble stone and basalt lava with a room for "refuge and refreshing". Typical of the period it was designed to resemble a medieval fighting tower or bergfried. The watchtower turret on the polygonal platform reinforces the impression. One unusual feature is the double spiral staircase which enables a separation between "up" and "down" stairs.

In the restaurant building added in 1907/08 is a room with a notable jugendstil window. It comes from Wiesbaden glassworker, Albert Zentner, who also made the windows in the churches of Medenbach and Otzberg. The Kaiser Wilhelm Room is graced by an oil painting, which shows the Kaiser in a hunting scene.

On 16 September 2014 the municipal authorities of Wiesbaden decided to carry out a comprehensive refurbishment of the Kaiser Wilhelm Tower in 2015 at a cost of 700,000 euros. 52,000 euros of the cost was met by the two mobile phone operators that have transmission equipment on the tower. This refurbishment was completed in May 2016. Since September 2016 the tower has been open at weekends and on public holidays and may also be opened by individual appointment.

From the viewing platform of the tower there are views over the Taunus and, southwards, towards the Upper Rhine Plain and Wiesbaden.

Attached to the tower is a mountain inn formerly called the Waldcafé Schläferskopf and now the Waldrestaurant Schläferskopf Gold. Access to the tower is normally through the restaurant, but it's currently closed. The city of Wiesbaden is looking for a new leaseholder. At the moment the tower can only be ascend for rare special opening times.

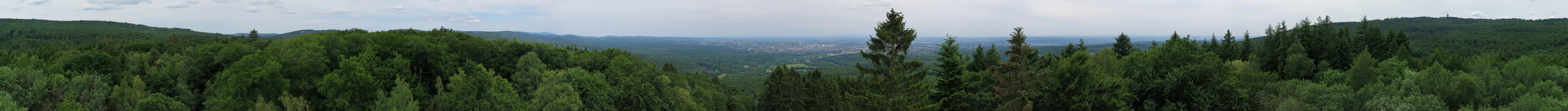
Panoramic view (360°) from the Kaiser Wilhelm Tower
