= Glashütten (Taunus) =

- Municipality
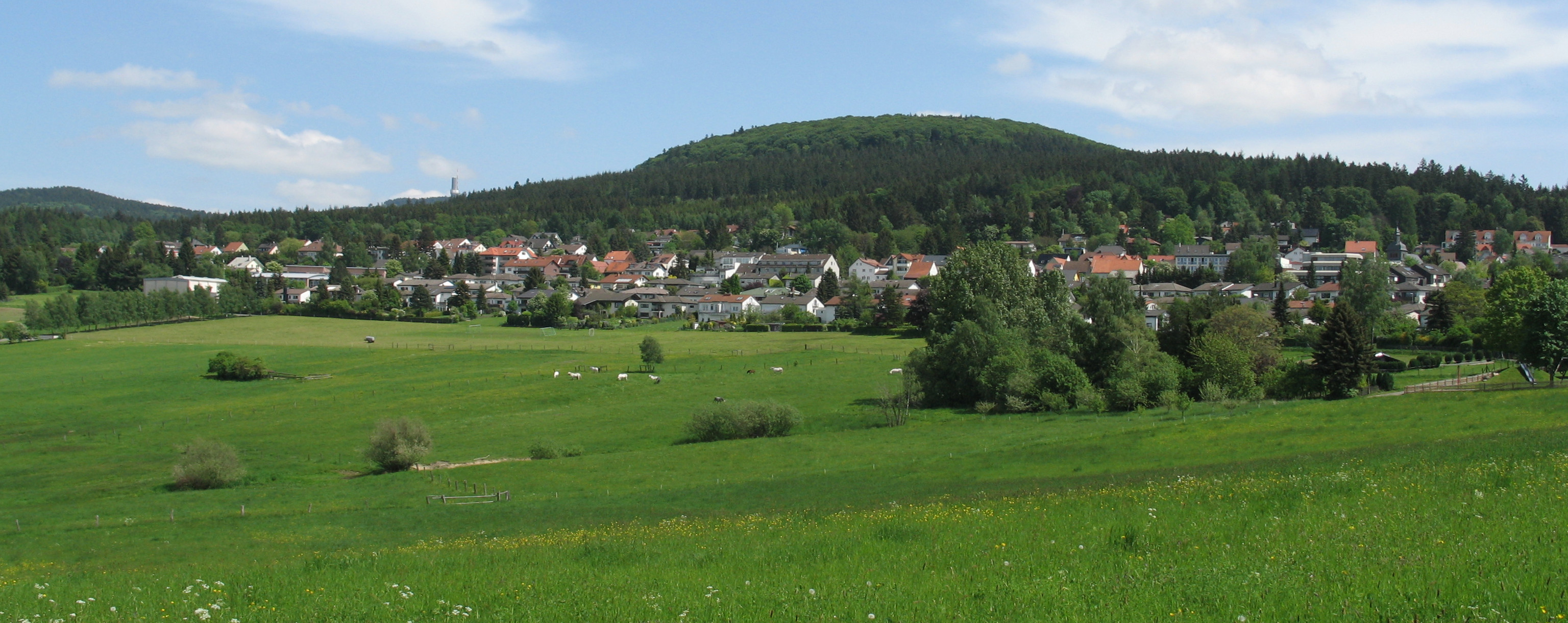
- Glashütten

- Coat of arms

- Location of Glashütten within Hochtaunuskreis district
- Interactive map of Glashütten
- Location within Germany Location within Hesse
- Coordinates: 50°13′N 8°24′E
- Country: Germany
- State: Hesse
- Admin. region: Darmstadt
- District: Hochtaunuskreis
- Subdivisions: 3 Ortsteile: Glashütten, Schloßborn, Oberems

Government
  - Mayor (2021–27): Thomas Ciesielski (CDU)

Area
  - Total: 27.11 km^{2} (10.47 sq mi)
- Elevation: 350–826 m (1,148–2,710 ft)

Population (2025-12-31)
  - Total: 5,328
  - Density: 196.5/km^{2} (509.0/sq mi)
- Time zone: UTC+01:00 (CET)
  - Summer (DST): UTC+02:00 (CEST)
- Postal codes: 61479
- Dialling codes: 06174 (Glashütten and Schloßborn), 06082 (Oberems)
- Vehicle registration: HG, USI
- Website: www.gemeinde-glashuetten.de

Glashütten is a small municipality in the Hochtaunuskreis. This community in the Taunus, which is made up of the three formerly independent communities of Glashütten, Schloßborn and Oberems, lies in the Hochtaunus Nature Park, not far from Königstein im Taunus, Germany.

== Geography ==
=== Neighbouring communities ===
Glashütten borders in the north on the communities of Waldems (Rheingau-Taunus-Kreis) and Schmitten, in the east on the town of Königstein, in the south on the towns of Kelkheim and Eppstein, and in the west on the town of Idstein (Rheingau-Taunus-Kreis).

=== Constituent communities ===
Glashütten consists of the three centres of Glashütten, Oberems and Schloßborn.

== Schloßborn ==
This is arguably the first verifiable settlement in the Idstein Basin, in the area before the Goldener Grund ("Golden Ground"), in the combe in the row of Taunus peaks among Glaskopf (685 m), the Großer Lindenkopf (499 m) and the Hohe Kanzel (595 m).

In terms of road geography it lies in the middle between the Kölnische Straße ("Cologne Road"), now known as the B 8 (Frankfurt - Königstein - Esch - Limburg - Cologne), and the valley road in the basin (Hofheim - Eppstein - Esch).

It is surrounded by low peaks: the Butznickel (462 m), the Rotherberg (446 m), the Maisel (482 m), the Eichkopf (563 m) and the Atzelberg (507 m). Schloßborn's relative wealth of water is due mainly to its location among the headwaters of the Silberbach, the Weiherbach and the Dattenbach.

=== Statistics ===
- Elevation: 400 m
- Population: 3000
