= Georgenborn =

German village

Coordinates: 50°05′N 8°07′E

Georgenborn is a village of 2000 inhabitants in the municipality of Schlangenbad, Germany. The village is located in the Taunus mountains between Schlangenbad and Wiesbaden and was founded in 1694 by Fürst Georg of Nassau-Idstein.

An annual event is held on March 25 in which citizens help clean the cemetery and surrounding areas. The municipality also helps by providing equipment to the citizens.
