= Glaskopf =

Mountain in Hesse, Germany

Coordinates: 50°13′05″N 08°25′02″E

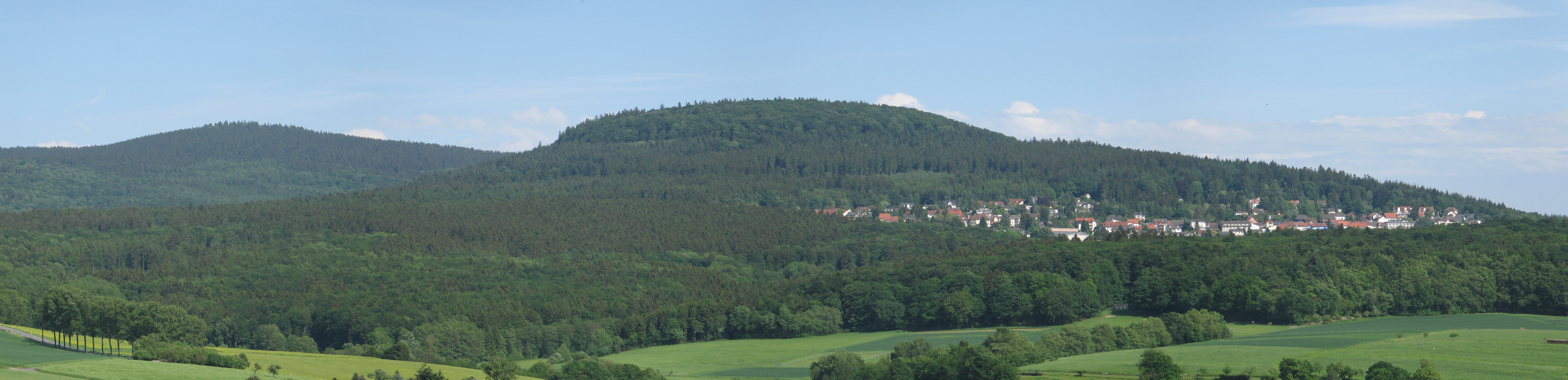
- View of The mountain "Glaskopf", Taunus, Germany.

Highest point
- Elevation: 687 m (2,254 ft)

Geography
- Location: Hesse, Germany

Glaskopf is a mountain of Hesse, Germany.
