= Atzelberg =

Mountain in Hesse, Germany

Coordinates: 50°10′31″N 8°23′17″E

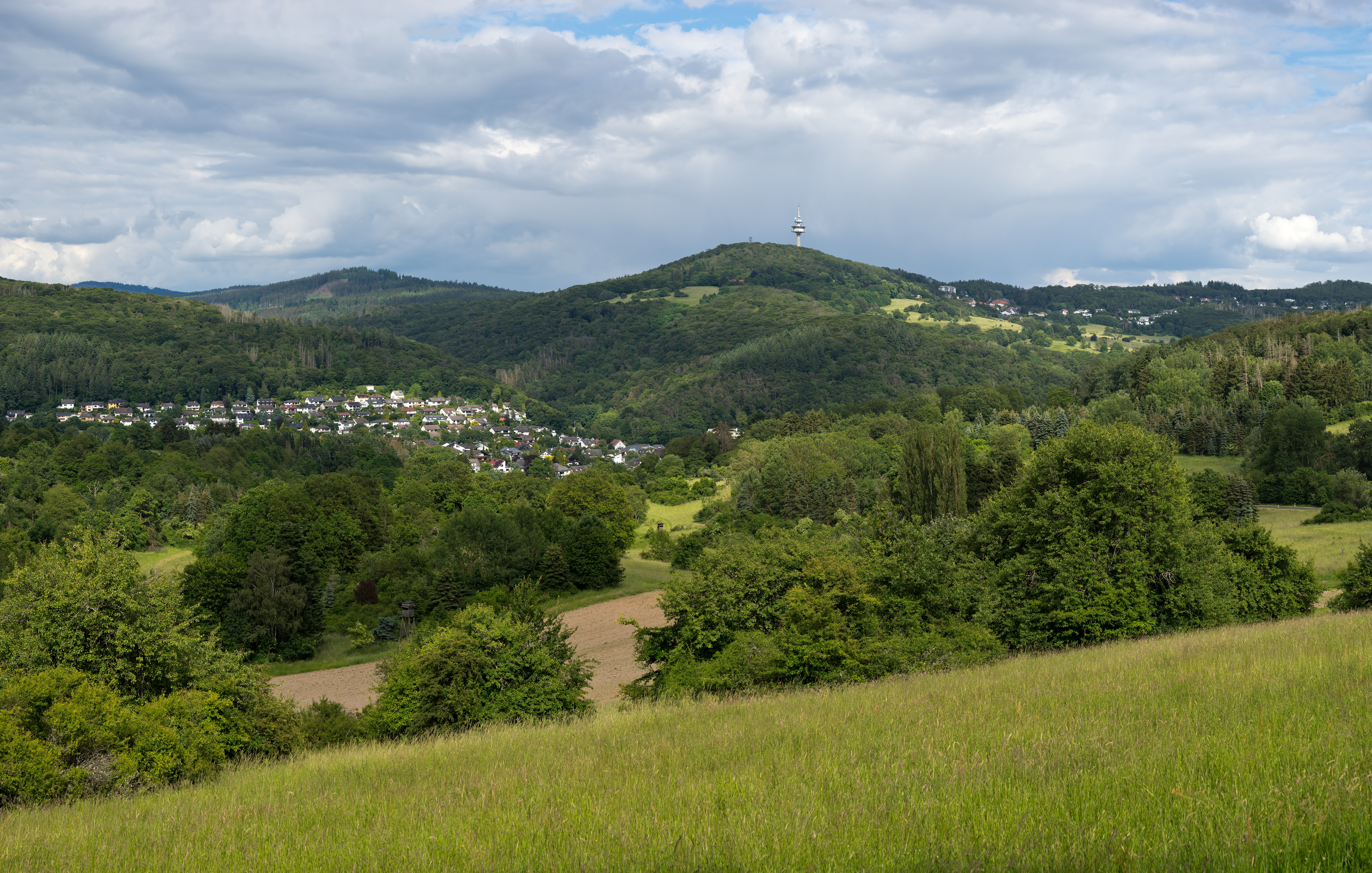
- Atzelberg seen from the west

Highest point
- Elevation: 507 m (1,663 ft)

Geography
- Location: Hesse, Germany

The Atzelberg is a mountain of the Taunus near Eppenhain, constituent community of Kelkheim, Hesse, Germany. Its silhouette is remarkable for a Typenturm radio tower. It is part of the natural region High Taunus although being part of the Main-Taunus-Kreis as well.

== Tower ==
The summit of the Atzelberg is topped by the Luisenturm, a steel observation tower constructed as a replacement for an earlier timber structure. The current tower reaches a height of 27 metres and is built from steel tubular elements forming a three-dimensional steel truss. Its design follows classical observation tower concepts and is executed using a modern, fully welded steel tubular construction in off-knot configuration, in which the joining points are located between, rather than at, the structural nodes.
