= Altkönig =

Mountain in Hesse, Germany

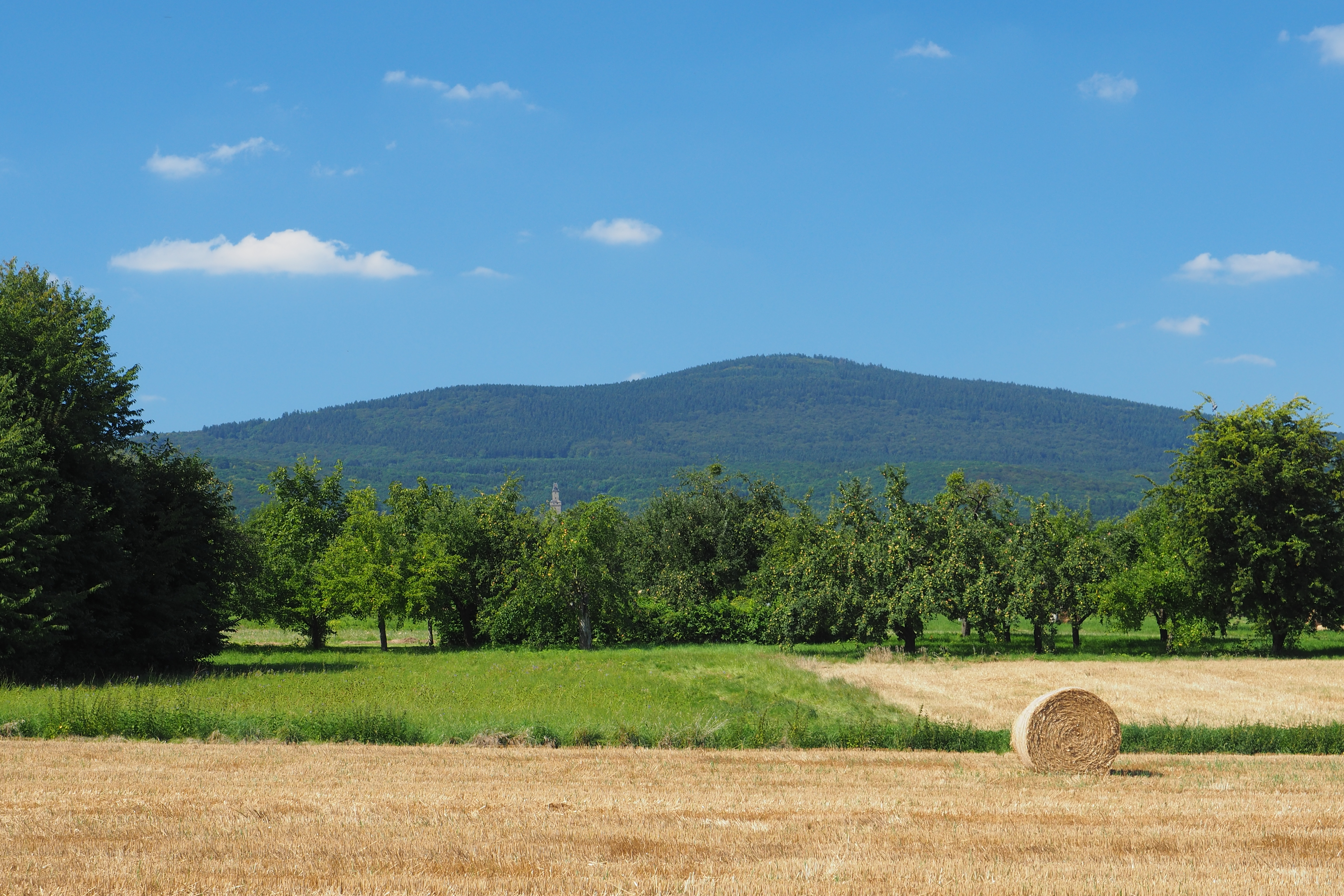
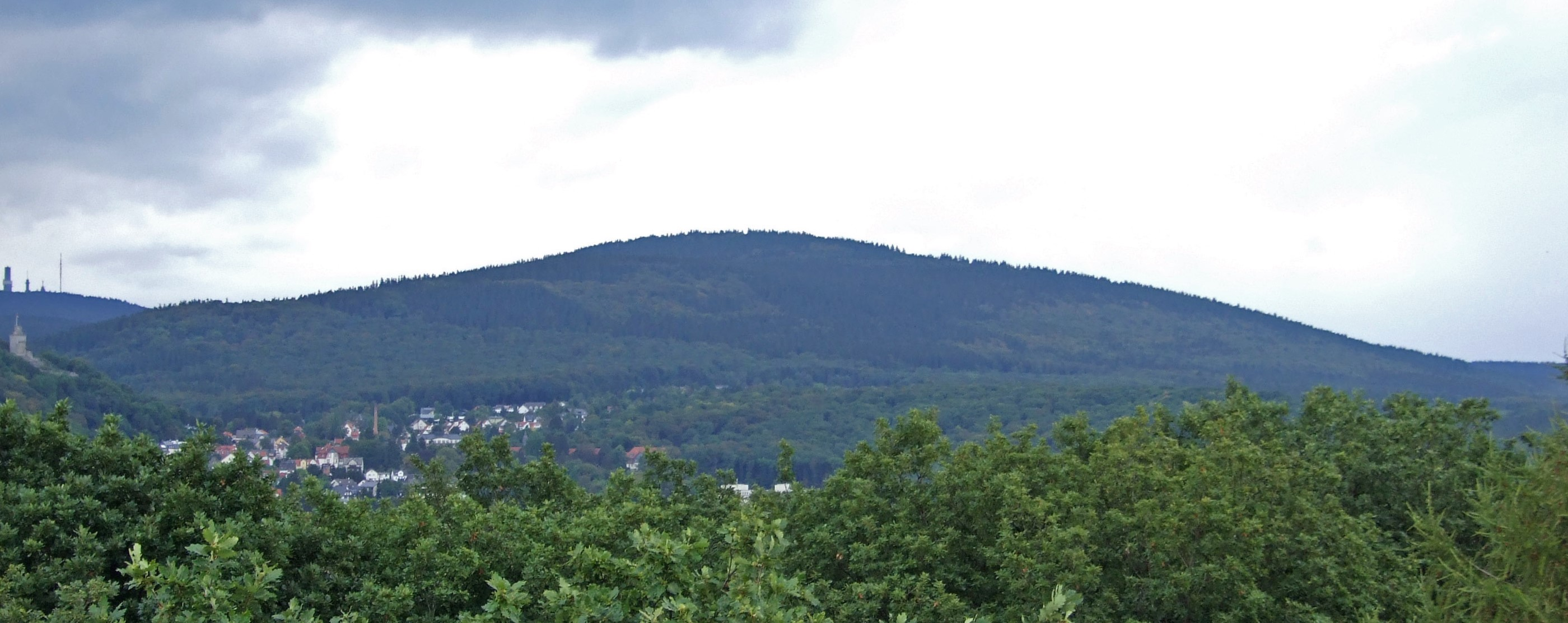
- View of the Altkönig looking north-northwest from a field track by the Schwalbach tributary, the Grumbach, near Limesstadt View of the Altkönig from the south-southeast with the village of Falkenstein, the ruins of Falkenstein Castle and, behind, the Großer Feldberg

Highest point
- Elevation: 798.2 m above sea level (NHN) (2,619 ft)
- Prominence: 136 m ↓ Fuchstanz
- Isolation: 2.45 km → Großer Feldberg
- Listing: – Altkönig hillfort – Lips Temple – Viktoria Temple – Weiße Mauer – Hünerberg hillfort
- Coordinates: 50°12′44.8″N 8°28′53.6″E

Geography
- Location within Hesse
- Location: near Falkenstein; county of Hochtaunuskreis, Hesse, Germany
- Parent range: Taunus

The Altkönig is the third highest mountain of the Taunus range in Hesse, Germany, reaching a height of 798.2 m above sea level (NHN).

Its summit is lies within the borough of Kronberg im Taunus not far from the village of Königstein im Taunus which is part of Falkenstein in the Hessian county of Hochtaunuskreis.

With an isolation of 2,450 metres and a prominence of over 136 metres above saddle at the Fuchstanz (662 m) leading to the Kleiner Feldberg (825.2 m), the Altkönig is one of the most striking peaks in the Taunus. Together with the Großer Feldberg (881.5 m) and Kleiner Feldberg it forms the crown of the High Taunus (Feldberg-Taunus ridge); unlike the Feldberg, however, it does not lie on the main ridge itself but rises to the south and parallel with it.

On the Altkönig are the Altkönig Circular Rampart and on its spurs the Lips and Victoria Temples, the White Wall and the Hünerberg Circular Rampart. In the local region are Altkönig School in Kronberg, the local Altkönig Foundation and Altkönig Hall in Steinbach as well as many roads that are named after the mountain.

== Name ==
Various names for the mountain are documented. In 1496 it was referred to as ald kune, 1511 as alten kune, 1586 as altkünn and alt kin, and in 1780 as Altkün and Altküng. Helmut Bode derives the name from the Celtic alkin ("height"). Erasmus Alberus used the term Altköng in his poem in 1534 and called it the seat of the German king. Since 2004 in Oberursel there has been a sculpture, the Der Altkönig by Inga Dilcher-Hassenstein (born 1908 in Usingen), in the former Camp King. The sculpture portrays stylistically a legendary old king.

== Geography ==
=== Location ===
The Altkönig rises in the Taunus Nature Park and belongs to the borough of Kronberg im Taunus. Its summit is about 2.3 km north of Falkenstein, a northeastern district of Königstein im Taunus, and 7 km west-northwest of the main town of Oberursel. On the northeast spur(634 m) of the wooded mountain lies the White Wall, its southeast spur is called Hünerberg (375 m), the south-south-east spur is the Bürgel (446.4 m) and the south spur is the Döngesberg (689 m).

=== Natural regions ===
The Altkönig belongs to the major unit group of the Taunus (No. 30), the major unit of the High Taunus (301) and the subunit of the Feldberg-Taunus Crest (301.3). Its terrain falls to the south and southeast into the natural areas of the Königsteiner Taunusfuß (300.20) and Kronberger Taunusfuß (300.21), which are part of major unit of the Anterior Taunus (Vortaunus) (300) and sub-unit Altkönig Vorstufe (300.2).

=== Watercourses ===
The Maßborn (Massborn) rises on the lower part of the mountain's northern flank and then flows east of the mountain. It is one of several source brooks of the Urselbach that flows north past the Altkönig. The Treisbornbach rises on the western flank and is a tributary of the Reichenbach, which runs southwards.

== Protected areas ==
On the Altkönig lies the Altkönig nature reserve (CDDA - No. 81275; designated 1944; 2.0555 km^{2}) and on its summit region the Altkönig Fauna-Flora Habitat (FFH no. 5716 -305; 75.11 ha).

== Hill forts and temples ==
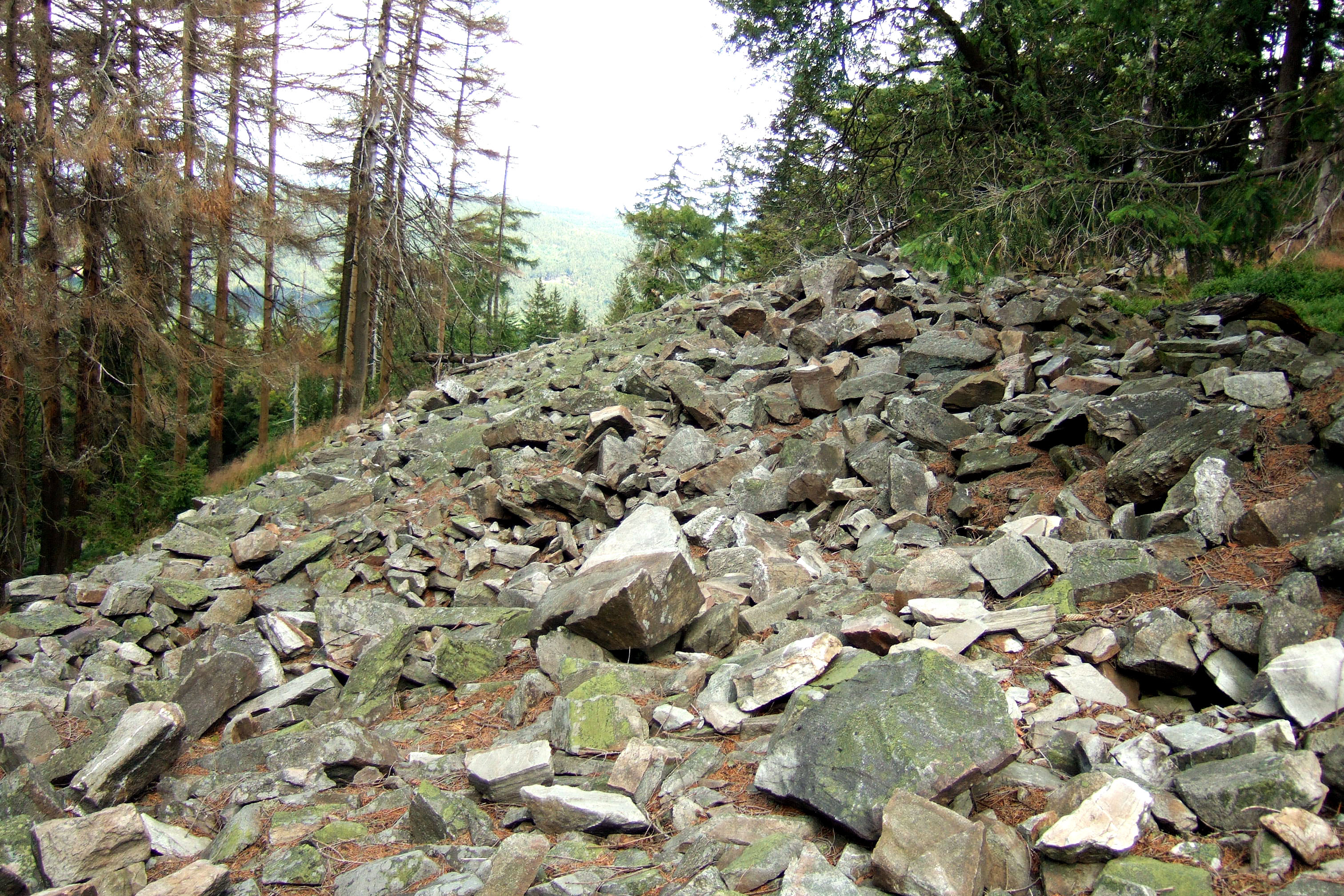
Altkönig hill fort (Ringwall): inner bank

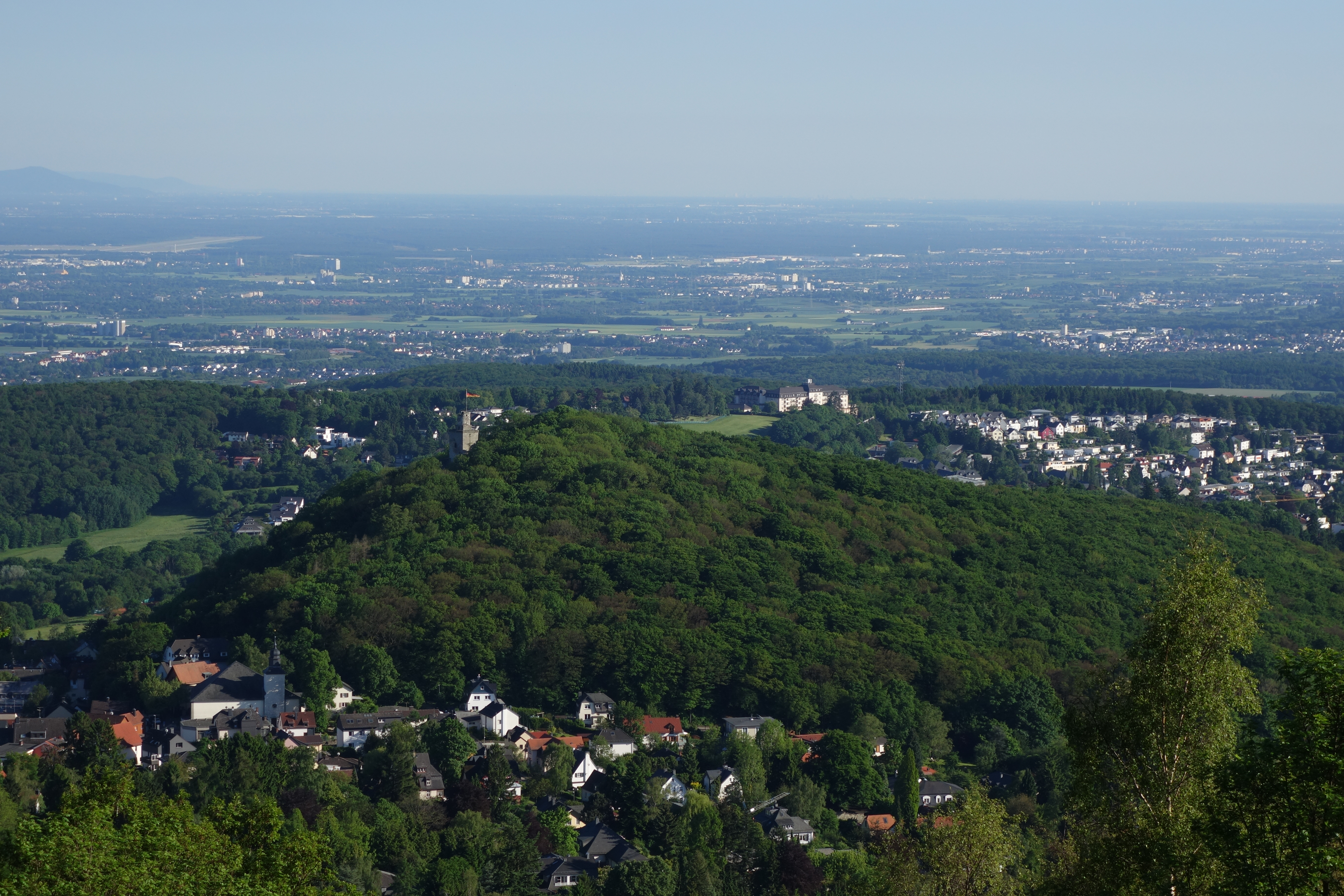
View from the Lips Temple of Burghain and ruins of Falkenstein Castle. At the rear left on the horizon is the Melibokus in the Odenwald, in front of it is Runway 18 West.

=== Altkönig Hillfort ===
In the La Tène period, around 400 BC, Celts settled on the Altkönig. The two circular ramparts (Ringwälle) and subsidiary embankments (Annexwälle) of the Altkönig Hillfort on the summit plateau date from that time. They are around 980 m and 1390 m long and still visible today. So far, there is no reliable information about the time and reason for abandoning the mountain settlement. Around 1900 the summit plateau was still free of trees, because contemporary sources report that with good visibility the white circular ramparts on the Altkönig could be seen with the naked eye from 18 km southeast of Frankfurt.

=== Hünerberg Hillfort ===
In addition, on the Altkönig spur of Hünerberg lies the Hünerberg Hillfort, probably an early mediaeval Frankish settlement.

=== Viewing points ===
On the southwest spur of the Altkönig spur of Döngesberg stands the refuge hut of Lips Temple (Lips-Tempel, 606.2 m) from where there are views of the Altkönig, the village of Falkenstein and the Upper Rhine Plain, the ruins of Falkenstein Castle and the Großer Feldberg. On the southern slope of the Bürgel spur is the viewpoint of Victoria Temple (Viktoriatempel) with a view of the Upper Rhine Plain and the Odenwald Forest.

== Summit plateau ==
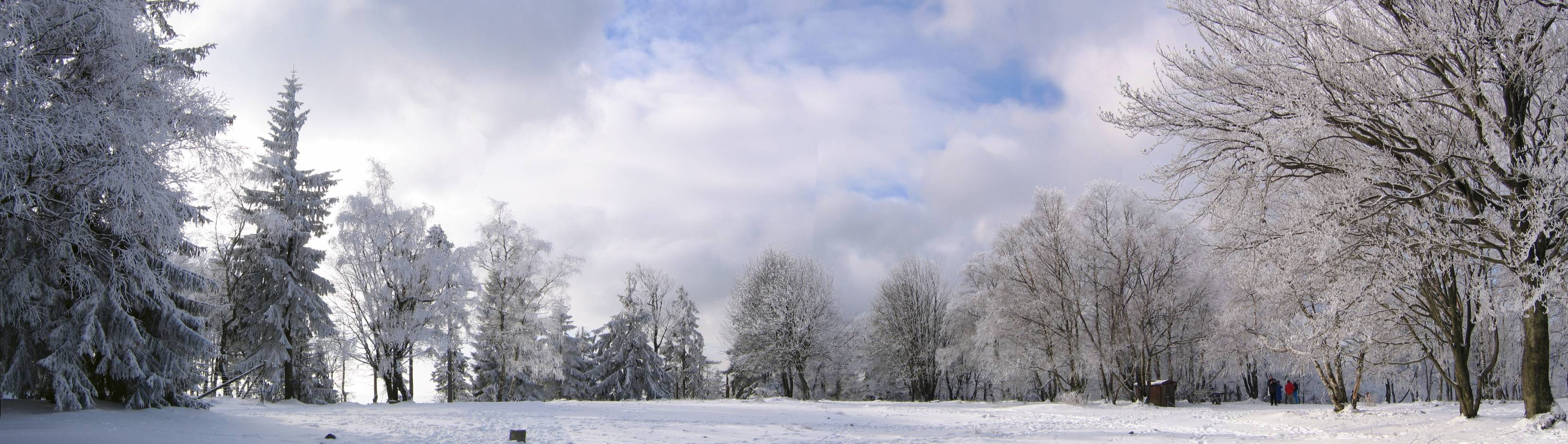
Altkönig: summit plateau in winter

There is a trig point on the lightly wooded summit plateau of the Altkönig. In good visibility, there are views between the trees of the Upper Rhine Plain and Frankfurt. Furthermore, tables and benches are provided for visitors. A small wooden shelter built in 2014 was dismantled in 2015 due to a lack of building and nature conservation authority.

== Plane crash ==
In the plane crash on the Altkönig on 22 January 1971, six people were killed. They had previously been visiting the construction site of a tramway in Frankfurt. The light plane crashed about 150 metres below and about 820 metres south-southeast of the mountain summit. There is a memorial stone at the crash site on the 300-metre path to the east of the Döngesberg.

== Access and hiking ==
There are no roads leading to the Altkönig, thus it is much less frequented than the Großer Feldberg.

There are hiking trails to the summit from all directions, the shortest distance to a main road, the Landesstraße 3004 (Schmitten - Sandplacken - Oberursel), being about 1.5 km as the crow flies. About the same distance away is the residential district of Falkenstein to the south.

The E1 European long distance path runs over the mountain. To the west, not far on its flank, is the mountain pass of Fuchstanz with its two restaurants for day trippers.

== Gallery ==
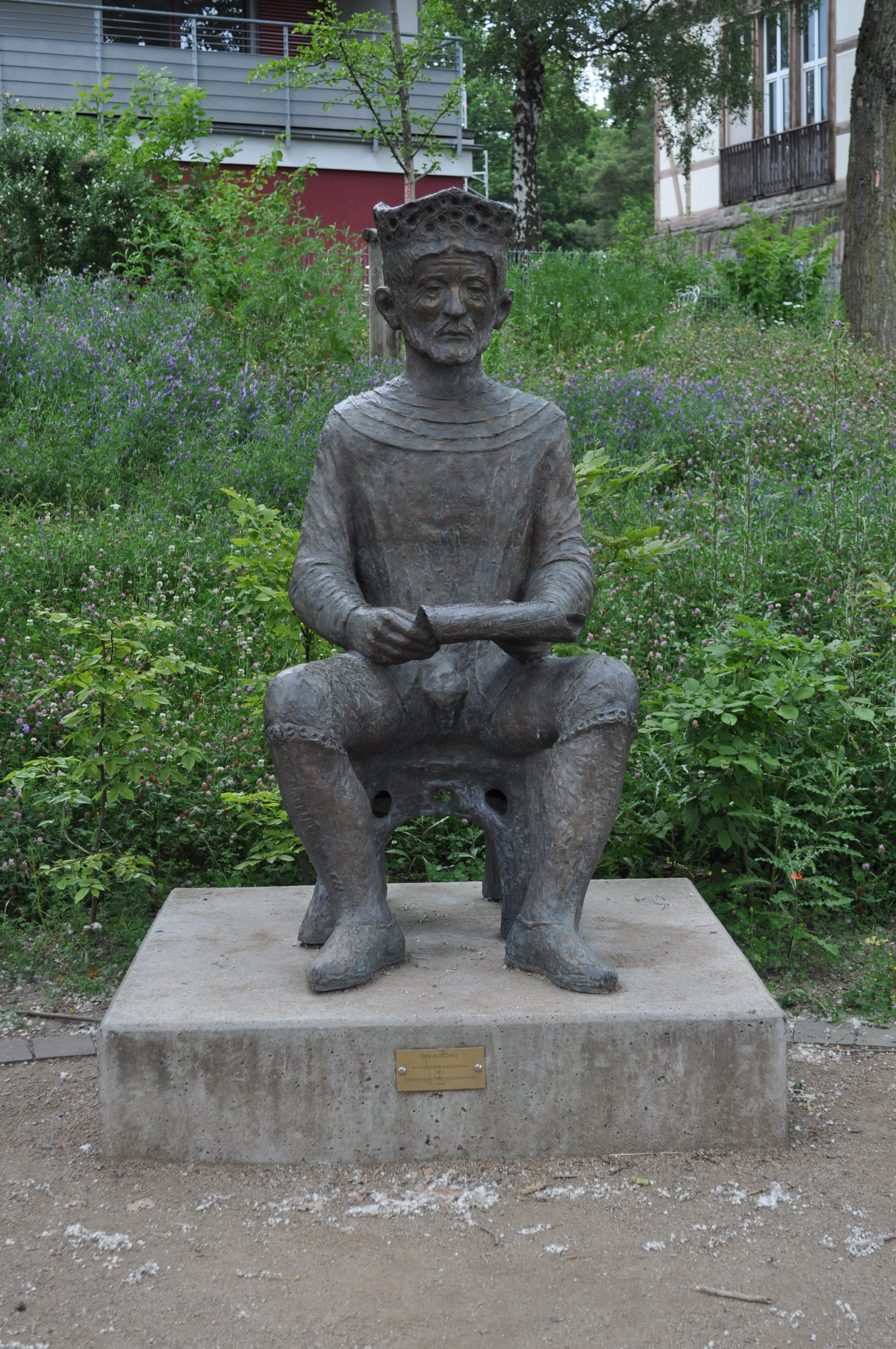
Sculpture Der Altkönig in Oberursel (50°13′7″N 8°33′13.1″E)

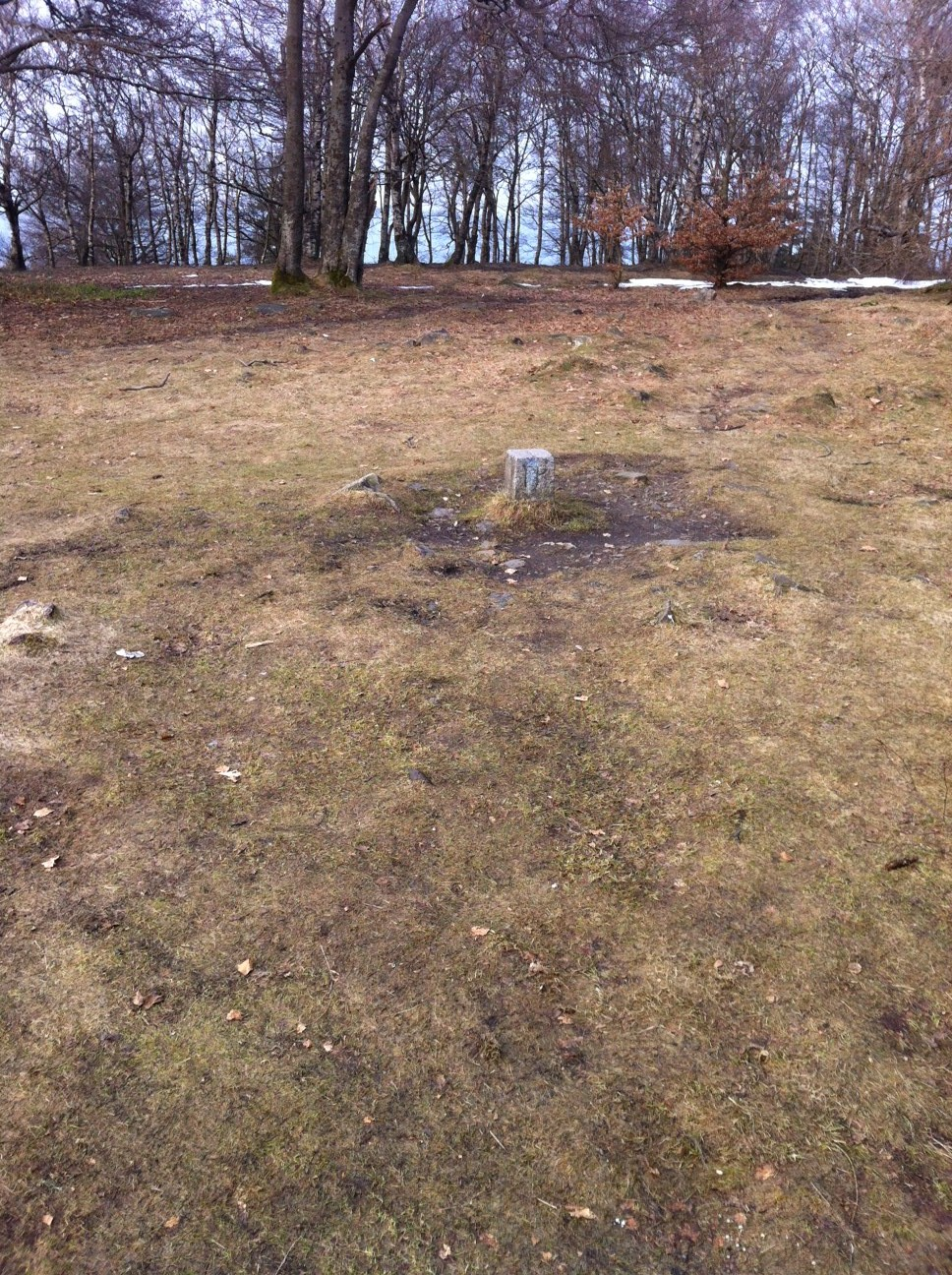
Trig point on the summit plateau

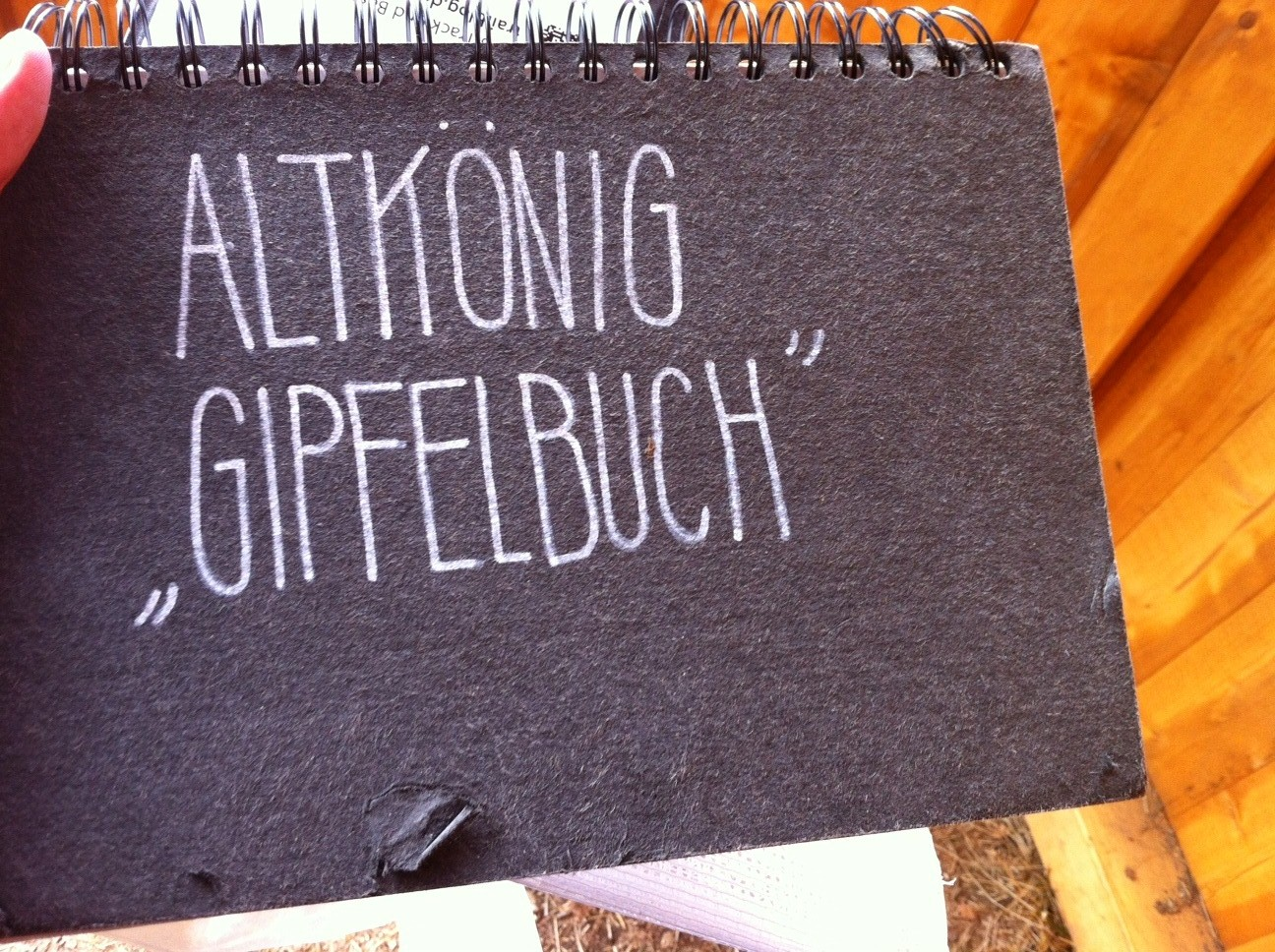
Altkönig: summit book

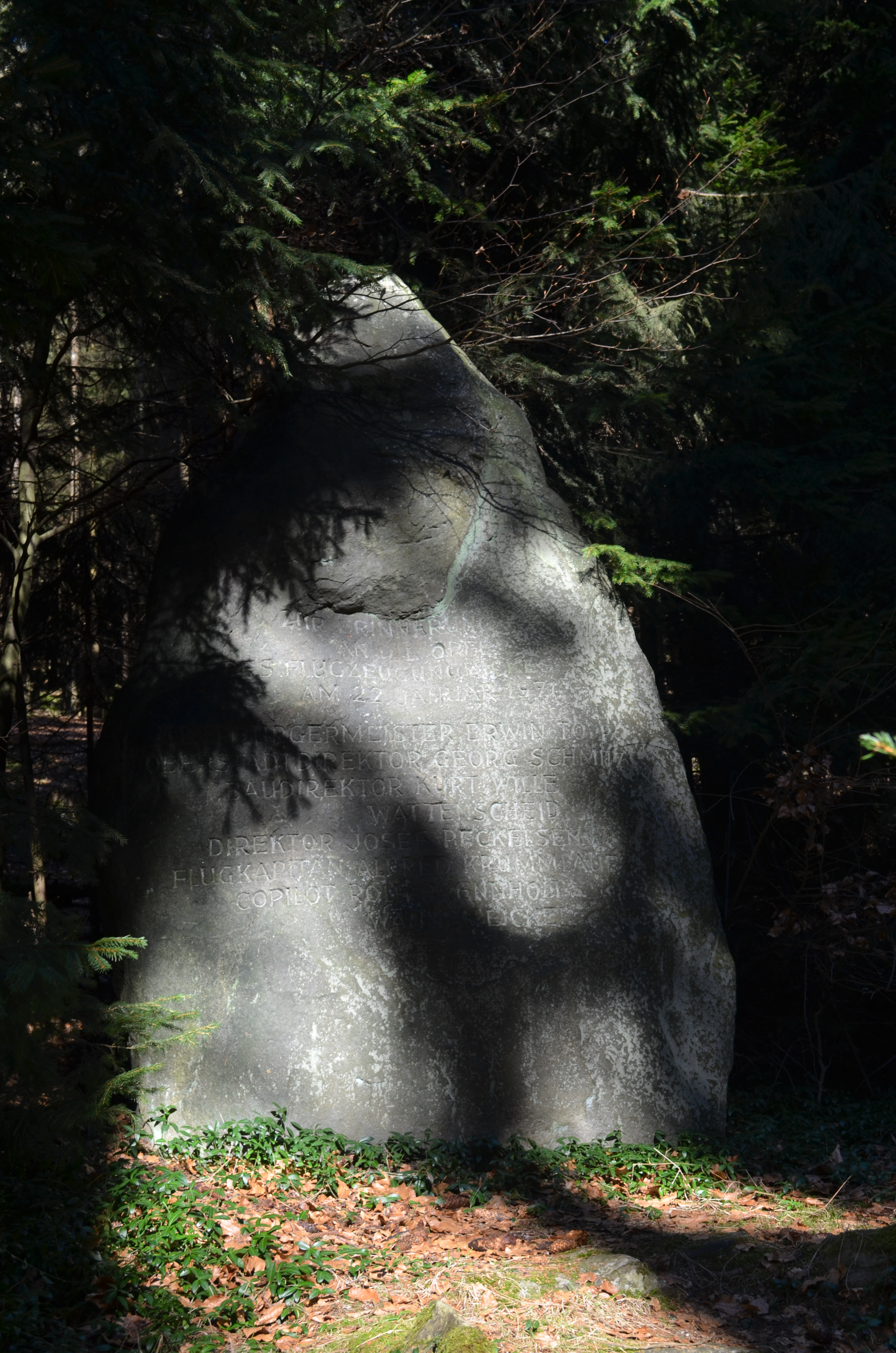
Memorial stone for the air accident

== See also ==
- List of mountains and hills of the Taunus
