= White Wall =

White wall may refer to:

- White Wall (Company), a Germany based company, producing high-quality photo products and photo prints
- White Wall (TV drama), a Finnish-Swedish television drama, mystery and sci-fi series* White Wall (Taunus), a prominent rock formation in Hesse
- White wall tyre, a fashion in care tyres
- The White Wall, a Swedish drama film
- White wall (architecture), an aspect of solar architecture
