= White Wall (Taunus) =

Natural quartzite field in Germany

Coordinates: 50°13′18″N 8°29′50″E

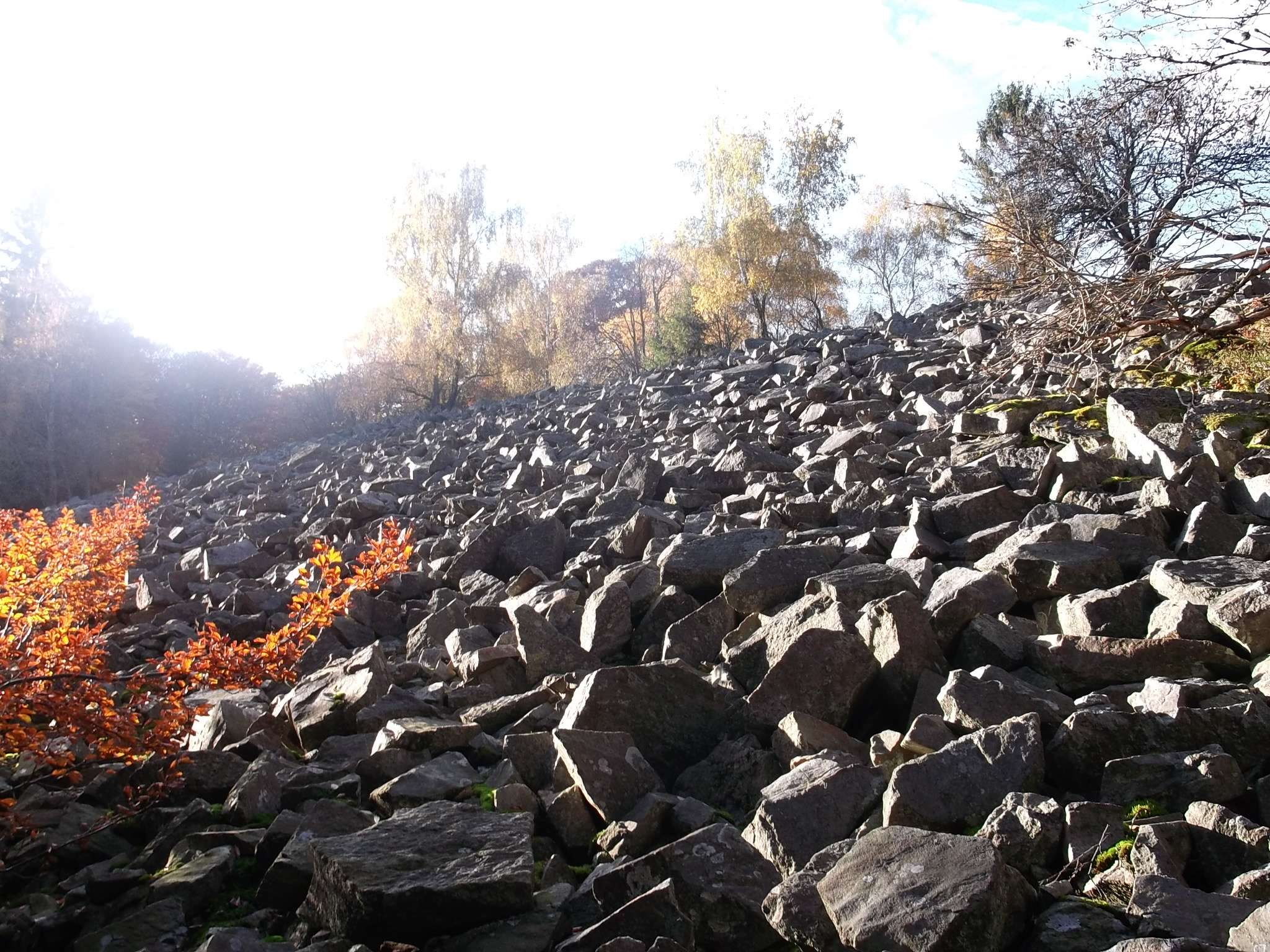
White Wall: quartzite blockfield

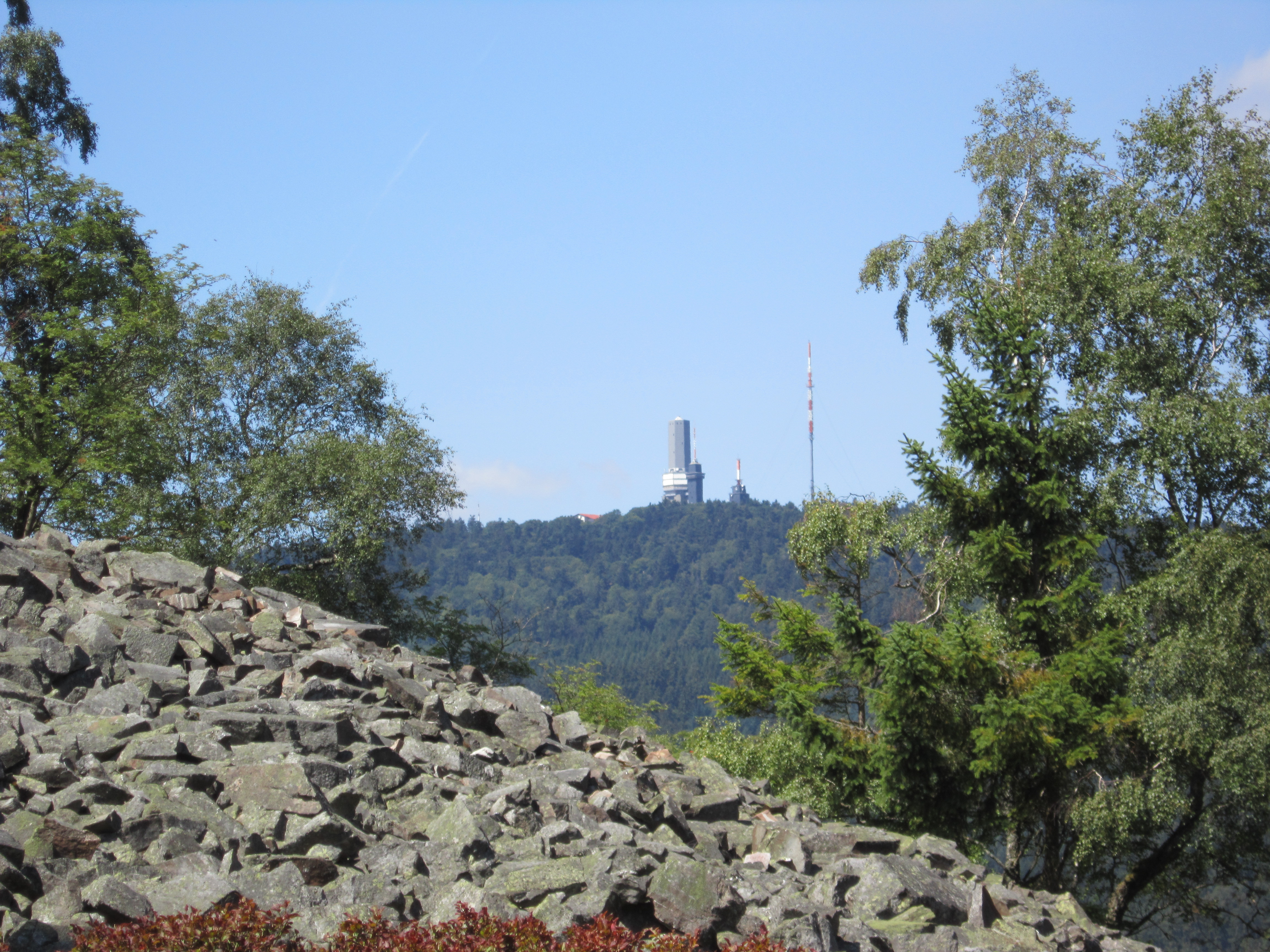
View from the White Wall northwest towards the Großer Feldberg

The White Wall (German: Weiße Mauer) in the Taunus is a quartzite field on the Altkönig that was formed in the ice age as a result of frost weathering. It lies at a maximum elevation of 634 m above sea level (NHN) near Oberursel in the Hessian county of Hochtaunuskreis in Germany.

From the pass on the Kanonenstraße, which runs from Oberursel up to the Großer Feldberg, the rocky terrain looks like a stone quarry. In sunlight the rocks gleam white; hence the name of the debris field.

== Geography ==
=== Location ===
The White Wall lies within the Taunus Nature Park on the northeastern slopes of the Altkönig (798.2 m), whose summit is about 1.4 km away, and 6 km northwest of the centre of Oberursel. It is in the Altkönig nature reserve in the former municipal forest of Harheim. It is surrounded by knobby birches and heathland.

=== Natural regions ===
The White Wall belongs to the natural region major unit group of the Taunus (No. 30), the major unit of the High Taunus (301) and the subunit of Feldberg-Taunuskamm (301.3). Its terrain descends towards the southeast into the natural region of Kronberger Taunusfuß (300.21), which is within the major unit of the Anterior Taunus (300) and subunit of Altkönig Vorstufe (300.2).

== Geology ==
The blockfield belongs to the Taunus Quartzite and is thus made of similar material to the Altkönig hillfort and other local rock formations (the Marmorstein, Elisabethenstein and Goldgrube).

== Hiking ==
The E1 European long distance path runs over the southern uplands of the White Wall from the pass of Fuchstanz (662 m) to the west and then over the Altkönig to the southwest. The route leaves the paved track in places and, after the quartzite field, heads east down to the Hohe Mark in the valley of the Urselbach.

== See also ==
- List of mountains and hills of the Taunus

== Literature ==
- Hermin Herr: Lexikon vom hohen Taunus, 1993, ISBN 3-7829-0437-0, p. 121
