= Königstein im Taunus =

- Town
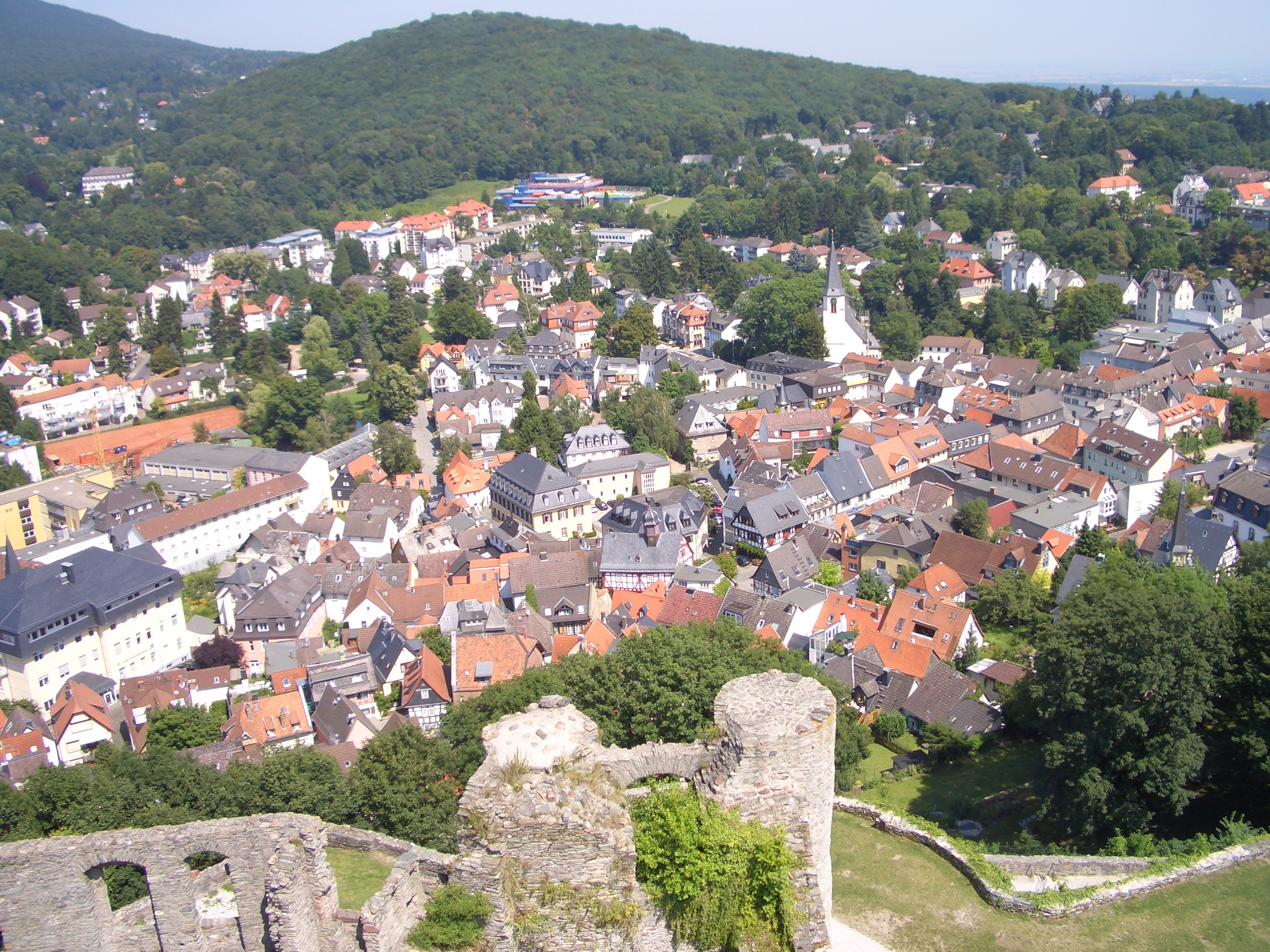
- View from Königstein castle ruins over the town

- Coat of arms

- Location of Königstein im Taunus within Hochtaunuskreis district
- Interactive map of Königstein im Taunus
- Location within Germany Location within Hesse
- Coordinates: 50°11′N 8°28′E
- Country: Germany
- State: Hesse
- District: Hochtaunuskreis

Government
  - Mayor (2024–30): Jakob Dienst (CDU)

Area
  - Total: 25.05 km^{2} (9.67 sq mi)
- Elevation: 200–410 m (660–1,350 ft)

Population (2025-12-31)
  - Total: 16,600
  - Density: 663/km^{2} (1,720/sq mi)
- Time zone: UTC+01:00 (CET)
  - Summer (DST): UTC+02:00 (CEST)
- Postal codes: 61462
- Dialling codes: 06174, 06173 Mammolshain
- Vehicle registration: HG, USI
- Website: www.koenigstein.de

Königstein im Taunus (German pronunciation: [ˈkøːnɪçʃtaɪn ʔɪm ˈtaʊnʊs], lit. 'Königstein in the Taunus') is a spa town that lies on the thickly wooded slopes of the Taunus in Hesse, Germany. The town is part of the Frankfurt Rhein-Main urban area and belongs to the Hochtaunuskreis district. Neighbouring places are Kronberg im Taunus, Glashütten, Schwalbach am Taunus, Bad Soden am Taunus and Kelkheim.

== Geography ==
Königstein is neighbouring the municipalities of Glashütten, Schmitten, Oberursel, and Kronberg inside the Hochtaunuskreis district. From the south-west to the south-east it borders the municipalities of Schwalbach, Bad Soden and Kelkheim in the Main-Taunus-Kreis district.

Königstein consists of four parts, the city centre, Falkenstein, Mammolshain and Schneidhain. Since 2001, Falkenstein has borne the designation Heilklimatischer Kurort (spa town) independently of the complete town's status as such.

== History ==
The town's founding date is unknown. The name 'Königstein' means 'King stone'. Local legend states that King Chlodwig (466–511) founded the town after building a castle on a hill, as well as a chapel.

Königstein was first mentioned in a document in 1215, making it likelier that the castle was built around the 12th century for the town's – and the Frankfurt-Cologne commercial road's – security.

Also in that time came the town's first lords, the Counts of Nürings, but they were supplanted in 1239 by the Lords of Hagen-Münzenberg into whose ownership the castle went as an Imperial fief. The Lords of Hagen-Münzenberg were in turn followed by the Lords of Bolanden-Falkenstein from 1255 to 1418, under whose rule Königstein was granted town rights in 1313. The Lords of Bolanden-Falkenstein were succeeded by the Lords of Eppstein, who were followed by the Counts of Stolberg in 1535, introducing the Reformation to the area.

By 1581, Königstein belonged to the Electorate of Mainz, which had incorporated the old County through a legal dispute. Early in the 17th century, in connection with the Counterreformation, the castle was remodelled into a fortress. However, this newer military stronghold met its end in the French Revolutionary Wars when the French blew it up in 1796, although this may have been unintentional.

In 1803 Königstein passed to the Principality of Nassau-Usingen, which itself later merged with Nassau-Weilburg to form the Duchy of Nassau. By 1866 it was in Prussian hands, and since 1945 it has been part of Hesse. The three constituent municipalities Falkenstein, Mammolshain and Schneidhain were amalgamated with Königstein as part of Hesse's municipal reforms in 1972.

Königstein enjoyed an economic upswing from less wealthy times when the coldwater spa first opened in 1851. It reached its high point just before the First World War broke out. The designation Heilklimatischer Kurort was granted in 1935.

=== Jewish health resort and summer residence ===
Königstein was regarded as a "Jewish spa" – especially in the era of National Socialism – mainly due to the high proportions of Jewish guests (for example Otto Klemperer, Kurt Hahn, Carl Sternheim, Botho Graef, Reinhold Lepsius), who stayed in the Sanatorium Dr. Kohnstamm and Hotel Cahn, which offered kosher food. For these reasons, Königstein was an attractive city to visit for a day trip for many Jews in Frankfurt. Königstein became even more easily accessible from Frankfurt am Main in 1902, when the railway between Königstein and Frankfurt was built.

Königstein was also the residence of prominent Jewish citizens (for example Mathilde Hannah von Rothschild, Sigmund Kohn-Speyer, L. Albert Hahn, Hermann Wronker, Albert Katzenellenbogen, Julius Blau, Max Neisser, Adolf Sabor, Selmar Spier, the family of Richard Musgrave), who in turn brought their friends and guests. The poet Stefan George often visited his school friend Oskar Kohnstamm, and then after Kohnstamm's death in 1917 (and the sale of Kohnstamm's sanatorium) moved to Königstein to be near his sister, Anna George. In her apartment, he received members of the George-Kreis. George's and Kohnstamm's school friend Karl Wolfskehl had contacts to the Sanatorium Dr. Amelung, whose director had been a friend of Oskar Kohnstamm.

Carl Frankl (also Jewish) was the owner of the renowned Kohnstamm sanatorium from Kohnstamm's death in 1917 until 1938. Carl was a brother of the World War I fighter pilot Wilhelm Frankl (his brother Wilhelm had converted from Judaism to Christianity in order to marry his high school sweetheart). While in 1937, 24 hotels, hostels and guest houses still refused to comply with Nazi law and accepted Jewish guests, the following year, in 1938, all 54 hotels, hostels and guest houses in Königstein added the following sentence to their advertisements: "All the guest houses are run Jew-free."

In 1938 public discussions arose about keeping the name of the Sanatorium Dr. Kohnstamm or aryanizing it. Königstein's mayor preferred changing the name and commented that (should the name be kept) "the reputation of Königstein as "Jews' resort" would yet again be cemented in an irreparable way".

Even after the Holocaust famous Jewish people settled in Königstein. Thus, e.g. Max Dessoir moved here for his retirement (he had previously lived once before in the "Sanatorium Amelung"), as did publisher Samuel Fischer's wife Hedwig Fischer (née Landshoff). Paulette Goddard, Charlie Chaplin's wife, was a famous visitor of Königstein after World War II.

== Politics ==
Parties represented in the town council are the CDU, the SPD, the FDP and the Greens, as well as the ALK (Aktionsgemeinschaft Lebenswertes Königstein), a citizens' coalition. At the moment, Königstein is governed by an informal alliance of ALK and the CDU.

=== Coat of arms ===
Königstein's civic coat of arms was conferred in 1907. It is based on a town seal from 1535. The towers stand for the old Imperial Castle (Reichsburg). The Lords of Bolanden-Falkenstein are remembered in the red and gold field in the upper right (upper left heraldically speaking), as are the Counts of Nürings in the black lion, and the Lords of Eppstein in the three chevrons.

== Economy ==
=== Purchasing power ===
Königstein has an extraordinarily high level of purchasing power. In 2010, their purchasing power index was 191% compared to the national average, and with that the highest in Germany.

=== Transport ===
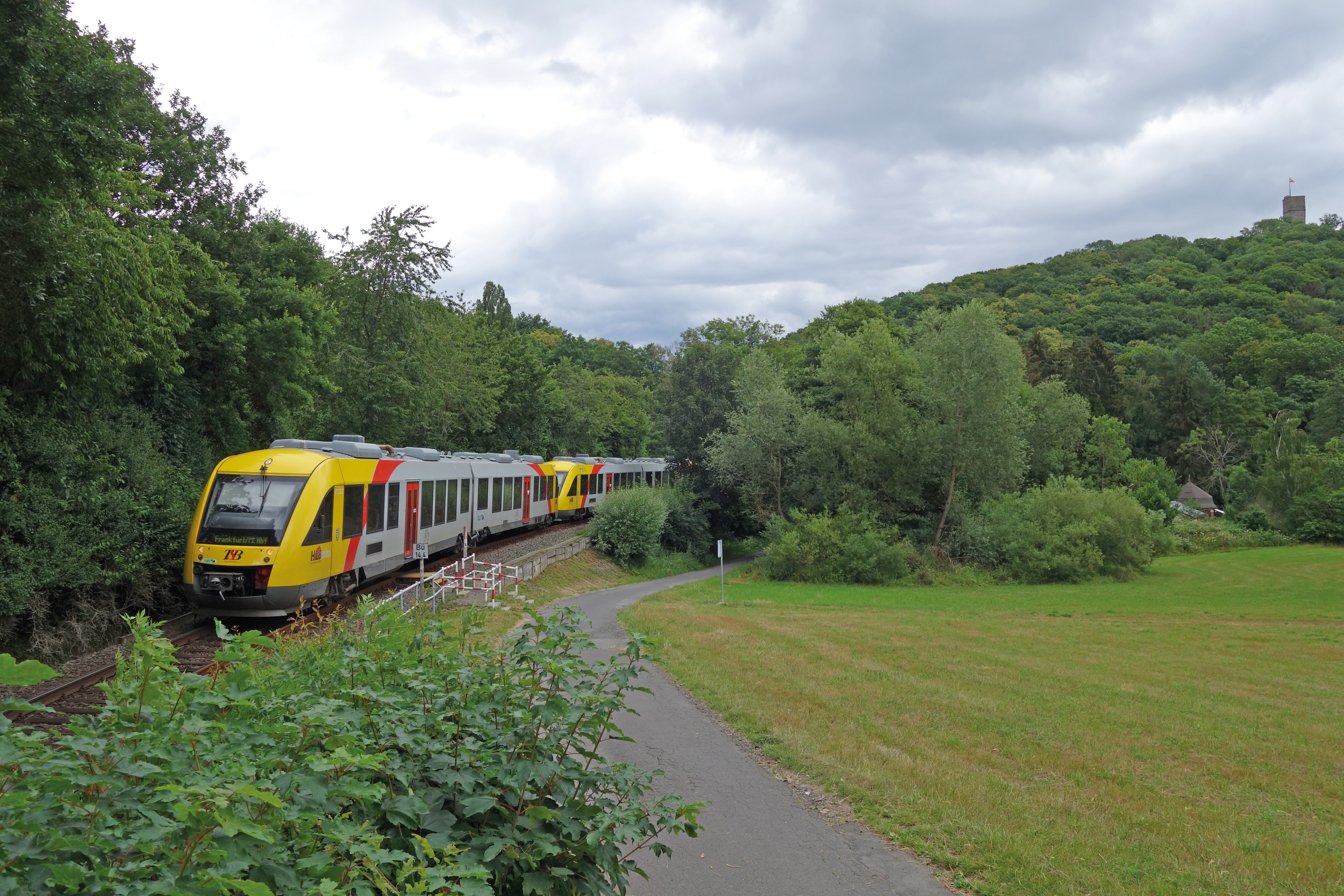
LINT 41 railcar underneath Königstein Castle heading for Frankfurt

Königstein is advantageously placed for driving. By way of Federal Highways (Bundesstraßen) B8 and B455, which meet in town at a roundabout, Autobahnen A 66 (Frankfurt-Höchst interchange), A 661 (Oberursel interchange) and A 3 (Niedernhausen interchange) can be reached in a matter of minutes. Königstein's advantageous placement, however, brings problems, too. Rush hour traffic, both in the morning and evening, regularly results in heavy traffic jams on the way into the roundabout.

The nearest airport is Frankfurt International Airport.

By way of the Königstein Railway (Frankfurt-Königsteiner Eisenbahn – FKE) and bus routes connecting the towns to the S-Bahn stations at Bad Soden (S 3) and Kronberg (S 4), Königstein is connected to Frankfurt Central Station and the whole railway network run by the Rhein-Main-Verkehrsverbund (Rhine-Main Transport Association, RMV), and it has at its disposal Königstein station and Schneidhain station.

=== Established businesses ===
Königstein im Taunus is an attractive place for business. The citizens' above-average buying power is a boon to local retail businesses. The town also has a number of few independent business and personnel consultants, often former managers from industry. Through the takeover of the well known German personnel consultancy Hofmann Herbold & Partner, Königstein was for years headquarters to the biggest international executive search firm Korn/Ferry. Several spinoffs brought into being by former Korn/Ferry employees are still in business in town now.

The Commerzbank maintains a large training and conference centre at the edge of town, which is also available to third parties. The Deutsche Bank also has one between Falkenstein and Kronberg.

== Town partnerships ==
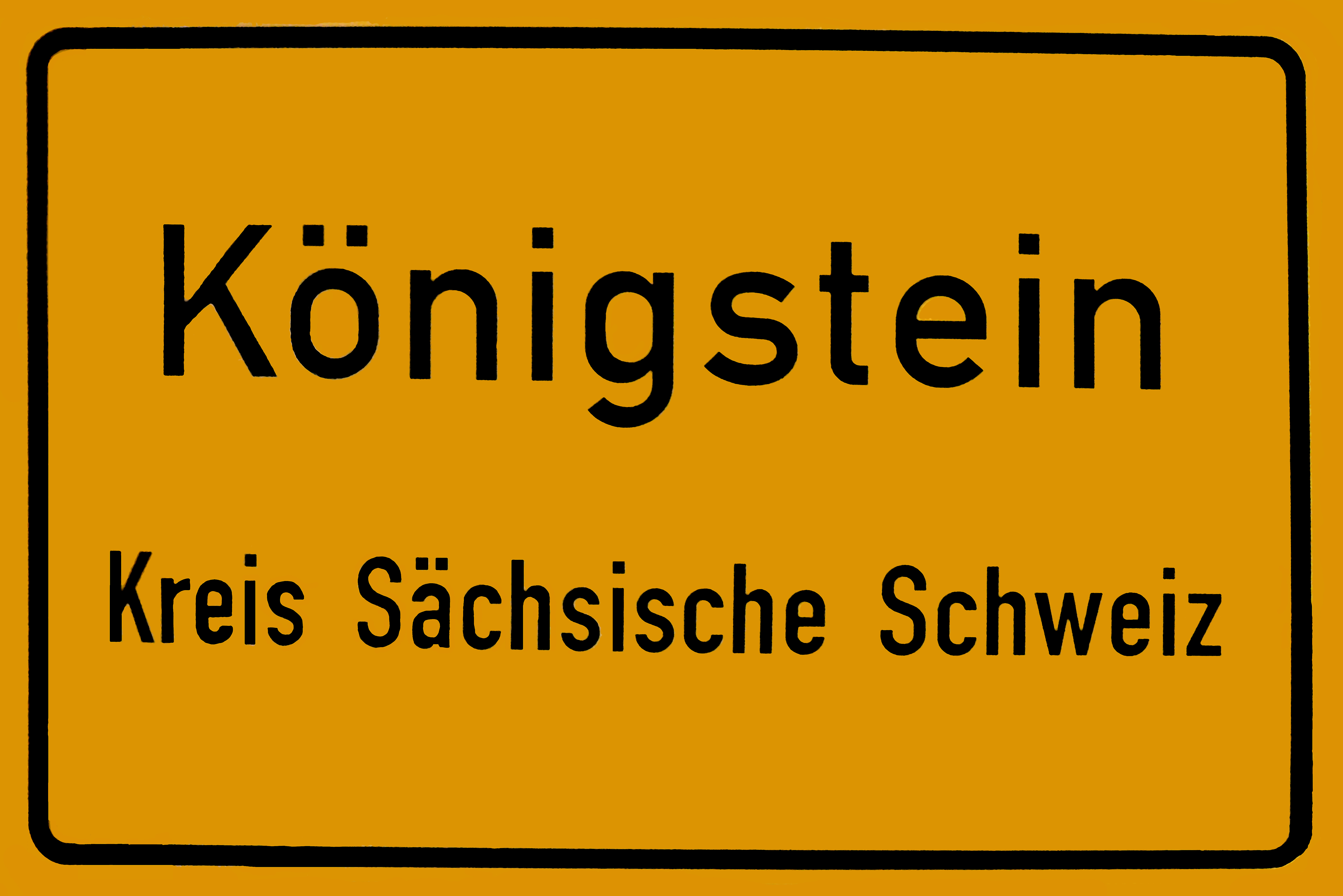
Road sign – "Königstein – Kreis Sächschische Schweiz" – Saxony

Königstein im Taunus maintains partnerships with the following towns:

- Le Cannet-Rocheville, France
- (Germany) Königstein, Saxony
- Kórnik, Poland
- Le Mêle-sur-Sarthe, France (with Falkenstein)

There is also a friendship agreement with:

- (Germany) Königstein in the Upper Palatinate

== Culture and sightseeing ==
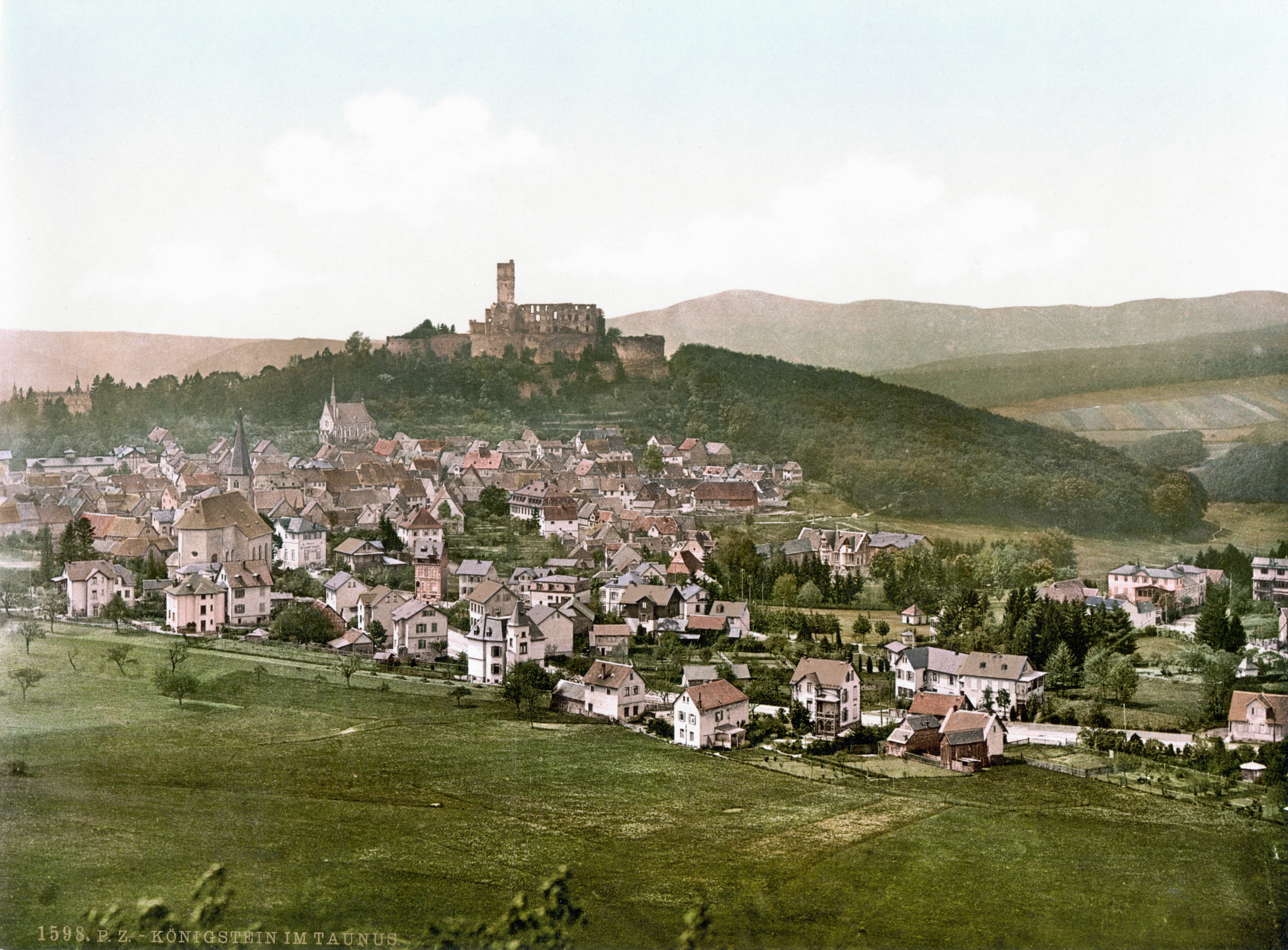
Königstein in the late 19th century

=== Regular events ===
The greatest folk festival in Königstein is the yearly Burgfest, or Castle Festival, at the Königstein Castle ruins. Moreover, early in the year, and in the summer, further events also take place there: Ritterturnier ("Knights' Tournament"), Theater auf der Burg ("Theatre at the Castle"), as well as various musical and film events. Since 2005 also a series of concerts called Mittelalter rockt die Burg ("Middle Ages rock the castle").

As a new open-air highlight, from 2006, the Burgfestspiele Königstein ("Königstein Castle Festival Games") will be held, bringing to the stage a multi-faceted cultural programme in the ruins: concerts and operatic and musical productions with large casts under the open sky. As well, business in the outlying communities is shaped by many festivals and activities.

=== Clubs ===
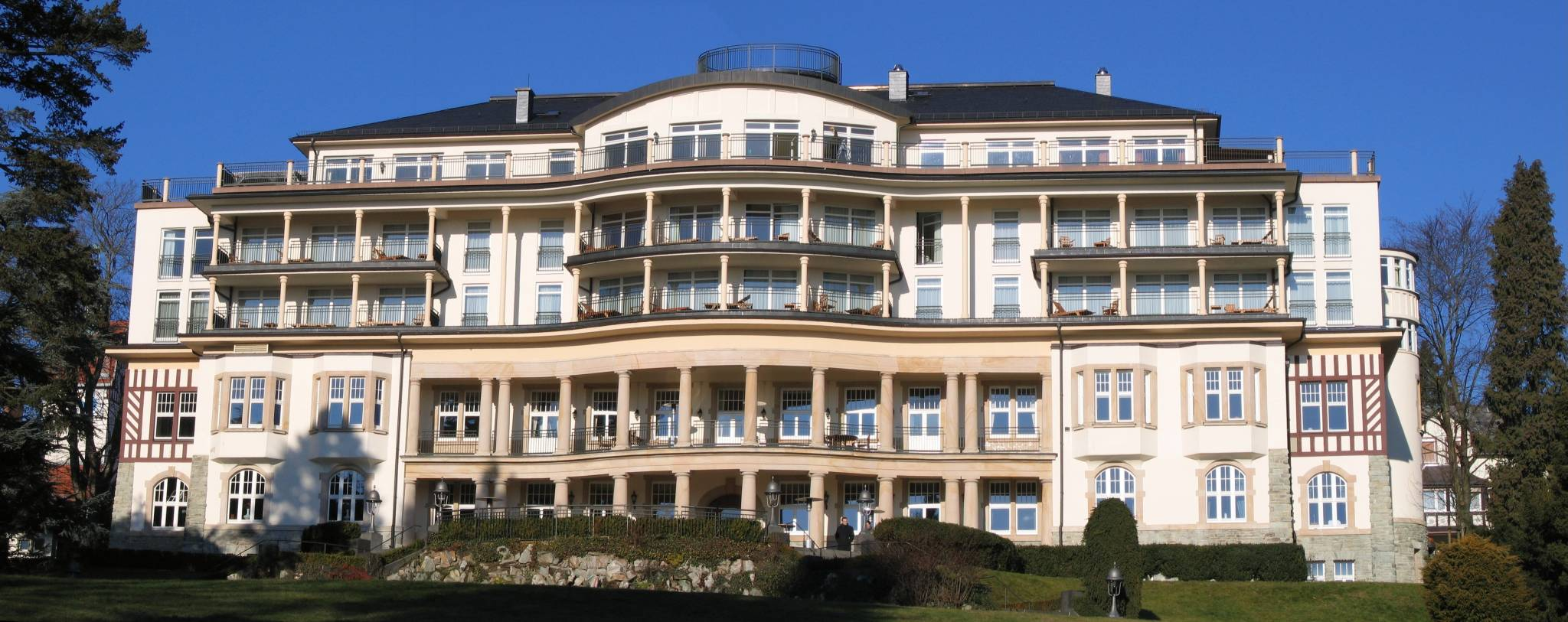
Hotel Kempinski in Königstein-Falkenstein

The Ritter von Königstein ("Knights of Königstein") have committed themselves to the Middle Ages and since 1998 have been staging a yearly Knights' Tournament with a mediaeval market at Königstein's picturesque castle ruins. The local young people who do this are supported in this endeavour by the club Stadtwache e.V. ("Town Watch").

Furthermore, each of Königstein's constituent communities has its own sport or football club. The biggest in the whole town is TSG Falkenstein, offering volleyball, judo, gymnastics, athletics, Gardetanz (a kind of dancing popular in Germany involving dancers in old, often 18th-century, military uniforms), and football, and having more than 800 members. The most successful football club is the 1. FC-TSG Königstein (a fusion of 1. FC Königstein and TSG Falkenstein), whose first team has been plying for many years in the top of the Regional Upper League (Gruppenliga). Moreover, the club has at its disposal 21 youth teams. Also, the SG (Spielgemeinschaft or "playing community") Schneidhain and FC Mammolshain play Football (soccer) in Königstein, both, however, at lower levels.

From 5 to 16 June 2006, on the occasion of the 2006 FIFA World Cup, the Brazil national team made its home at the Kempinski Hotel in Falkenstein, a five-star hotel originally built as an officers' retreat for Kaiser Wilhelm. The team trained at the "Altkönigblick" sport ground, 1. FC-TSG Königstein's usual facility.

The Königstein Fanfare Corps (Fanfarencorps Königstein) won the Europa Musikfestival in Rödemis in 2005 and the Solothurner Marching Parade, in which the Königstein Fanfare Corps was the first foreign club to participate.

Königstein also has, from singing clubs to a mandolin club, a karate and tennis club, and a volunteer fire brigade in every constituent community, more than 100 clubs.

=== Buildings ===
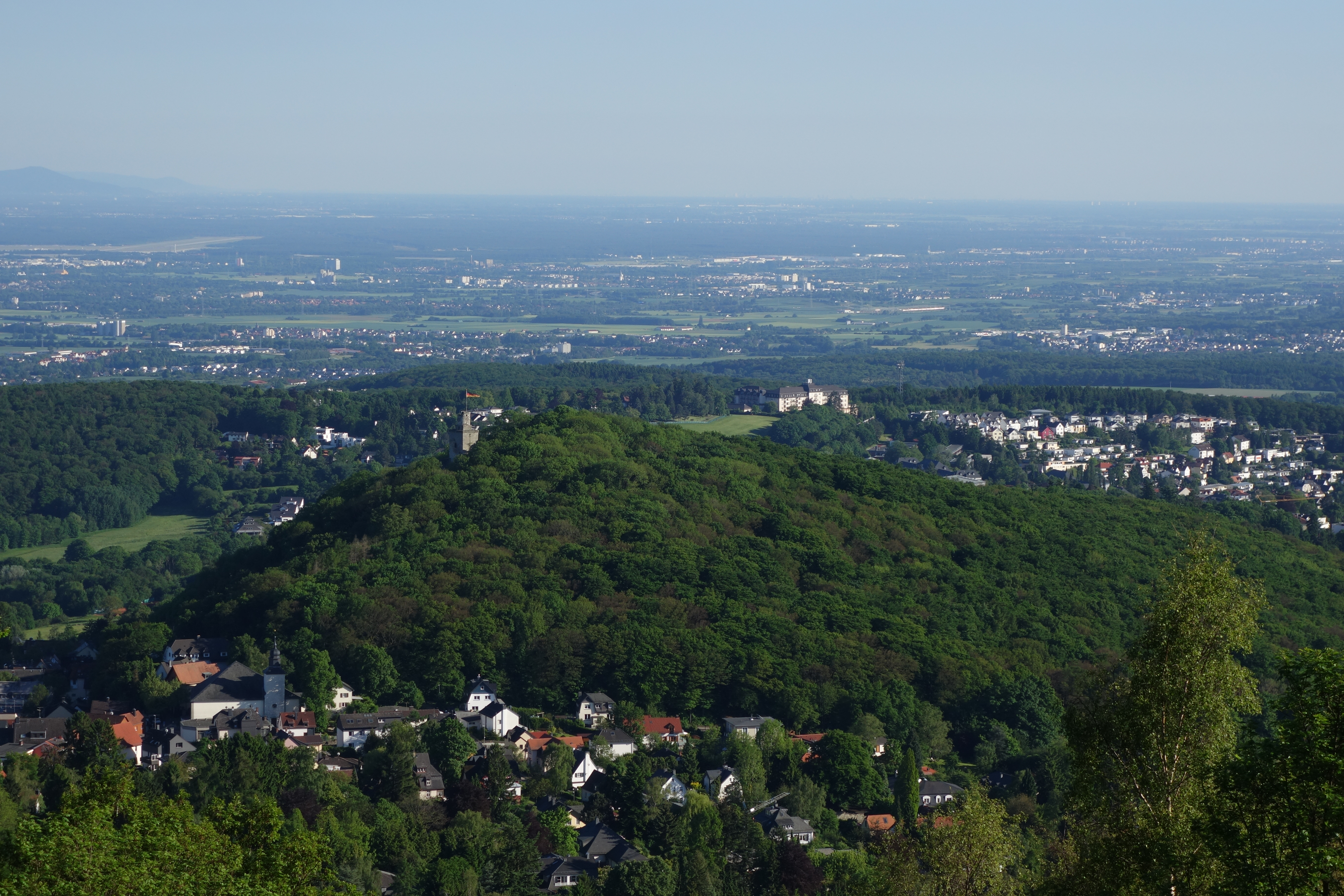
Falkenstein Castle on its hill as it can be seen from a scenic viewpoint at the foot of the Altkönig mountain

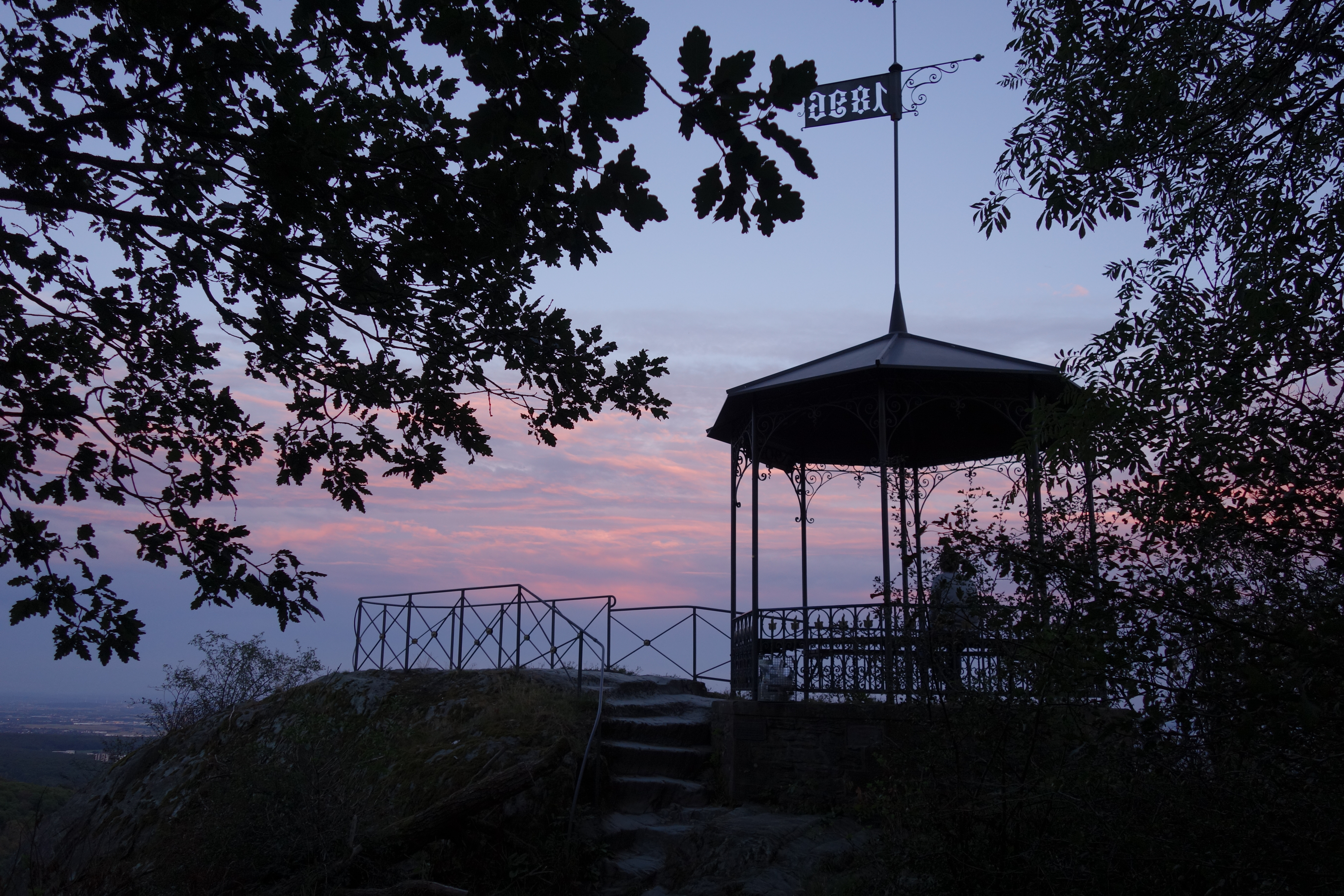
Viewpoint Dettweiler-Tempel at sunset

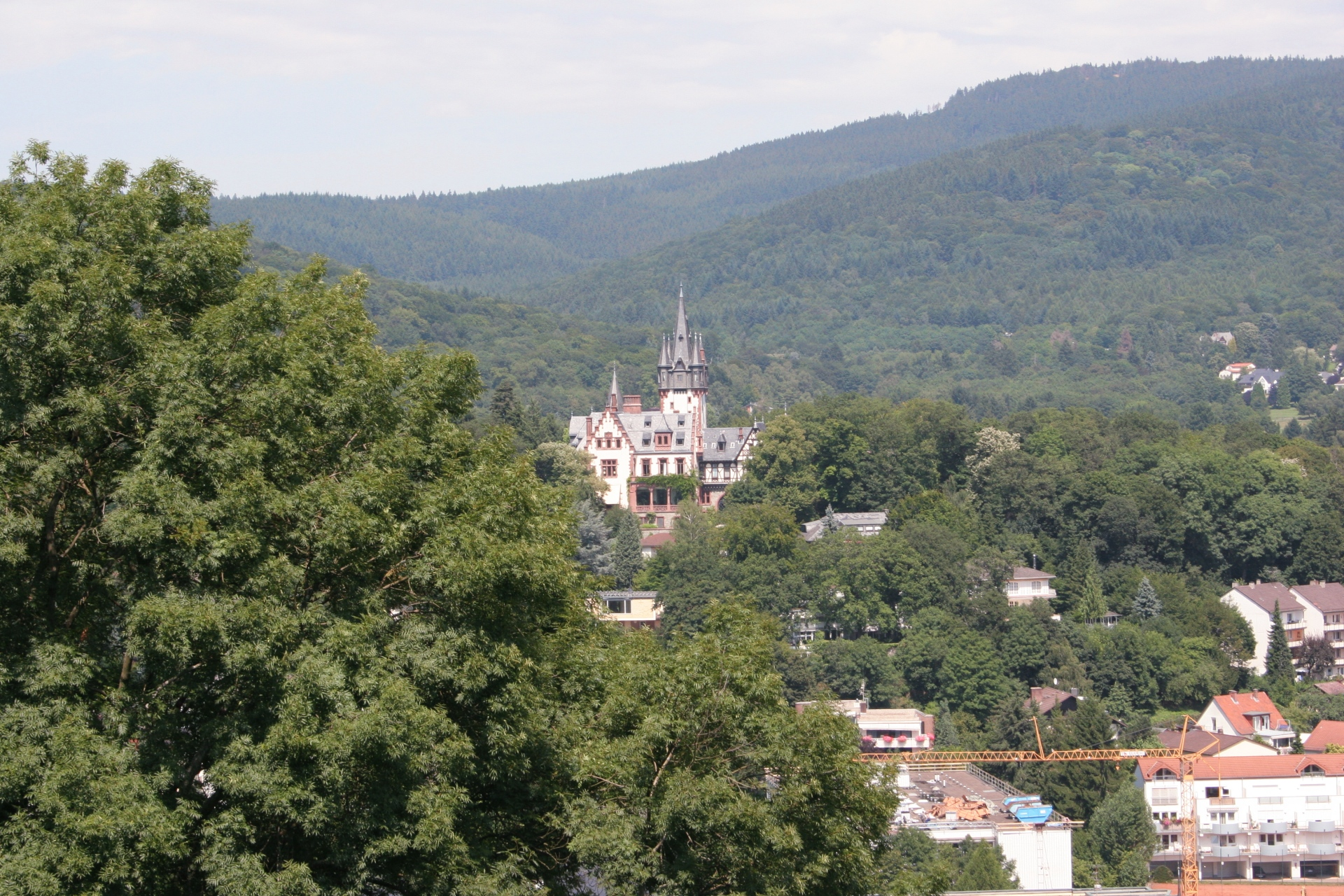
Villa Andreae

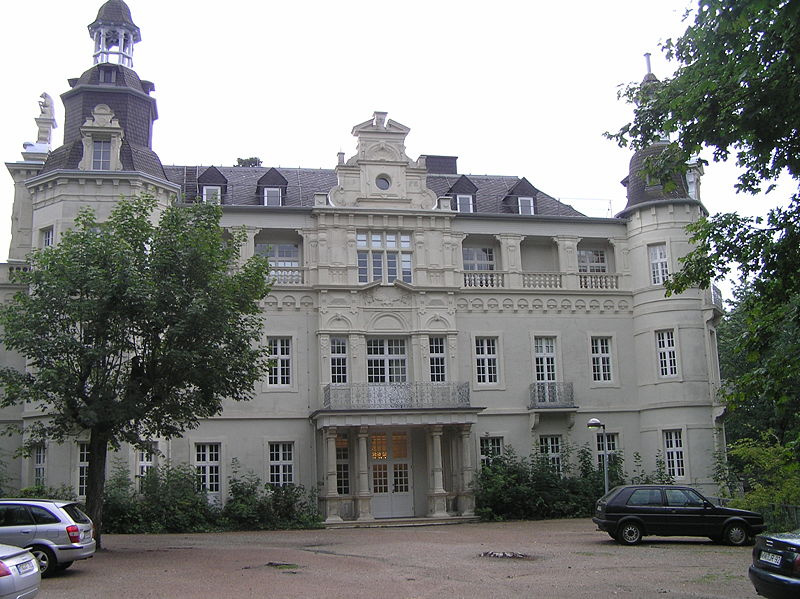
The rear view of the Luxemburgisches Schloss

Besides the town's landmark, the Königstein Castle ruins, other buildings are worth seeing, such as the historic Old Town with its Old Town Hall (Rathaus), and Falkenstein Castle, and the Old Town also found there. Nearby there is a viewpoint called Dettweiler-Tempel, named after physician Peter Dettweiler, specialised in pulmonology, who helped establishing Falkenstein as a spa town. The viewpoint allows a look over parts of Falkenstein as well as of Frankfurt and its surrounding area. Located at the top of a small wooded hill there is the Villa Andreae. Built in 1891 by Frankfurt Banker Albert Andreae de Neufville, it was transformed into a boarding school (Schülerheim) in the post-war years (1957–1987). Thoroughly restored, it became famous as Jürgen Schneider's headquarters from 1987 until his multi-billion-Deutsche-Mark bankruptcy in 1994.

Architecturally important in its time was the Haus der Begegnung ("Meeting House") built in 1955 for the headquarter of Catholic aid organisation Aid to the Church in Need.

The health spa, built in 1977, was controversial at the time because of its blue-orange colour scheme.

Former Grand Duke of Luxembourg Adolph von Nassau's stately home is known as the Luxemburgisches Schloss and houses now the court (Amtsgericht Königstein).

The Villa Rothschild, built in 1888 as a summer residence for Wilhelm Carl von Rothschild, was used in 1948 and 1949 as a conference venue by the Conference of Ministers-President to resolve disputed questions between the allied military governors and the Parlamentarischer Rat. Today it is used as a Hotel.

At the foot of the Burgberg ("Castle Mountain"), surrounded by a park through which flows the Woogbach and adjoining which is the Woogbach Valley is found Saint Angela's Ursuline Convent (Ursulinenkloster St. Angela), founded in 1884, and owning a like-named state-recognized private school.

Königstein is likewise well known for its idyllic Old Town. Its exclusive residential areas (also in Falkenstein) are mainly marked by Art Nouveau and its Heimatstil-influenced offshoots as well as 1960s Chic (bungalows). Lot sizes, however, are not comparable to those in other towns owing to new town planning and the building plans following therefrom.

=== Museums ===
The Castle and Town Museum (Burg- und Stadtmuseum) is found at the historic Old Town Hall (Altes Rathaus)

== Education ==
=== Schools ===
There are in Königstein various schools, among them three Gymnasien: the state Taunusgymnasium (formerly Taunusschule), the private St. Angela Schule and the private Bischof-Neumann-Schule.

==== Primary schools ====
- Grundschule Königstein
- Grundschule Falkenstein
- Grundschule Mammolshain
- Grundschule Schneidhain
- Kid's Camp Königstein

==== Secondary schools ====
- Taunusgymnasium Königstein, Popelschule
- Friedrich-Stoltze-Schule, Hauptschule and Realschule
- Bischof-Neumann-Schule, private school, state-recognized
- St.-Angela-Schule, private school, state-recognized

=== Philosophisch-Theologische Hochschule Königstein (1949–1978) ===
On 29 April 1949, a Königstein Philosophical-Theological College was founded in Königstein as a self-standing Catholic university, and acknowledged by the Hessian state government.

Bishop Maximilian Kaller – who was the first bishop with special authority over ethnic Germans who had been driven out of lost German territories at the end of the Second World War – appointed philosophy professor Erich Kleineidam to the new institution in late May 1947 as a professor. In 1948, he also became head of the seminary, and in 1949 rector of the Königstein Philosophical-Theological College. Besides Kleineidam, others who taught at the ecclesiastical university were Anton Janko, Philipp Schäfer and Leo Scheffczyk. Among well known graduates were Karl Gabriel, Johannes Gründel and Gerhard Pieschl.

The college produced 417 priests. It was dissolved on 15 February 1978.

== Literature ==
For three years, from 1970 until his death in 1973, the writer and journalist Herbert Kranz (born 4 October 1891 in Nordhausen; died 30 August 1973 in Braunschweig) lived here.

The book Königstein im Taunus: Geschichte und Kunst ("Königstein im Taunus: History and Art") by Beate Großmann-Hofmann and Hans-Curt Köster (Königstein im Taunus 2010 ISBN 978-3-7845-0778-1) offers a detailed outline of the town's history, its castle and its outlying communities. It also includes a detailed catalogue of many buildings and objects worthy of protection.

Also of importance is the book Juden in Königstein ("Jews in Königstein") by Heinz Sturm-Godramstein (ISBN 3-9800793-0-9). The former town archivist's documentation first appeared in 1983 and was reissued in 1998 almost unchanged.

== Healthcare ==
There is in Königstein a comprehensive offering of health services. Besides the baths, there are various clinics, among them a migraine clinic, a special clinic for psychosomatic illnesses, a heart clinic and a neurological clinic. The two spas of Königstein and Falkenstein have recently formed the entrance portal to Germany's first climatic healing park (Heilklimapark).

== Famous personalities ==
- Adelheid-Marie of Anhalt-Dessau (1833 – 1916)
- Max Dessoir (1867–1947), psychologist and art historian
- Franz Halder (1884–1972), Wehrmacht general
- Herbert Karl Ludwig Kranz (1891–1973) writer
- Walter Christaller (1893–1969), geographer
- Eugen Kogon (1903–1987), political scientist, writer, Antifascist
- Richard Musgrave (1910–2007), economist
- Leo Cardinal Scheffczyk (1920–2005)
- Birgit Friedmann (1960– ), athlete
- Hans Zimmer (1957– ), film composer and Oscar winner
- Father Werenfried van Straaten (1913–2003), called "Speckpater" ("Bacon Father"), founder of the international relief organization Aid to the Church in Need
- Michael Gross (1964–), swimmer, three-time Olympic gold medal winner
- Eva Pfaff (1961–), tennis player
- Charly Körbel (1954–), soccer player
- Jürgen Hardt (1963–), German Politician, Christian Democratic Union member of the Bundestag
