= Großer Feldberg =

Highest mountain in the Taunus mountains, Germany

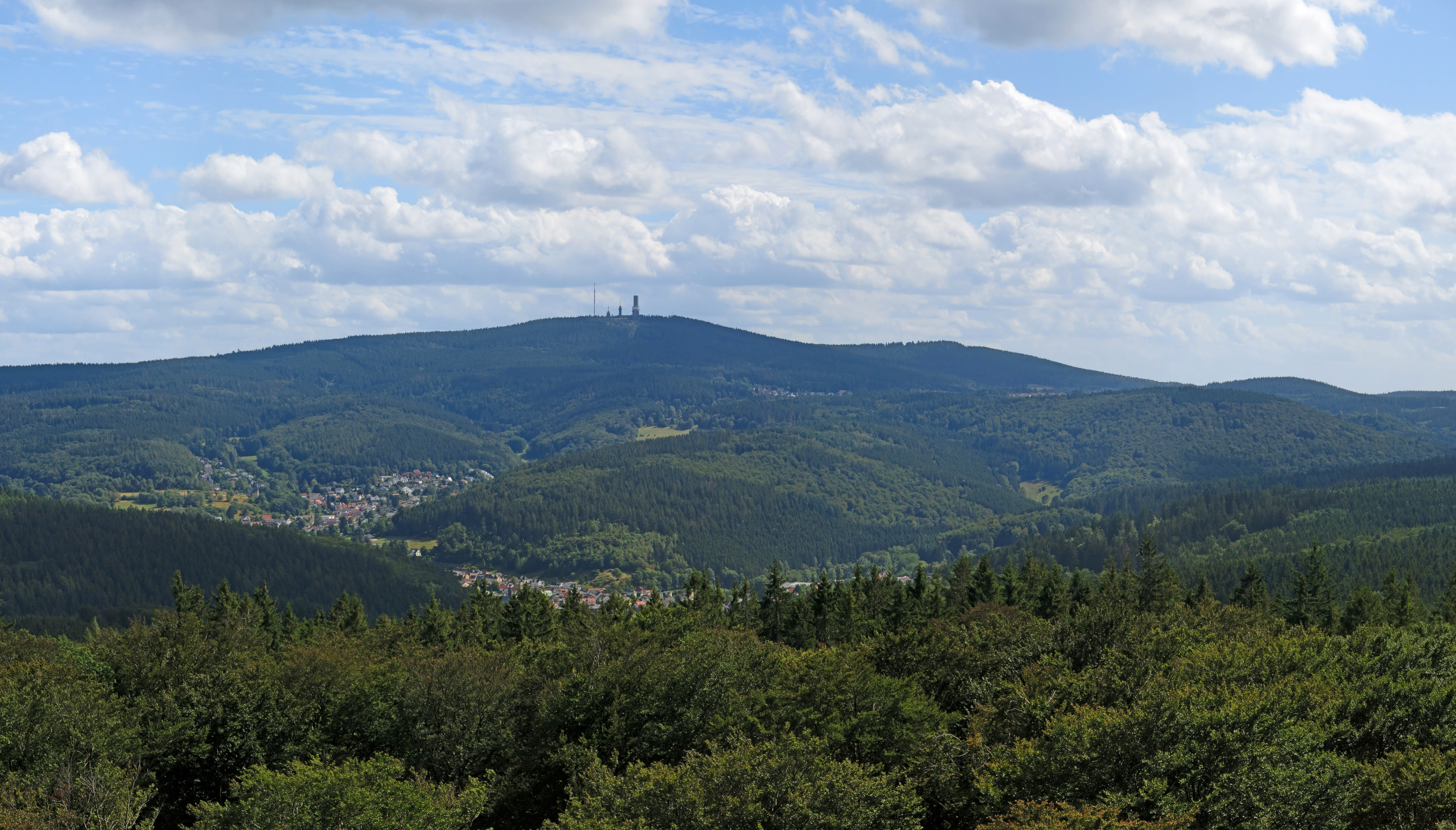
- Großer Feldberg as seen from the north (from observation tower on the mountain Pferdskopf)

Highest point
- Elevation: 879.5 m (2,885 ft)
- Prominence: 670 m (2,200 ft)
- Coordinates: 50°13′57″N 8°27′32″E

Naming
- Pronunciation: German: [ˈɡʁoːsɐ ˈfɛltbɛʁk]

Geography
- Location within Hesse
- Location: Hesse, Germany
- Parent range: Taunus

The Großer Feldberg ('Great Field Mountain') is, at a height of 879.5 metres, the highest elevation of the Taunus mountains, and of the entire Rhenish Massif. It is situated in the Hochtaunuskreis district in Hesse, Germany.

The Feldberg/Taunus transmitter mast is set at the top of the mountain. A lookout tower affords long-distance views onto the Taunus hills to the North and West and over and beyond the Rhein-Main plain to the South and East. A restaurant and a small hut offer food and drinks.

The mountain is accompanied by the Kleiner Feldberg, a subsidiary of 825 m at a distance of 1.3 km to the south-west, and the 798-metres-high Altkönig, 2.3 km to the south-east.

== Height ==
There is a considerable uncertainty on the exact height of the Großer Feldberg, because the height given in the various sources varies up to several metres.

- At the summit is the Feldberg summit cross including the summit register and information board, giving a height of 879.5 metres.
- The Geoportal of the Hessian State Office for Regional Management and Geo-information (Hessische Landesamt für Bodenmanagement und Geoinformation), gives the following heights in its online maps: 878 m on the H200 map of Hesse, 879 m on the PG50 and PG25 graphical maps and 878.5 m on the TK25 topographic map.
- The Geoportal of the BfN gives the following heights in its online maps: 880 m at map scale 1:500,000, 879 m at 1:250,000, 1:100,000, 1:50,000 and 1:25,000, and 878.5 m at 1:10,000 and 1:5,000.
- Laser scanning data results to a height of 880.9 m.
- In literature, even more heights are given, such as 881.5 m.
Summit cross with height information

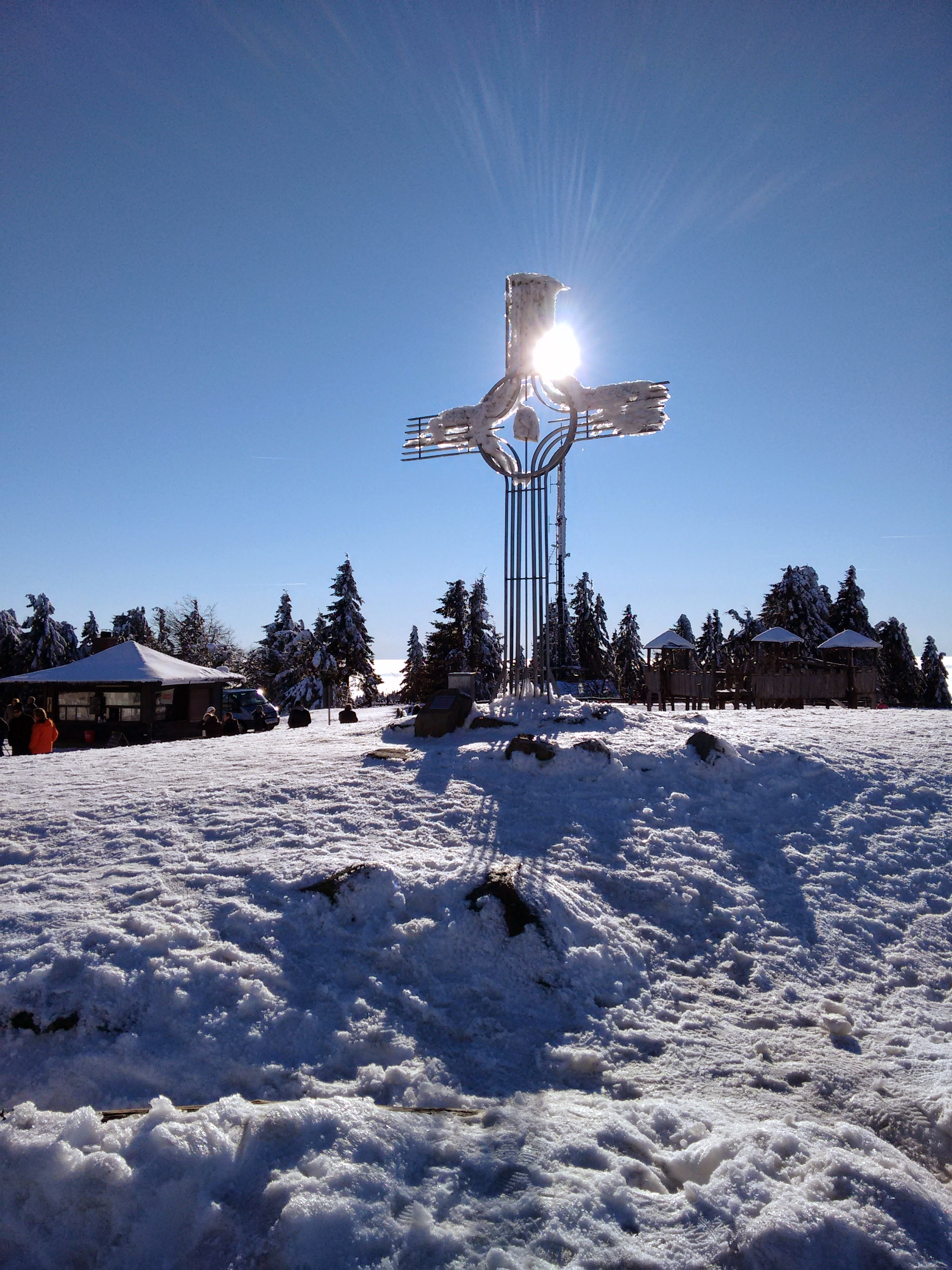
Summit cross in winter

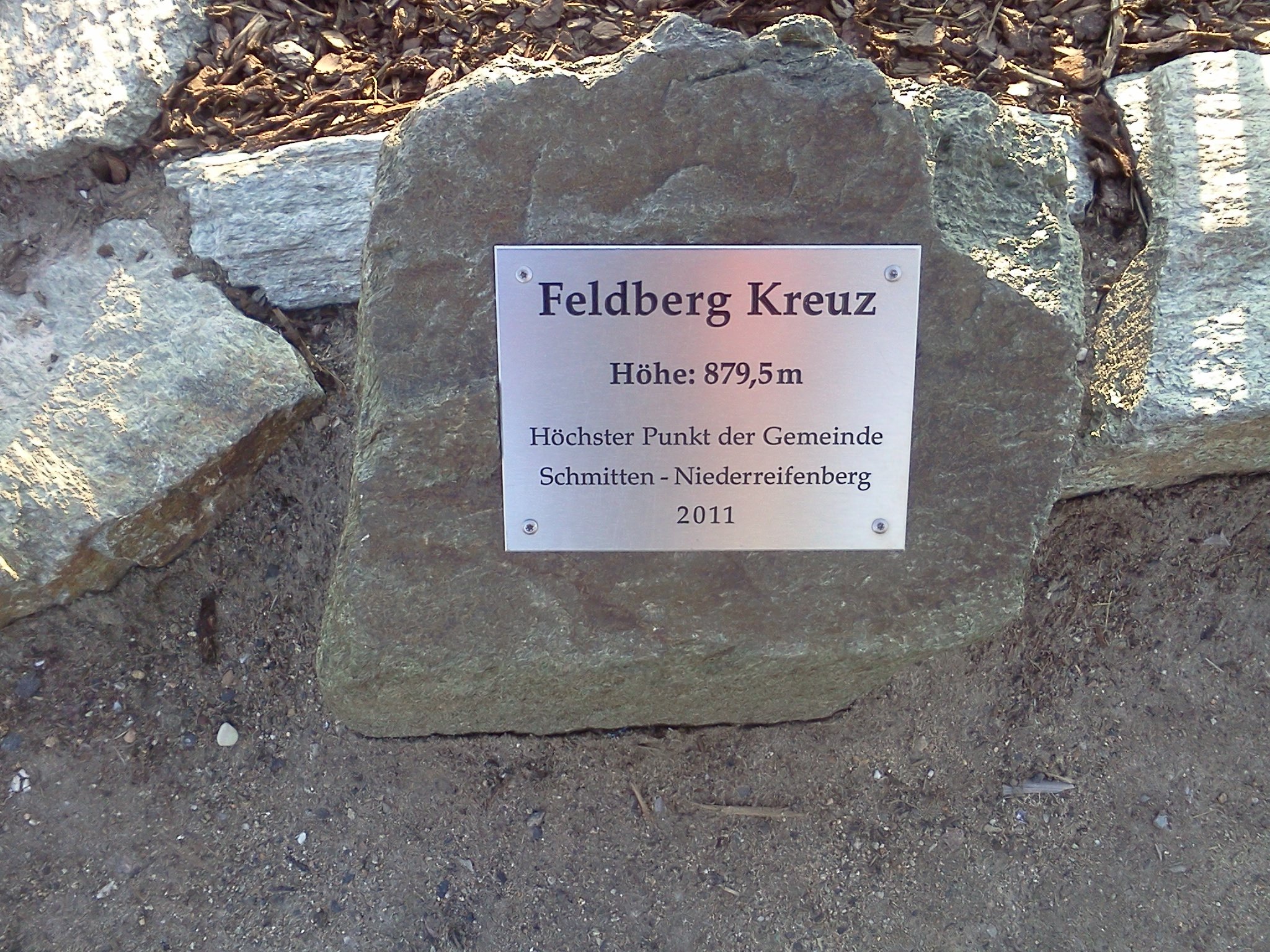
Elevation plaque on the summit cross

== Tourism and Facilities ==
The treeless summit of the Großer Feldberg and the surrounding forests are a popular destination for motorbikers and cyclists in the summer, tobogganers and cross-country skiers in winter, and hikers year-round. Two small rope tow ski lifts are located on the North and West slopes of the mountain at the village of Oberreifenberg, and a larger ski lift used to extend up the North slope almost to the summit until the 1980s. The former lift track is popular with tobogganers.

The summit is easily reached from Frankfurt in approximately 30 minutes via roads from Oberursel, Königstein or by bus from these towns.

Since the top can be easily reached by car, crowds and a lack of parking spaces near the top are a common sight on weekends in fine weather.
