= Falkenstein Castle (Taunus) =

Falkenstein Castle Burgruine Falkenstein
- Neu-Falkenstein
- Königstein im Taunus-Falkenstein
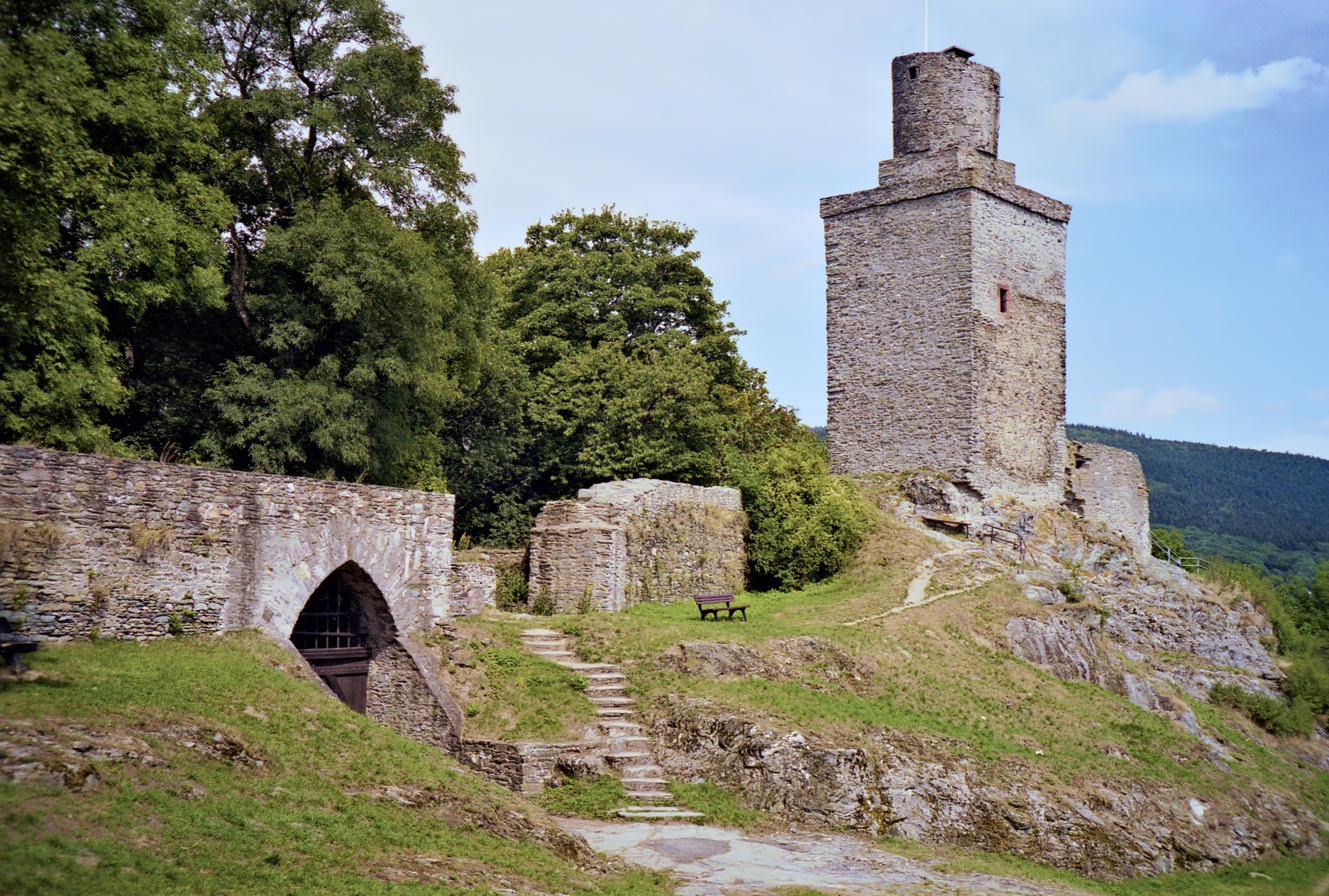
- Falkenstein in 2001. View of the gate and bergfried from the interior of the castle

Site information
- Type: hill castle
- Code: DE-HE
- Condition: bergfried, enceinte

Location
- Coordinates: 50°11′25″N 8°28′36″E
- Height: 450 m above sea level (NHN)

Site history
- Built: around 1350

Garrison information
- Occupants: nobility

Falkenstein Castle (German: Burg Falkenstein), also called New Falkenstein (Neu-Falkenstein), is a ruined hill castle at 450 m above sea level (NHN) in the eponymous climatic spa of Falkenstein, a quarter of Königstein im Taunus in the county of Hochtaunuskreis in the German state of Hesse.

== Location ==
The castle ruins are visible from a long way off, both from Königstein im Taunus as well as from the direction of Kronberg im Taunus. From the ruins the city of Frankfurt am Main and large parts of the Rhine-Main Plain may be seen. However, the site is not overrun by tourists, partly because it is not signed from outside the village. The path to the castle is located by the Catholic Church on Reichenbachweg; here there is a signpost. The castle can be reached only on foot. The path from the church is about 330 metres long and runs uphill. Other neighbouring castles are Königstein about 1.5 kilometres to the southwest and Kronberg about 3 kilometres southeast.

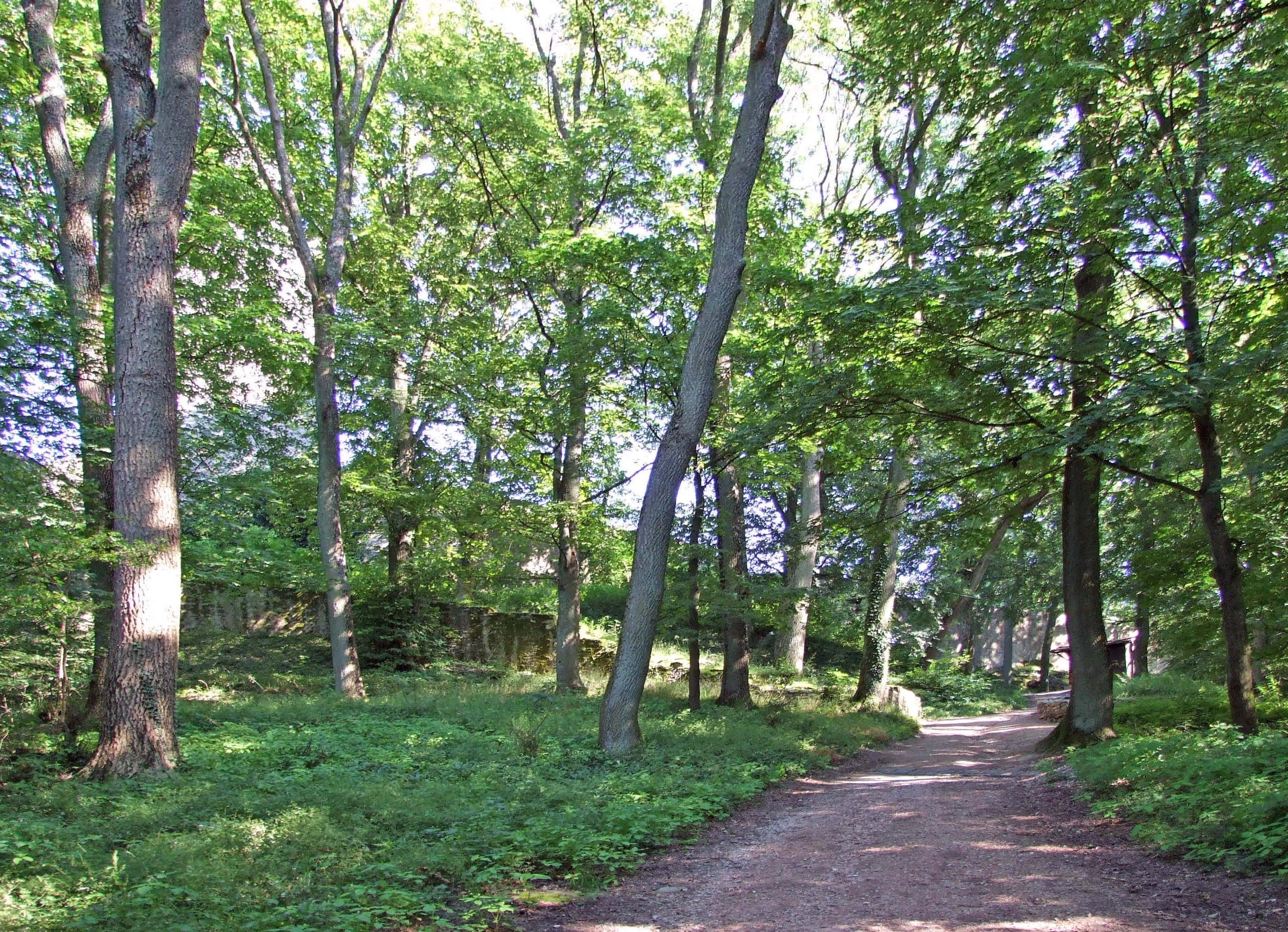
Footpath to the ruins

== History ==
The castle was built in the mid-14th century as New Falkenstein (Burg Neu-Falkenstein) by the lords of Bolanden-Falkenstein, whose family home was on the Donnersberg hill at Falkenstein Castle in the Palatinate, and immediately next to Nüring Castle, which probably dates from the 11th century. It was first mentioned in 1364 in connexion with the imperial war against Philip VI of Falkenstein.

The castle changed owners in quick hereditary succession from the end of the 14th century. The counts of Sponheim were followed by Philip of Nassau (1385) and the lords of Hattstein as well as the lords of Kronberg, who were initially vassals (Lehnsmannen) and then owners. Around 1500 the enceinte was reinforced with flanking towers and the late Gothic bergfried converted into the butter churn shape (similar to that in Idstein). In the early 17th century the castle passed into the possession of the lords of Staffel.

In a deed dated 18 January 1680 Adolf Johann Karl Freiherr von Bettendorf (successor to the childless Gerhard Adam von Staffel) received the schloss and village of Falkenstein as a Nassau-Weilburg fief.

The end of the castle came after the Thirty Years' War. It lost its importance and fell into decay. Parts of it were still occupied until about 1780 by the lords of Bettendorf, but it was then demolished. The gradual destruction of the rest of the site was not stopped until 1842. The gateway visible today is a reconstruction dating from that period.

In 1945 the castle was transferred to the municipality of Falkenstein. Because it did not have a "castle inn", a water main and sanitation, festivals, plays and overnight stays at the castle were not initially possible. To preserve the local landmark the Falkenstein Local History Society became involved in practice using donations. Every year in summer there is a public festival by the Falkenstein Male Voice Choir (MGV Falkenstein). This club also uncovered the only cellar in the castle interior in the 1970s.

The castle is commemorated in literature by the poet Stefan George (1868-1933) in his last anthology, Das Neue Reich (1928), with the poem Burg Falkenstein: To the wooded hilltop, I climb up near to you, where on the gnarled square corner tower, the round tower rises up..." ("Zur bewaldeten kuppe / stieg ich an neben dir / Wo auf rauh-gradem eckturm / sich der rundturm erhebt [...]"

== Description ==
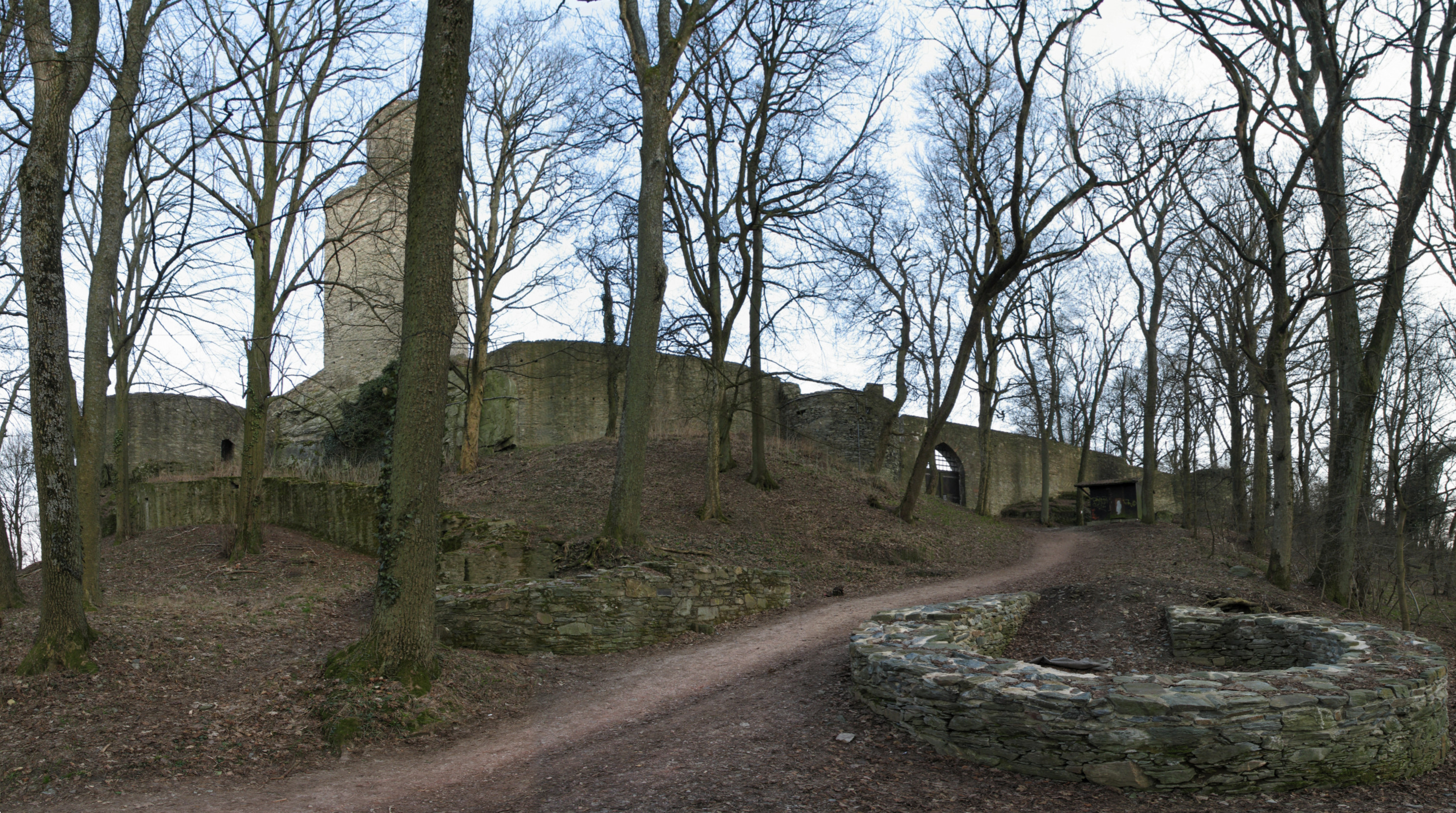
The castle from the outside.

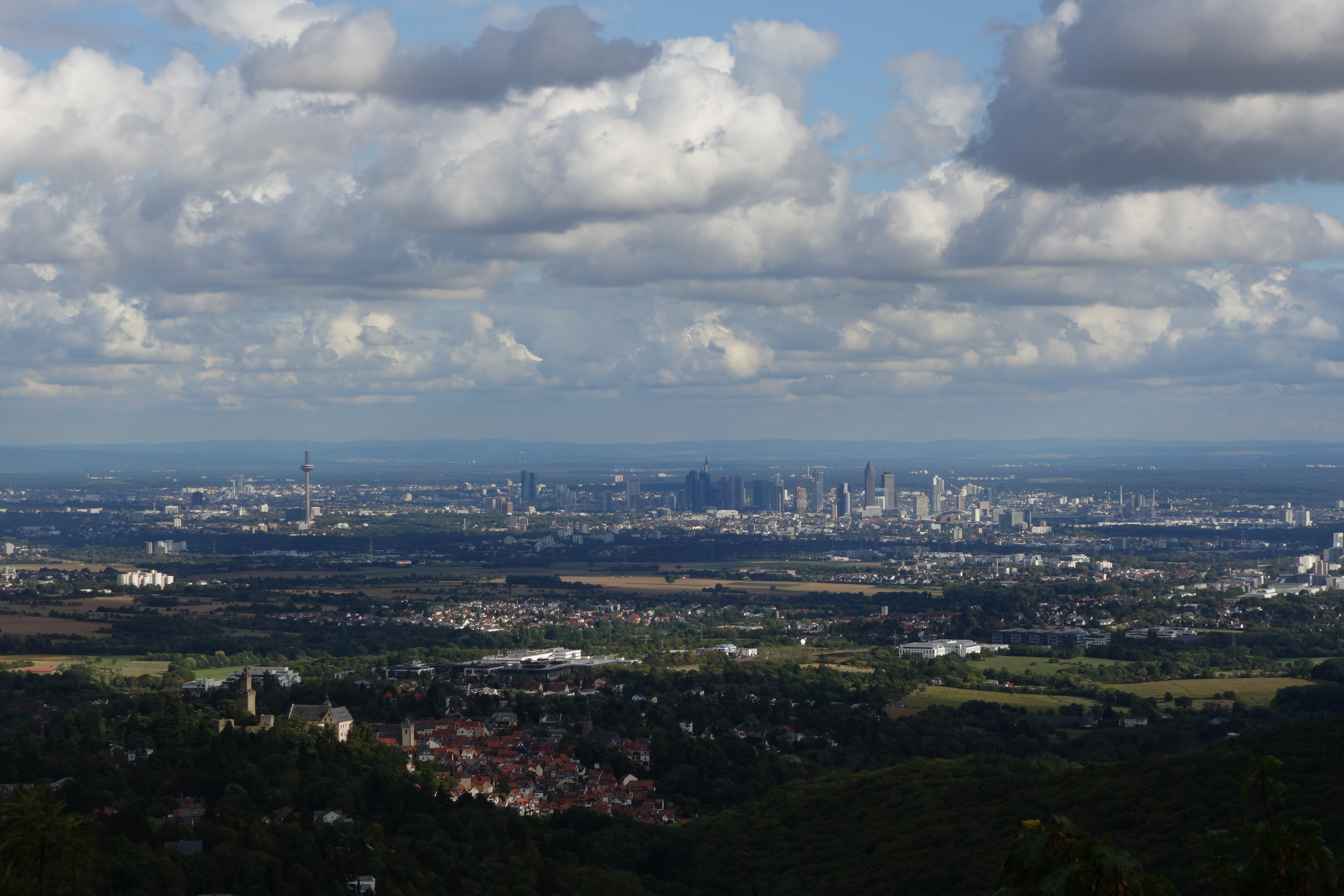
View from Falkenstein Castle to Frankfurt and the beginning Upper Rhine Plain. On the left in the foreground Kronberg Castle can be seen.

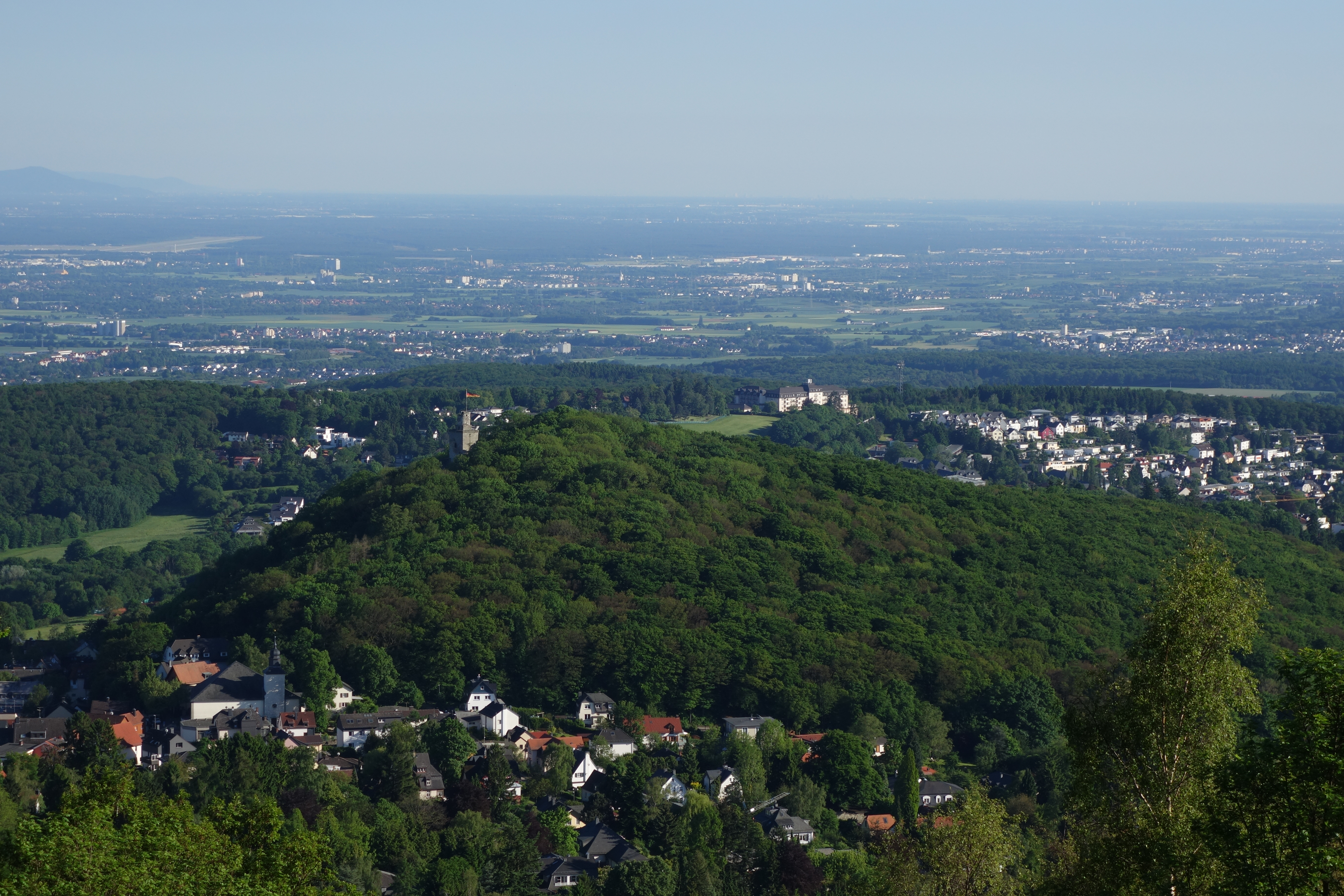
The castle on its hill as it can be seen from a viewpoint at the foot of the Altkönig mountain.

The enceinte, part of the shield wall, the 18-metre-high bergfried on a base of 6.75 by 6.75 metres with its elevated entrance at a height of four metres, remains of a building on the east side and two artillery towers are well preserved. The size of the inner ward was about 90 by 30 metres. The square bergfried dates from the 14th century; the round turret on the top from the 15th century.

The whole of the ruins are currently (as at end 2013) open from March to October daily from 10:00 to 19:00. From November to February the castle may be visited only at weekends from 10:30 to 16:30. Usually access is controlled by members of the Falkenstein Local History Society who charge an entry fee of 2 euros per person. The nearby Dettweiler Temple is a viewing point that is open at all times.

The bergfried is currently not open, but is opened during festivals. In the summer months it is also opened to the public about once a month - usually on a Saturday. The castle also offers very good views of the Rhine-Main Plain from the Opel Zoo and Kronberg Castle.
The castle is part of the "Three Castles Way" (3-Burgen-Weg Königstein – Falkenstein – Kronberg) established in 2013 by the Taunus Club.

== Literature ==
- Magnus Backes, Hans Feldtkeller: Kunsthistorischer Wanderführer Hessen. Pawlack, Herrsching, 1984, ISBN 3-88199-133-6
- Beate Großmann-Hofmann und Hans-Curt Köster: Königstein im Taunus: Geschichte und Kunst, 2nd expanded and updated edition, 2010, Verlag Langewiesche, Königstein im Taunus, ISBN 978-3-7845-0777-4, pp. 140f.
- Rudolf Knappe: Mittelalterliche Burgen in Hessen. 800 Burgen, Burgruinen und Burgstätten. 3rd edition, Wartberg-Verlag. Gudensberg-Gleichen, 2000, ISBN 3-86134-228-6, pp. 465f.
- Anette Löffler: Die Herren und Grafen von Falkenstein (Taunus): Studien zur Territorial- und Besitzgeschichte, zur reichspolitischen Stellung und zur Genealogie eines führenden Ministerialengeschlechts; 1255 – 1418. (Quellen und Forschungen zur hessischen Geschichte 99), ISBN 3-88443-188-9, Darmstadt, 1994
- Schlösser, Burgen, alte Mauern. published by Hessendienst der Staatskanzlei, Wiesbaden, 1990, ISBN 3-89214-017-0, pp. 217f.
