= Hünerberg =

Coordinates: 50°12′03″N 8°31′02″E

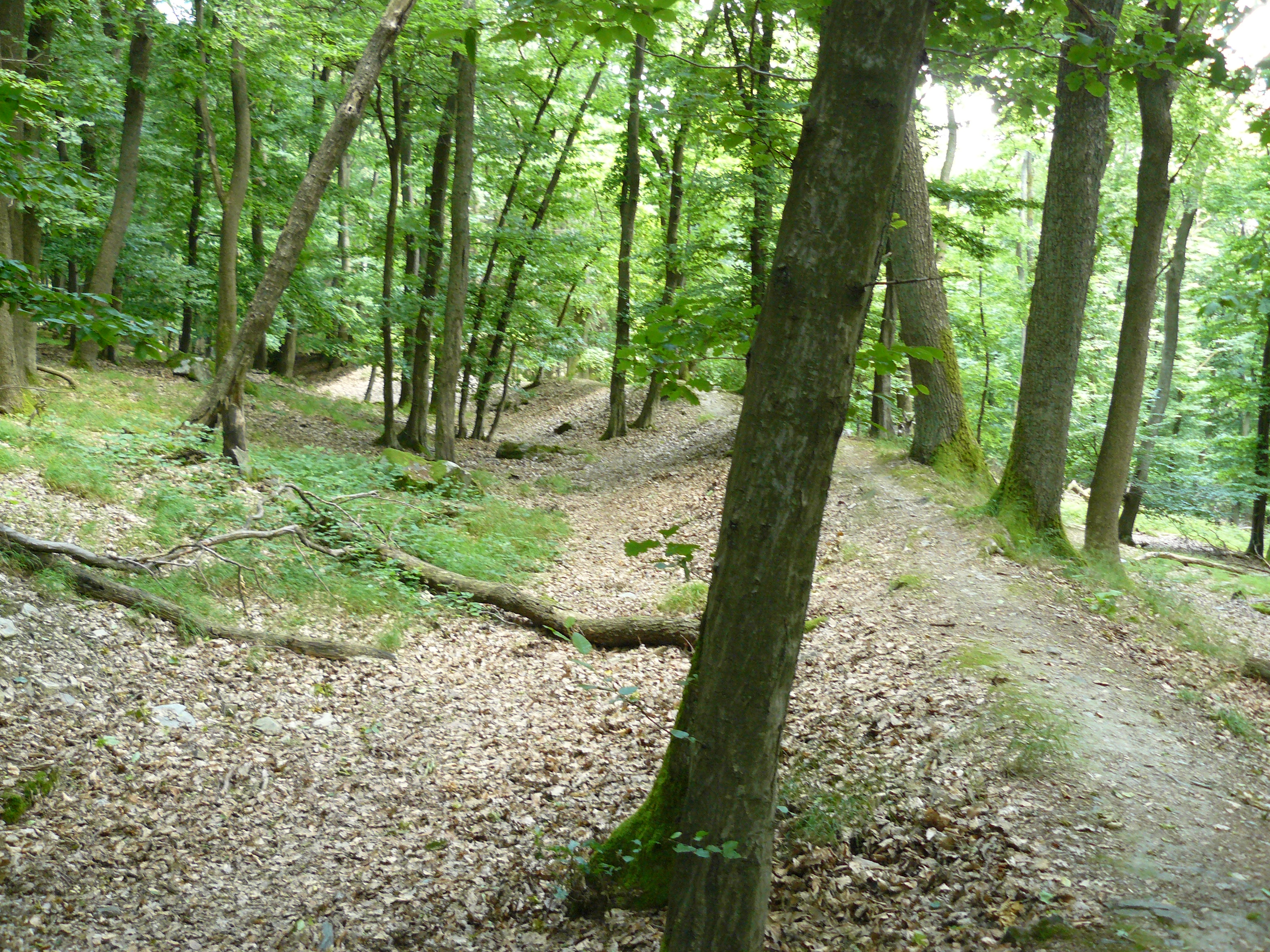

Highest point
- Elevation: 375 m (1,230 ft)

Geography
- Location: Hesse, Germany

Hünerberg is a hill in Hesse, Germany.

In the era of Julius Caesar and Augustus it was part of the territory of the Batavi. Drusus built a fort there shortly before his German campaign.
