= Herbert Kranz =

German writer (1891–1973)

Herbert Karl Ludwig Kranz, pseudonym Peter Pflug (born 4 October 1891 in Nordhausen; died 30 August 1973 in Braunschweig) was a German writer.

== Biography ==
After graduating from the Städtisches Reform-Realgymnasium in Berlin-Wilmersdorf in 1910, Kranz studied German, philosophy and history in Berlin and Leipzig. At the start of World War I he volunteered, but was discharged two years later due to illness as a lieutenant. He then married Ulrike Reck. After starting as a scientific assistant at the Youth Welfare Office in 1918, he took on several jobs in the literary field in addition to his own literary activities with various publications. He worked as a director at the theater in Düsseldorf in 1920 and in the Netherlands in 1923. From 1925 he worked first as a freelancer, then as an editor at the Rhein-Mainische-Volkszeitung in Frankfurt am Main, which belonged to the Herder publishing group, and from 1927 produced the children's newspaper Weg in die Welt as its supplement. From 1930 to 1933, he was a professor of German at the Halle (Saale) Pedagogical Academy in teacher training, without having a teaching degree himself. After Hitler's rise to power, Kranz was dismissed from the academy in 1933 because of his liberal views. He found employment as a local editor at the Frankfurter Zeitung and, in parallel, at the Illustrierte Blatt. At the same time he worked as a freelance writer. In 1941, for example, he wrote Hinter den Kulissen (Behind the Scenes), an anti-Semitic pamphlet about French politics from 1933 to 1940. In 1943, the Frankfurter Zeitung was closed down and he was banned from his profession by the Reichsverband der Deutschen Presse (Reich Association of the German Press) for his drama Der Ritt mit dem Henker (The Ride with the Hangman), whereupon the Illustrierte also dismissed him. His book Zeugnis der Zeiten was, however, recommended by Alfred Rosenberg's "Hauptamt Schrifttum" for Nazi libraries.

After the war, he lived as a freelance writer in Vachendorf, Stuttgart, Gebersheim and, from 1970, in Königstein im Taunus. He died in 1973.

== Bibliography ==
=== Ubique Terrarum novels ===
Herbert Kranz celebrated his greatest literary successes in the field of children's and youth literature. At the age of 60, he began his most successful series of novels based around the fictional society Ubique Terrarum. This 10-volume series describes the adventures and experiences of a group of six men (an Englishman named Stephen Slanton - the chief, an Irishman named Patrick Cromby - Plumpudding, two Frenchmen : first Cyprian Bombardon - as cook lamprey, second Gaston of Montfort, honorary knight of the Sovereign Order of Malta and Count of Darifant - the count, two Germans, namely Dr. Peter Geist - called GG, the Great Spirit (in many ways inspired by the Hallens pedagogue Adolf Reichwein) and his friend Bertram Kunke, as a 'character' and from volume 6 onwards, instead of him, the young Indian Tschandru-Singh). The stories are set in Afghanistan, Brazil, the United States, a Caribbean island, Greenland, Malaysia, Sardinia, Morocco, Lebanon, and southern France, among other places.

The novels were written between 1953 and 1958 and were all first published by Herder in Freiburg. All the novels contain an alphabetical appendix to the countries, places, people, and expressions described, which was not common in juvenile literature at the time. His grandson Georg Kranz reissued the series as paperbacks with an updated glossary from 2004 to 2010.

- Volume 1: In the Clutches of the Unnamed, ISBN 3-8330-1045-2
- Volume 2: Crashed in the Jungle, ISBN 3-8334-0779-4
- Volume 3: Death in Skeleton Canyon, ISBN 3-8334-1825-7
- Volume 4: Guiltless among the Guilty, ISBN 978-3-8370-1567-6
- Volume 5: Escape to the Ice Shark Hunters, ISBN 978-3-8370-1769-4
- Volume 6: Command of the Rajah, ISBN 978-3-8370-6967-9
- Volume 7: The Island of the Persecuted, ISBN 978-3-8370-8340-8
- Volume 8: The Night of Betrayal, ISBN 978-3-8370-9270-7
- Volume 9: The House of the Seven Towers, ISBN 978-3-8391-6922-3
- Volume 10: The Sign of the Serpent, ISBN 978-3-8423-3656-8

=== Children's books ===
- Schnucki-Has und Miesemau, 1929
- Mit Vollgas (unter dem Pseudonym Peng), 1929
- Lampes Wochenende (Pseudonym: Peng), 1930
- Die lieben Tiere, 1934
- Bei den Oster-Hasen, 1934
- Kasper kommt vor Gericht, 1934
- Häschen Klein ging allein …, Verse 1935
- Hänschen Didelhänschen!, Kinderreime 1935
- So fahren wir, 1937
- Die tolle Autofahrt, 1938
- Putzi, 1938
- Von Mutz und Stropp und dem Häslein Hopp-Hopp, 1938
- Der Geburtstag Verse, 1939

=== Historical narratives ===
These include the series "The Voice of the Past" (1960-1964), also published by Herder in Freiburg. A historical personality is the main character of each book.

- Volume 1: The Way to Freedom (about Carl Schurz), 1960
- Volume 2: The Son of the Lion (about Henry the Lion), 1961
- Volume 3: The Judge on Trial (about Johannes Kepler), 1961
- Volume 4: King for a Time (about Scipio the Younger), 1962
- Volume 5: The Heir to the Throne (about Prince Akbar), 1963
- Volume 6: The Third President (about President Thomas Jefferson), 1964

=== Adventure Series ===
- Verschleppt, after Robert Louis Stevenson's Kidnapped, Volker-Verlag Cologne 1934
- His Friend the Buccaneer, after Daniel Defoe's Captain Singleton, Herder Freiburg 1964
- Robin the Red, after Walter Scott's Rob Roy, Herder Freiburg 1965
- Der Elfenbeinthron, after a Persian heroic legend by Firdausi, Herder Freiburg 1966
- North Tower One Hundred and Five, after Charles Dickens' A Tale of Two Cities, Herder Freiburg 1967
- Der abenteuerliche Simplicissimus, after Hans Jakob Christoffel von Grimmelshausen, Herder Freiburg 1967
- Escape from Venice, after James Fenimore Cooper's The Bravo, Herder Freiburg 1965
- All Hands On Deck, after Herman Melville's White-Jacket, Herder Freiburg 1968

=== Other works on historical themes ===
- Der junge König
- Der alte Fritz
- Bismarck und das Reich ohne Krone, Franckh Stuttgart 1960
- Schwarzweißrot und Schwarzrotgold, Franckh Stuttgart 1961
- Das Ende des Reichs, Franckh Stuttgart 1961
- Das Buch vom deutschen Osten
- Der Retter des Stammes
- Die Fundgrube
- Der Engel schreibts auf
- Zeitung Funk und Fernsehen
- Hinter den Kulissen der Kabinette und Generalstäbe – Eine französische Zeit- und Sittengeschichte 1933–1940

=== Plays ===
- Der kerngesunde Kranke, (based on the play Der eingebildete Kranke), under the pseudonym Peter Pflug
- Der Ritt mit dem Henker, 1943

=== Translations ===
From Dutch: Paul Biegel: Ich will so gern anders sein. Verlag Freies Geistesleben, Stuttgart 2014, ISBN 978-3-8251-7807-9. First edition published by Herder, Freiburg 1969.
