= Nothgottes =

Monastery in Hesse, Germany

Coordinates: 50.0029°N 7.9258°E

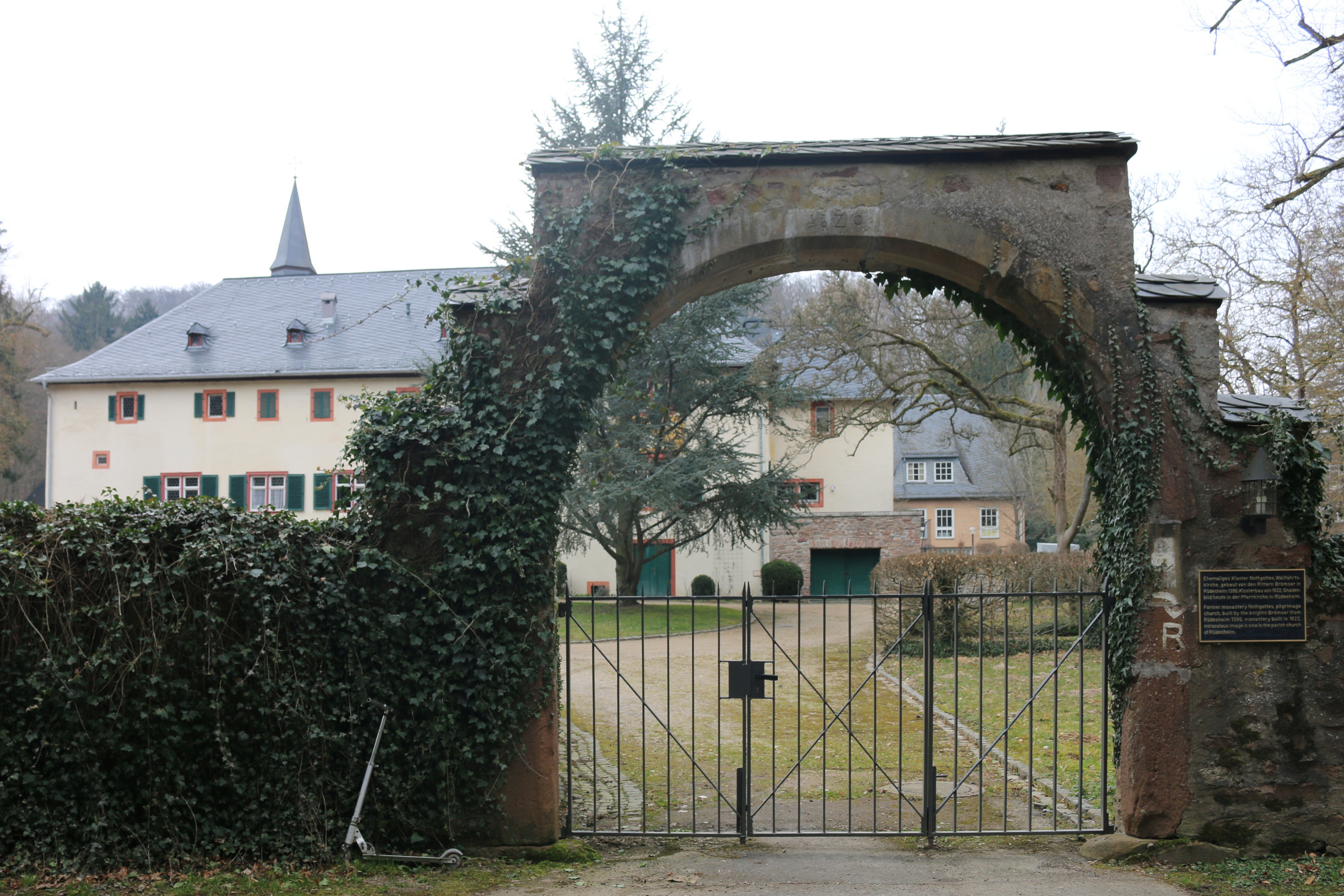
- Entrance to Nothgottes
- Nothgottes
- Location: Eibingen, Hesse, Germany
- Denomination: Catholic

Architecture
- Style: Gothic
- Groundbreaking: 15th century

Administration
- Diocese: Limburg

UNESCO World Heritage Site
- Official name: Upper Middle Rhine Valley
- Type: Cultural
- Criteria: ii, iv, v
- Designated: 2002
- Reference no.: 1066
- Region: Europe and North America

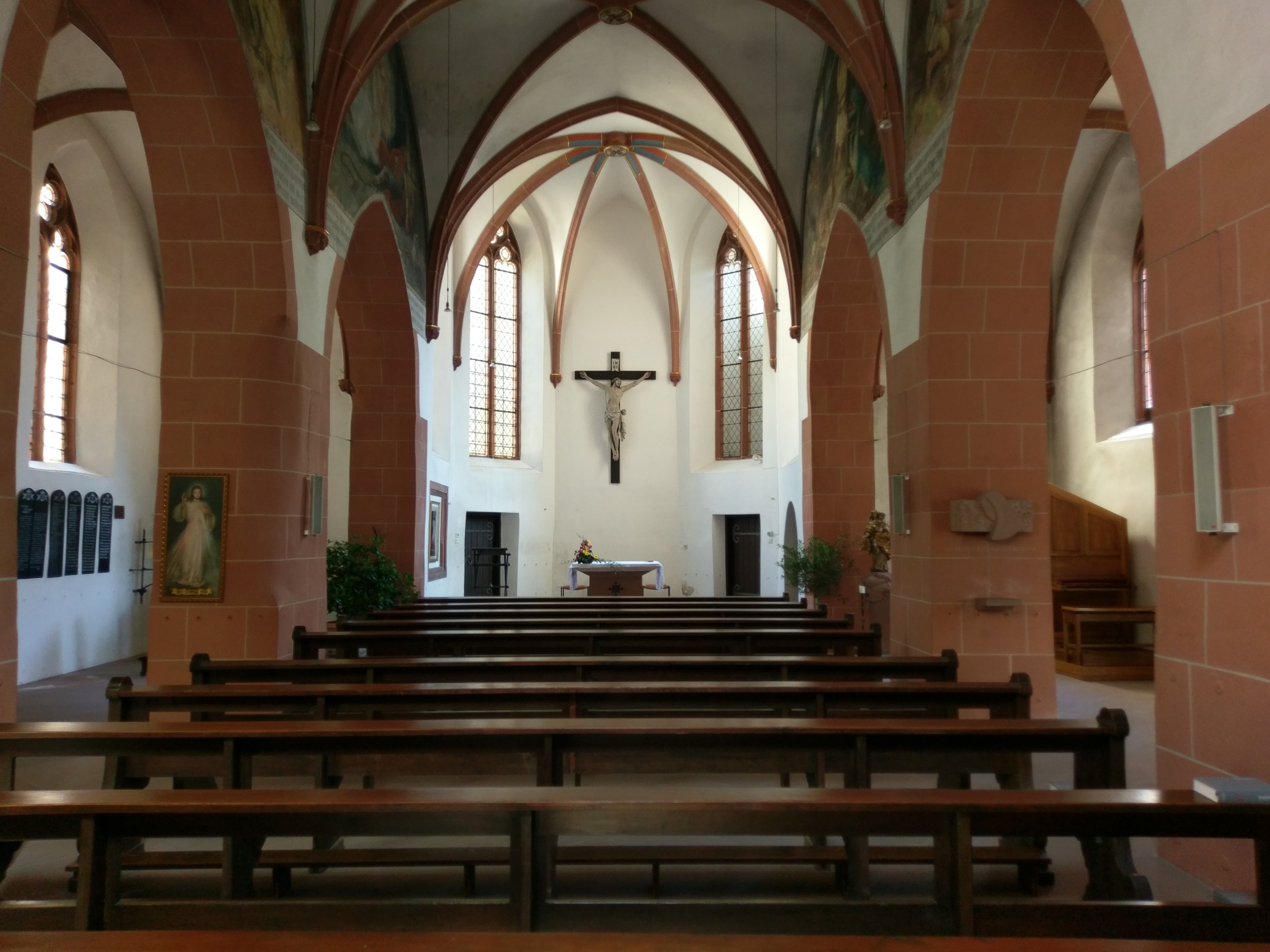
Interior of the church

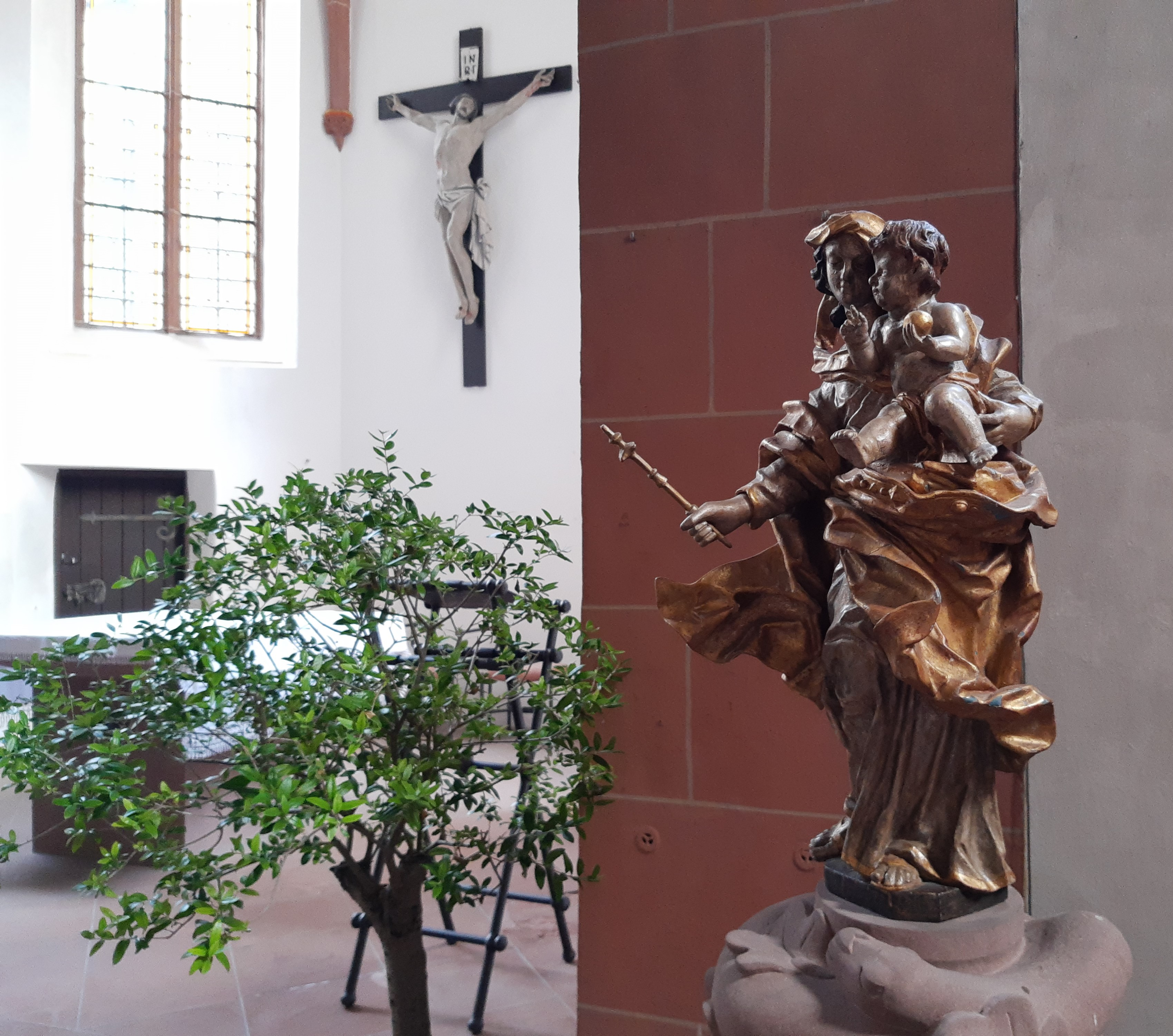
Madonna with Child statue

Nothgottes ([ˈnoːt.ɡɔt.əs], "Need of God") is a Cistercian monastery and a pilgrimage destination above Eibingen, in Rüdesheim am Rhein, Hesse, Germany. Pilgrimages to the location date back to the 14th century, and have continued to the present day, especially an annual pilgrimage from Kruft that began in 1674.

The present Gothic church was built in the 15th century, and later expanded. The site became a monastery of the Order of Friars Minor Capuchin. After monasteries were dissolved in 1813, it served different purposes, including as a monastery of the Poor Handmaids of Jesus Christ from 1932, a retreat location for the Diocese of Limburg from 1951, and a home for a Community of the Beatitudes from 2006. In 2013, it became a monastery again, inhabited by Cistercians from Vietnam.

== Location ==
Nothgottes is located in a wooded valley of the Rheingau Hills. The valley opens to the south towards Geisenheim. The Nothgottesstraße leads south from the monastery to the village of Windeck, which is close to Eibingen Abbey above the vineyards of Eibingen.

== History ==
The origin of the monastery dates back to the 14th century and pilgrims began visiting the site during that century. A chapel was built by Johann Brömser von Rüdesheim, and consecrated in 1390. According to legend he was given an image of Jesus sweating blood in the Agony in the Garden; one of Brömser's peasants had found the image when plowing, hearing the call "Noth Gottes" (Need of God) at the same time. According to other records, Brömser had promised to build three churches if he returned safely from the crusades, and Nothgottes was the last of these.

In the 15th century, the chapel was expanded to a pilgrimage church. From 1449, an indulgence was granted, making Nothgottes a popular pilgrimage site. A monastery of the Order of Friars Minor Capuchin was established by the Bishop of Mainz in 1620. A regular annual pilgrimage came from Kruft. It began in 1674 and is believed to have been undertaken for help with the plague, together with the promise to keep the pilgrimage. The pilgrims depart two days earlier by foot to reach their destination on the first Sunday in September. It was run until the German mediatisation, when monasteries were dissolved in 1813. The buildings were sold and transformed to a farm. In 1903, Emma Frohn acquired the property which was in disrepair, and the farm buildings. She married Anton Rust, and they transformed the place to an estate, converting the former church to a music hall used for concerts. It was also open for pilgrims.

After their death, the property was bought by the Diocese of Limburg. It was used by the Poor Handmaids of Jesus Christ (Arme Dienstmägde Jesu Christi) who took care of handicapped children there. They were expelled by the Nazis in 1937, who expropriated the buildings. After World War II, the church passed back into church ownership and the sisters returned, becoming a daughter monastery of Kloster Marienhausen near Aulhausen. The Diocese of Limburg used it as a venue for education and spiritual retreat from 1976 to 2006. From 2006 to 2012, it was used by the Community of the Beatitudes. From September 2013, it became a Cistercian monastery once again, housing a community from Châu Sơn Đơn Dương Abbey in Vietnam. They live in contemplation, though their services are open to the public.

In 2002, Nothgottes became part of the UNESCO World Heritage Site Rhine Gorge. The original of the venerated image was moved to the Rüdesheim museum.
