= Marienkirche, Aulhausen =

Marienkirche
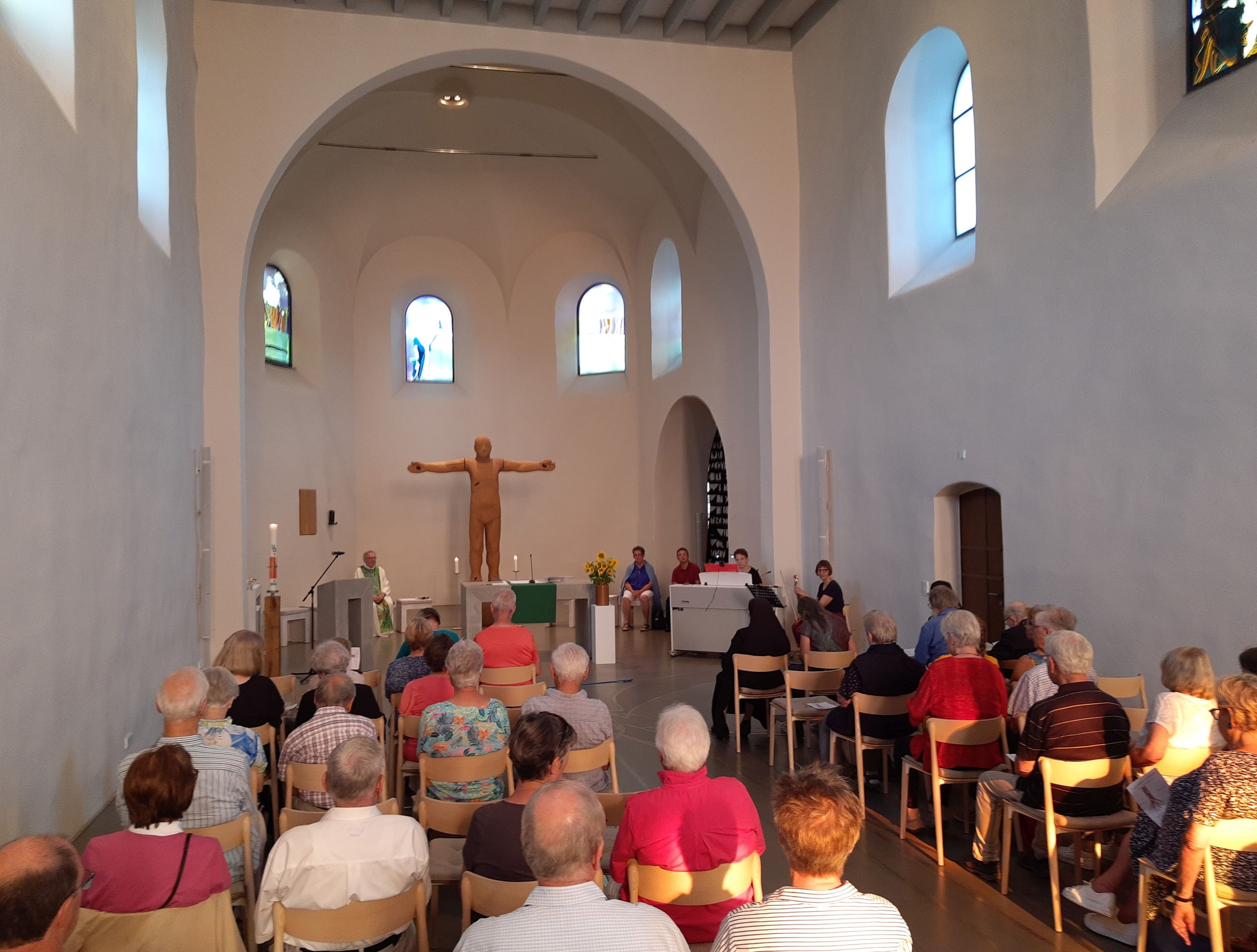
- Marienkirche
- 49°59′46″N 7°53′44″E
- Location: Aulhausen, Hesse
- Country: Germany
- Denomination: Catholic
- Website: www.marienkirche-aulhausen.de

History
- Dedication: St. Mary
- Consecrated: 1219

Architecture
- Architectural type: hall church
- Style: Gothic

The Marienkirche is a church, originally the abbey church of Kloster Marienhausen in Aulhausen, now Hesse, Germany. The monastery of Cistercian nuns was founded before 1189 and was dissolved in 1810. The small Gothic church, dedicated to Mary, is now part of the St. Vincenzstift, an institution for handicapped inhabitants. The church was restored from 2010, with all artwork designed by handicapped artists. The church serves for a monthly service of regional importance.

== History ==
The Cistercian monastery for nuns can be traced back to 1189, when it was subordinated to Eberbach Abbey.

In 1219 the abbey church was consecrated by the archbishop of Mainz, Siegfried II. It was the oldest of three Cistercian, the others being Kloster Tiefenthal and Kloster Gottesthal. The name Marienhausen was established in the second half of the 16th century. In February 1811, the monastery was dissolved by Frederick Augustus, Duke of Nassau.

It was sold to Hans Carl von Zwierlein from Geisenheim. In 1888, the Diocese of Limburg acquired the building. The following year they were used by an institution of the diocese, Zum Heiligen Josef, of the Poor Handmaids of Jesus Christ, serving as a place of education for up to 200 children and youth. The buildings were badly damaged by fire in 1915, but restored by 1925. The Salesians of Don Bosco founded a monastery and took over the educational facility, where 40 children were educated until 1991.

== Presence ==
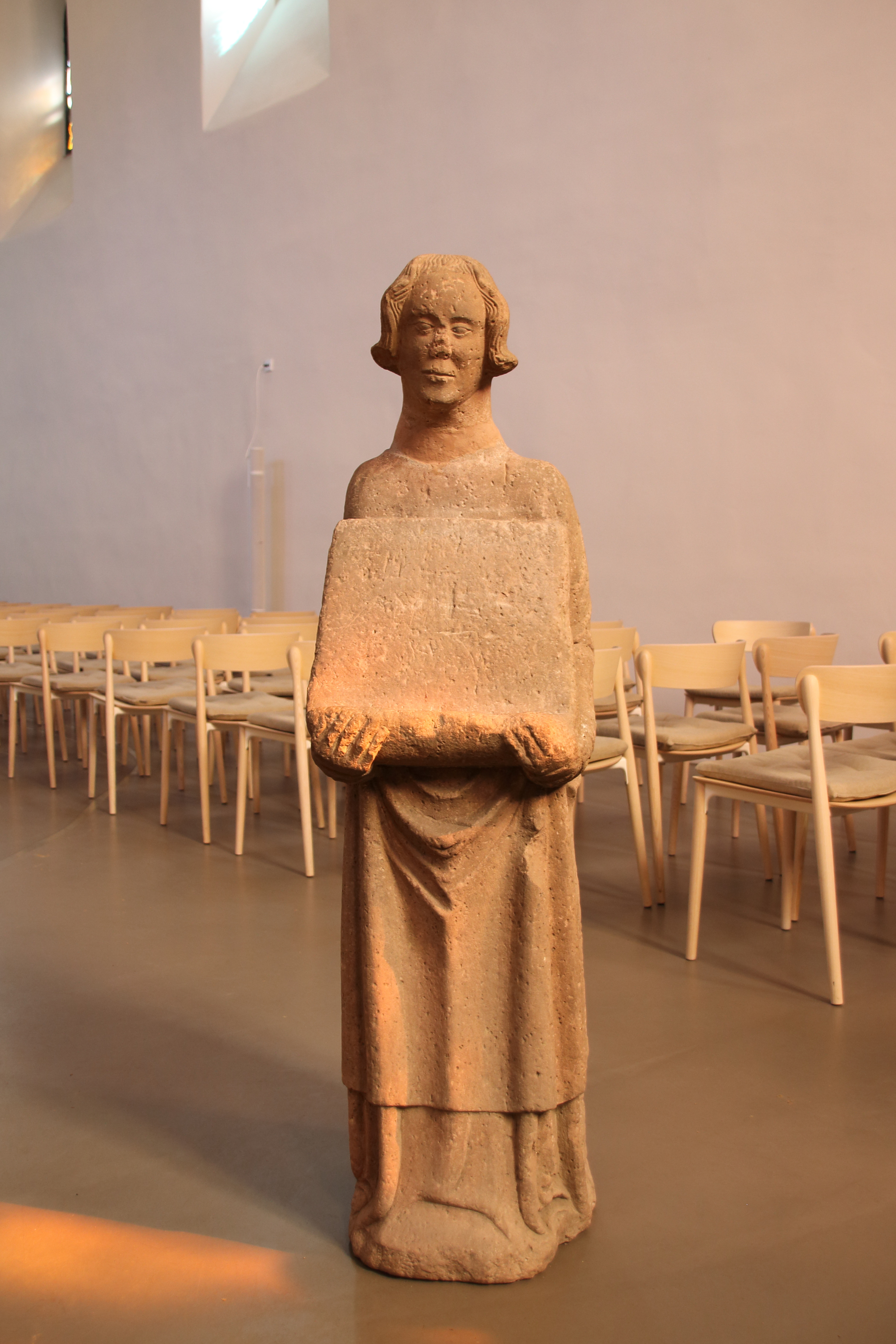
Atzmann Pultträger Marienkirche Marienhausen Rüdesheim Aulhausen

In 1991, the St. Vincenzstift took over and established a Sonderpädagogisches Zentrum and the Jugendhilfe Marienhausen.

In 2010, the Marienkirche was restored. The new artwork was designed by Atelier Goldstein of the Lebenshilfe from Frankfurt by handicapped artists. It was reopened in June 2014. On this occasion, a medieval Pultträger was restored from the museum in Limburg to the Marienkirche.
