= Rüdesheim am Rhein =

Rüdesheim Rüdesheim am Rhein
- Town
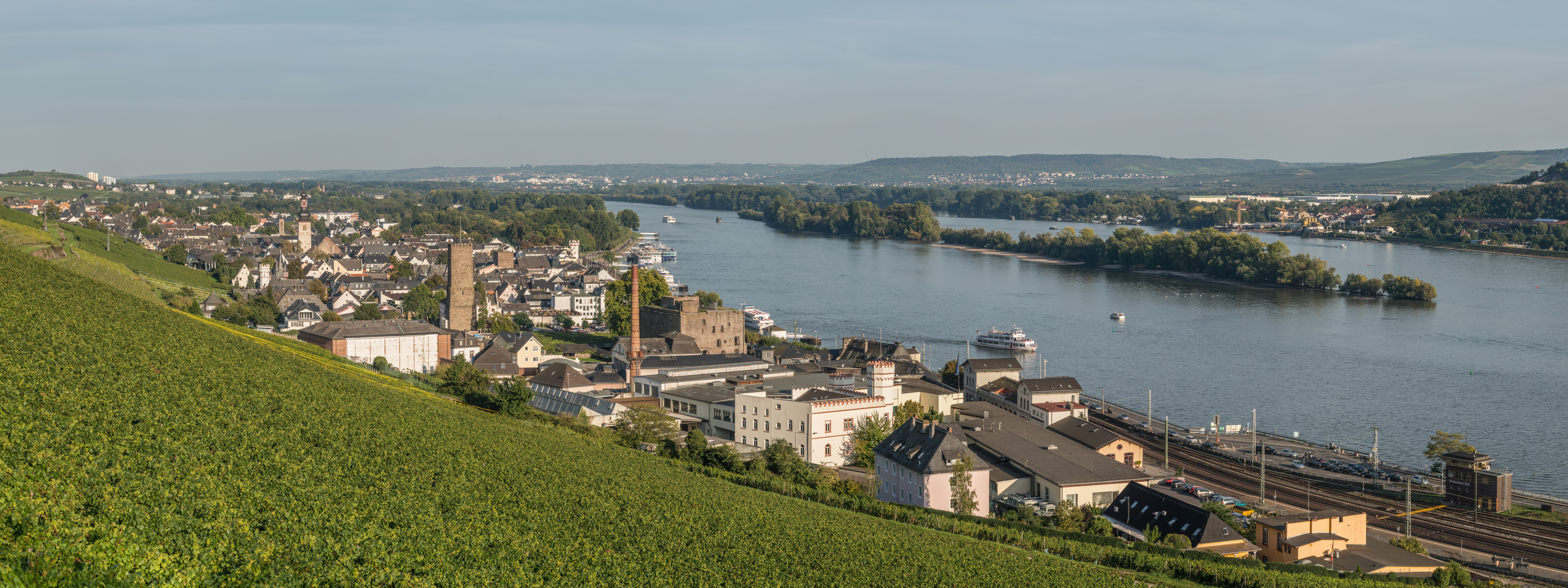
- Rüdesheim seen from nearby vineyards

- Flag Coat of arms

- Location of Rüdesheim within Rheingau-Taunus-Kreis district
- Interactive map of Rüdesheim
- Location within Germany Location within Hesse
- Coordinates: 49°59′0″N 07°55′50″E
- Country: Germany
- State: Hesse
- Admin. region: Darmstadt
- District: Rheingau-Taunus-Kreis
- Subdivisions: 5 districts

Government
  - Mayor (2019–25): Klaus Zapp (Ind.)

Area
  - Total: 51.41 km^{2} (19.85 sq mi)
- Elevation: 186 m (610 ft)

Population (2025-12-31)
  - Total: 9,874
  - Density: 192.1/km^{2} (497.4/sq mi)
- Time zone: UTC+01:00 (CET)
  - Summer (DST): UTC+02:00 (CEST)
- Postal codes: 65385
- Dialling codes: 06722
- Vehicle registration: RÜD, SWA
- Website: www.stadt-ruedesheim.de

Rüdesheim am Rhein (German pronunciation: [ˈʁyːdəshaɪm ʔam ˈʁaɪn], lit. 'Rüdesheim on the Rhine') is a German winemaking town in the Rhine Gorge, and part of the UNESCO World Heritage Site in this region. It lies in the Rheingau-Taunus-Kreis district in the Regierungsbezirk of Darmstadt, Hessen. Known as Rüdesheim, it is officially Rüdesheim am Rhein, to distinguish it from Rüdesheim an der Nahe. It is a major tourist attraction, especially for foreign visitors.

== Geography ==
=== Location ===
Rüdesheim lies at the foot of the Niederwald on the Rhine's right bank in the Rheingau wine region. The town belongs to the Frankfurt Rhine Main Region and to the World Heritage Site Rhine Gorge. It has a picturesque Old Town, located in the Rheingau landscape celebrated in Rhine romanticism.

=== Territorial structure ===
Rüdesheim am Rhein as a municipality consists of five quarters:

- Rüdesheim am Rhein (initial part and center)
- Eibingen including Windeck, Eibingen Abbey and Nothgottes
- Assmannshausen
- Aulhausen including the former Marienhausen Abbey and the St. Vincenzstift
- Presberg

Assmannshausen, Aulhausen and Presberg have the status of an Ortsbezirk. Central Rüdesheim and Eibingen form a combined fourth Ortsbezirk.

=== Neighbouring communities ===
Rüdesheim borders in the north and north-west on the town of Lorch, in the east on the town of Geisenheim. On the left bank of the Rhine in Rhineland-Palatinate, Rüdesheim faces the town of Bingen to the south, and the villages of Weiler and Trechtingshausen to the south-west. Rüdesheim is connected with the left Rhine bank by a ferry for pedestrians and one for cars.

== History ==
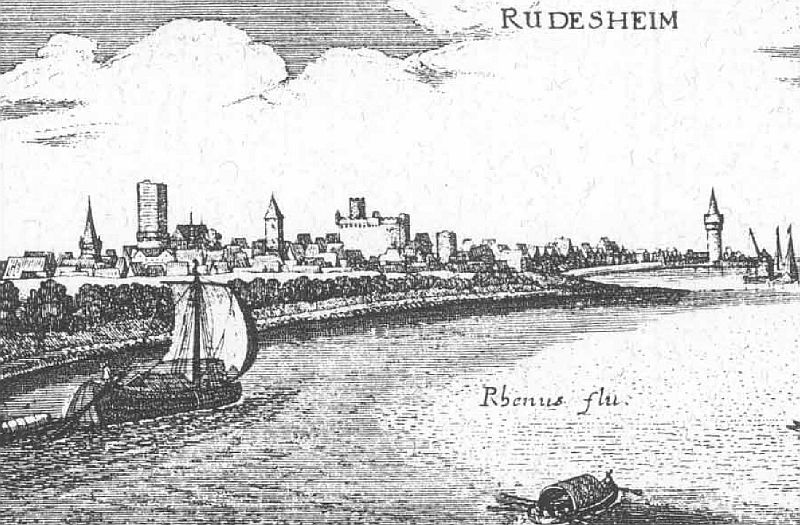
Rüdesheim – extract from the Topographia Hassiae by Matthäus Merian the Younger, 1655

The area was settled first by the Celts, then after the turn of the Christian Era by Ubii and later by Mattiaci. In the first century, the Romans pushed forth to the Taunus. In Bingen they built a castrum, and on the other side, near what is now Rüdesheim, lay a bridgehead on the way to the Limes.

The Romans were followed by the Alamanni, and during the Migration Period the Franks migrated into the region. Archaeological finds of glass from this time suggest that there was already winegrowing in Rüdesheim. The town's origin as a Frankish Haufendorf (roughly: "clump village") can still be seen on today's town maps.

Rüdesheim was first mentioned in a document in 1074. Its livelihood came mainly from winegrowing and shipping, particularly timber rafting.

On 1 January 1818, Rüdesheim received town rights. After Prussia annexed the Duchy of Nassau in 1867 and divided the area into districts (Kreise), Rüdesheim became a district seat in the newly founded Rheingaukreis. It held this status 110 years until 1977, when in the course of municipal reform in Hesse the districts of the Rheingaukreis and the Untertaunuskreis were merged into the new Rheingau-Taunus-Kreis, and Rüdesheim had to yield the district seat to Bad Schwalbach.

In 1877, the first foundation stone was laid for the Niederwalddenkmal, a patriotic monument above the vineyards which would be finished in 1883. It attracted many tourists who could reach it on a cog railway. Today, a gondola lift brings visitors up to the monument. Tourism has more and more replaced shipping as a source of income.

In 1939, under the secrecy that held sway at the time, the formerly self-governing community of Eibingen was forcibly amalgamated with the town by the National Socialists, against the community inhabitants' will. In 1977, within the framework of municipal reform, Assmannshausen, Aulhausen and Presberg were incorporated into Rüdesheim as Ortsbezirke.

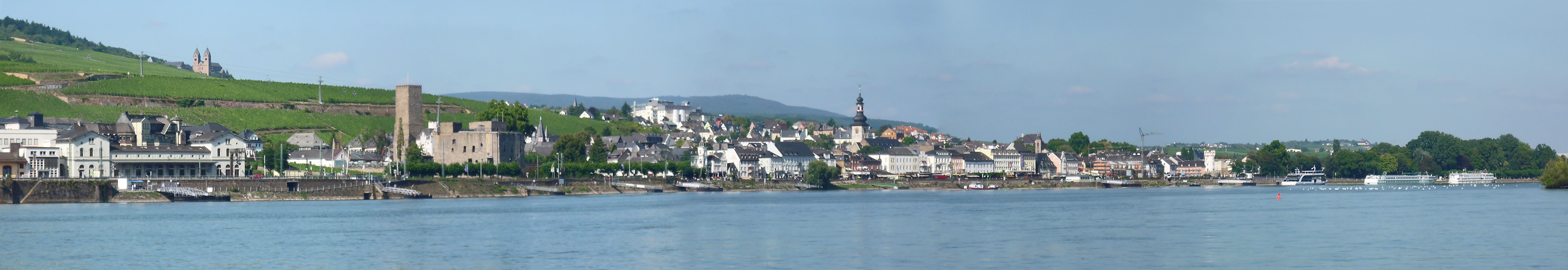
Rüdesheim, seen from the Rhine

== Politics ==
=== Town council ===
The municipal election for the town council (German: Stadtverordnetenversammlung) was held on 6 March 2016 and yielded the following results, compared to previous elections:

Parties	2016		2011		2006		2001	
Parties	%	Seats	%	Seats	%	Seats	%	Seats
CDU	42,3	13	41,2	13	44,8	14	52,0	19
WIR	14,2	4	21,4	7	23,6	7	—	—
SPD	12,3	4	19,9	6	23,4	7	32,3	12
GfR	27,3	9	—	—	—	—	—	—
FDP	3,9	1	4,1	1	3,0	1	15,7	6
Offene Grüne Liste	—	—	13,4	4	5,1	2	—	—
Total	100,0	31	100,0	31	100,0	31	100,0	37
Voters in %	45,8		47,7		46,4		49,7	

=== Town partnerships ===
- Meursault, Côte-d'Or, France
- Juliénas, Rhône, France (twinned with quarter Assmannshausen)
- Oingt, Rhône, France (twinned with quarter Presberg)
- Mezőkövesd, Borsod-Abaúj-Zemplén County, Hungary
- Swanage, Dorset, England, UK

== Culture and sightseeing ==
=== Museums ===
- Siegfrieds Mechanisches Musikkabinett, a museum for mechanical musical instruments. On an exhibition area of over 400 m^{2}, the museum provides information about the history of self-playing music and its instruments. Also known as Brömserhof, formerly the home of Heinrich Brömser von Rüdesheim (born ca. 1601, died 1668).
- Mittelalterliches Foltermuseum ("Mediaeval torture museum"), with many instruments of torture
- Asbach Distillery, brandy museum illustrating the history of Asbach Uralt production
- Rheingauer Weinmuseum Brömserburg, about the area's 1000-year winegrowing history, located in castle Brömserburg.

=== Notable sites ===
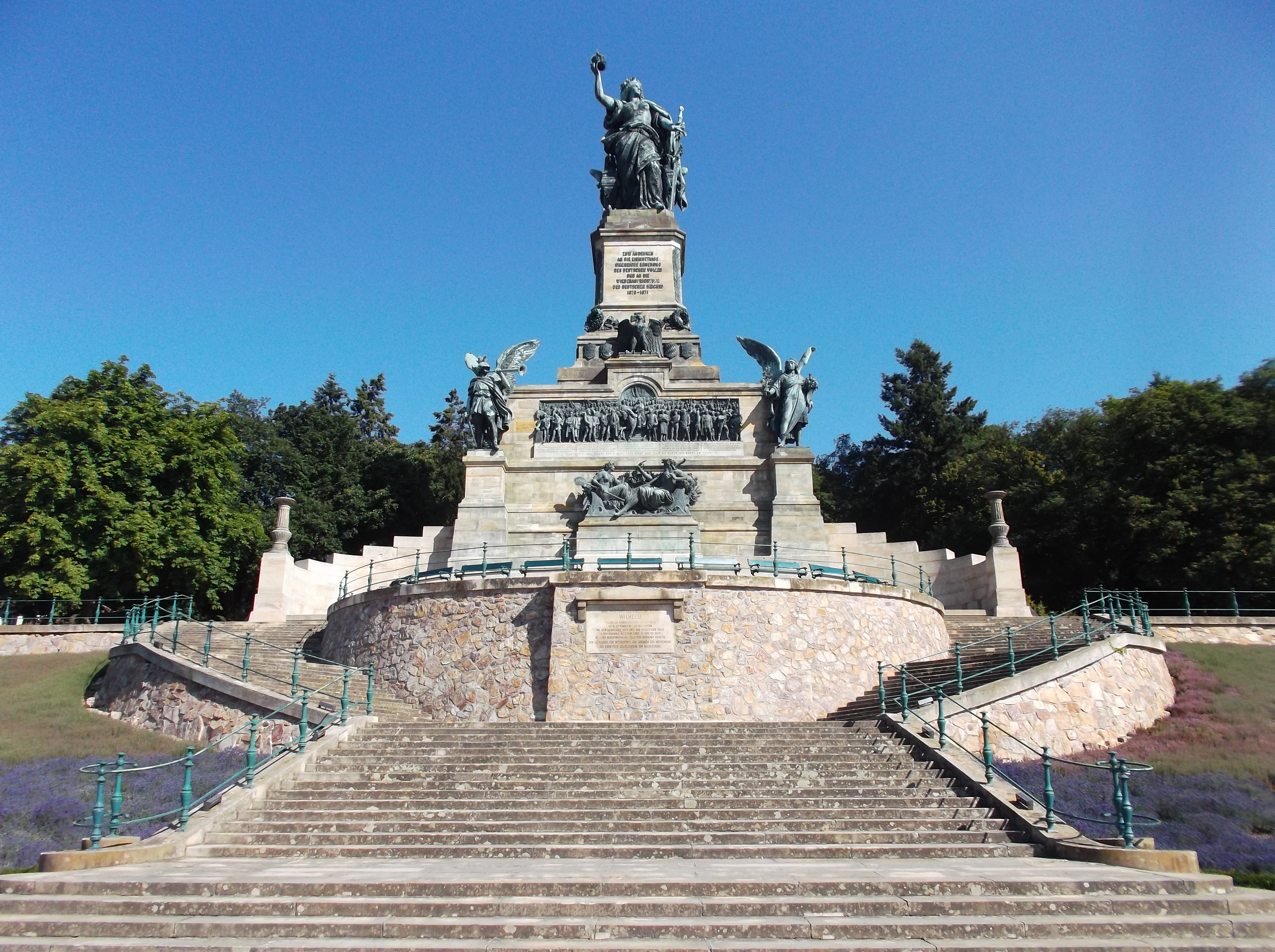
Niederwalddenkmal in 2015

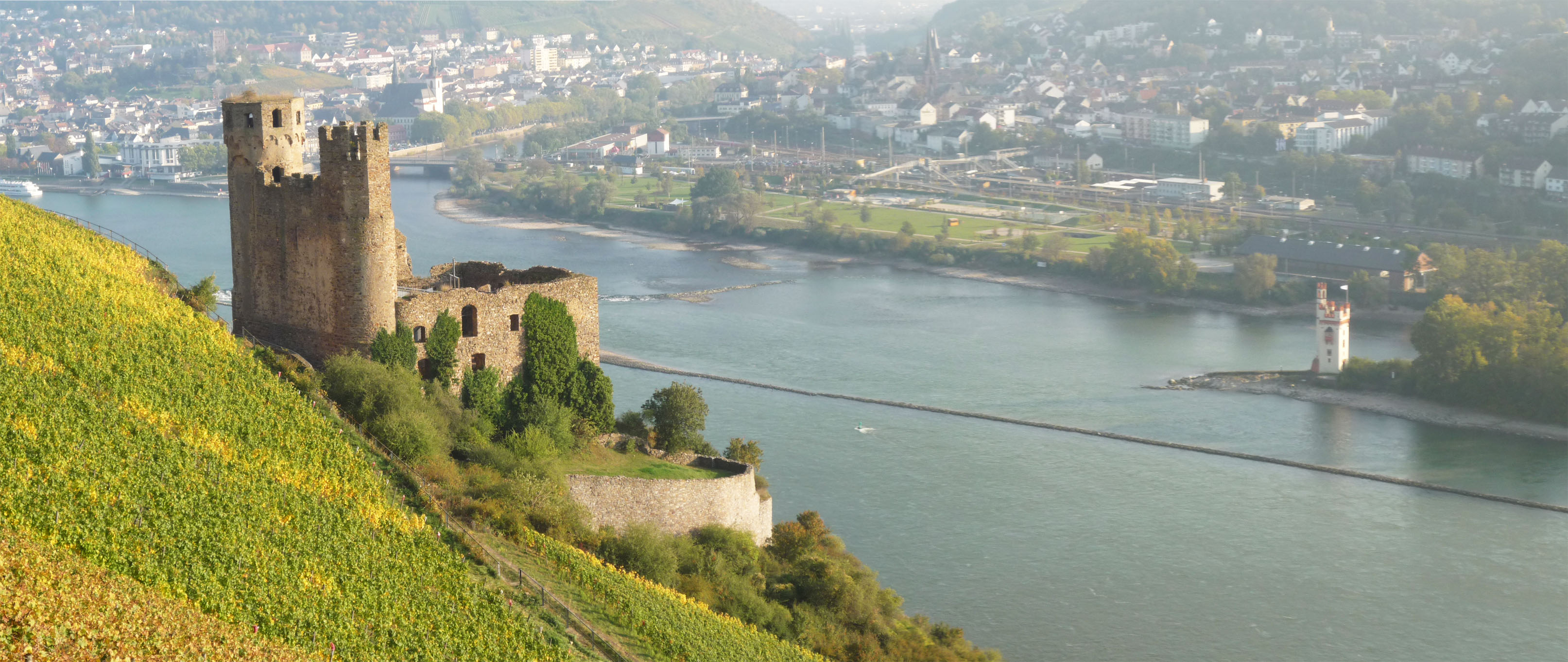
Ruined castle Ehrenfels

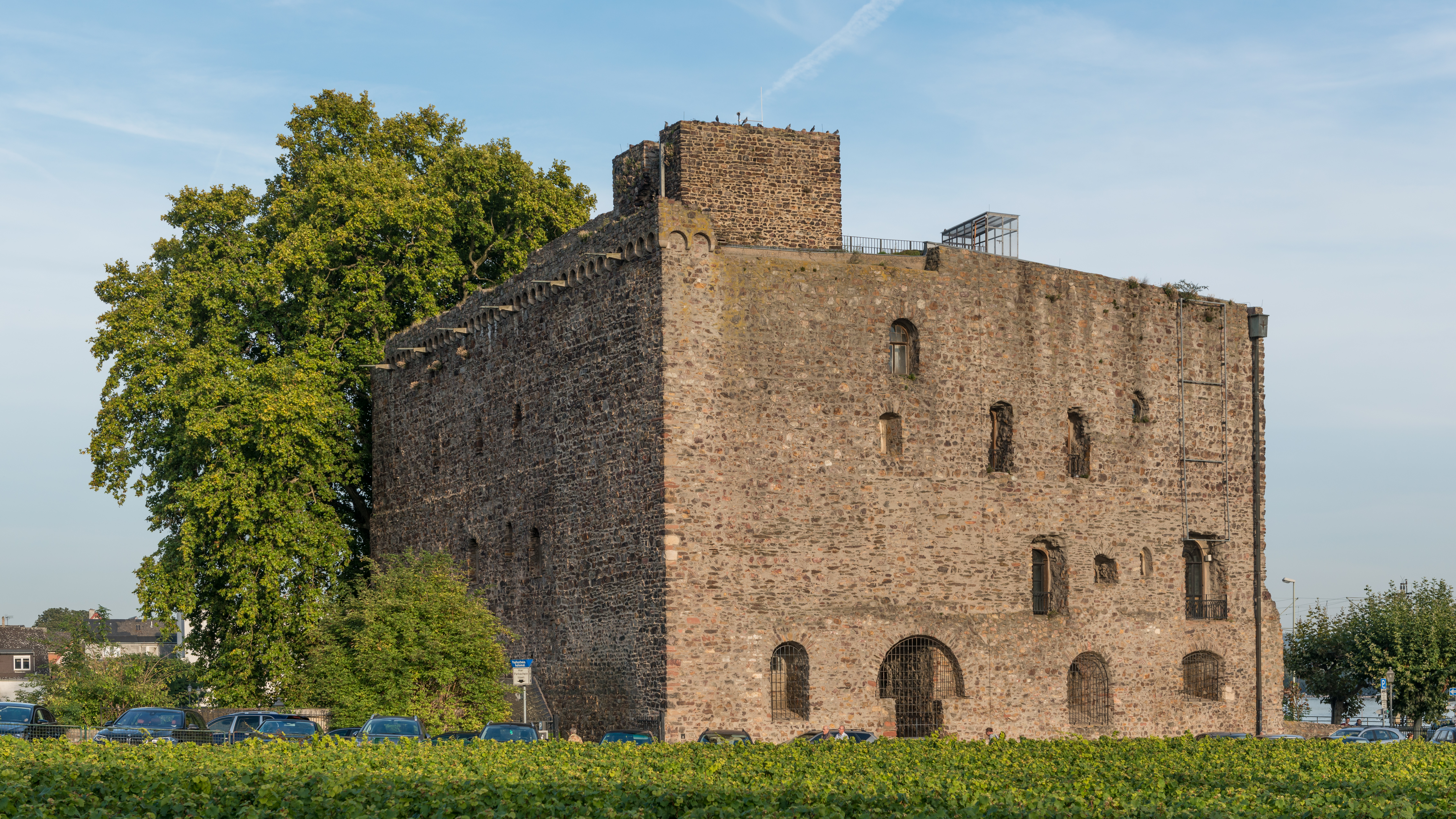
Brömserburg

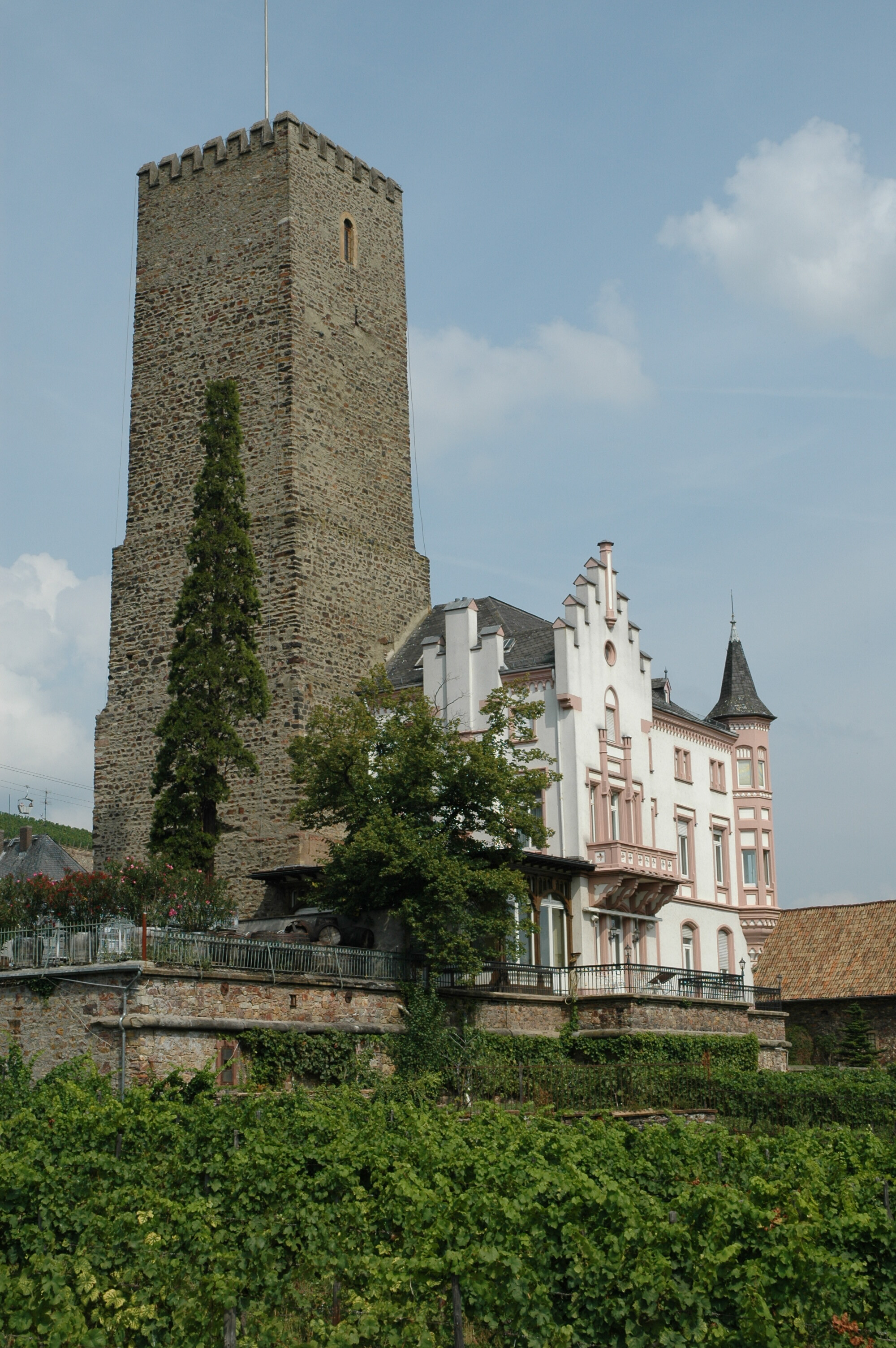
Boosenburg

- Niederwalddenkmal, a patriotic monument finished in 1883
- Landschaftspark Niederwald, a park from the 18th century
- Drosselgasse is a lane in the heart of Rüdesheim's Old Town. Live band entertainment, brass instruments and dance music all day and all night during the summer in the many wine taverns and open-air garden taverns along the 144-metre-long narrow cobblestone pedestrian street. Boat owners used the 15th-century Drosselgasse to move items from the river to homes in the town
- St. Jakobus, the parish church from the 15th century, rebuilt after World War II
- Burg Ehrenfels, a ruined castle in the vineyards
- Brömserburg, the oldest castle in the Rhine Gorge World Heritage Site. It was built in the 10th century on the site of a Roman fortification. From the 10th to the 13th century it was owned by the Archbishop of Mainz. The old fortress was converted into a residence in the 12th century. It then passed into the control of the Knights of Rüdesheim. A branch of these knights was the Brömser. It was retaken by Archbishop Werner II von Eppenstein in 1281. The castle withstood a number of attacks. In 1640, during the Thirty Years' War, the top of the tower was destroyed by French troops under the command of Henri II d'Orléans, duc de Longueville. The Archbishopric sold it in 1803 and it has had several owners since then. The town of Rüdesheim bought the castle in 1941. The site includes a modern-day wine museum.
- Boosenburg, a castle from the 12th century with a preserved bergfried and a Gothic revival villa which serves as a concert venue
- Eibingen Abbey, founded by Hildegard of Bingen, above Eibingen
- Remains of the Hindenburgbrücke, a bridge destroyed in the Second World War

=== Hiking trails ===
The Rheinsteig from Wiesbaden to Bonn leads through Rüdesheim's municipal area by both the Eibingen Abbey and the Niederwalddenkmal. Another trail is the Riesling-Route. It leads along the Rhine and through Rüdesheim's vineyards on the way to Wiesbaden.

=== Tradition ===
A well known tradition is the Weinkönigin ("Wine Queen") with her princesses. Each year in the summertime, the Rüdesheim wine festival is held, whose highlights include the Wine Queen's and the princesses' coronation. They represent the town of Rüdesheim and its wine in other communities and winegrowing areas.

In the deeds held by the Counts of Katzenelnbogen, vineyards are already found in the Rüdesheim area in 1399: auf dem Berge ("on the mountain"), bei dem Morgen Marschalls ("near Marshal's acre") and unterhalb Eibingen am Fluß ("beneath Eibingen at the river").

Rüdesheim lies in the north-west corner of the German wine-producing region Rheingau. Riesling grapes are the main type grown in this area, producing mainly high-quality white wines.

=== Regular events ===
- Magic-Bike-Rüdesheim (as a rule on Corpus Christi weekend)
- Tal total yearly on the last Saturday in June. On this day, Bundesstraße 42 between Rüdesheim and Koblenz on the Rhine's right bank and Bundesstraße 9 on the left between Bingen and Koblenz are closed to motorized traffic and left free for cyclists and skaters.
- Rheingau Musik Festival, usually a summer concert in the Eibingen Abbey and/or in the church St. Jakobus
- Rhein in Flammen (fireworks festival) on the first Saturday in July
- World Heritage celebration at the Niederwalddenkmal (since 2003 usually in late July on a Friday and Saturday)
- Weinfest (wine festival third weekend in August)
- Gallustag (Saint Galls day), festival to honour the grape harvest, medieval market and event
- Tage des Federweißen (year's last wine festival) late October, early November
- Weihnachtsmarkt der Nationen ("Christmas Market of the Nations") 120 stalls, open daily from late November until Christmas

== Transport ==
Rüdesheim (Rhein) station is on the East Rhine Railway and is served by trains running at least hourly during the day to Frankfurt and Koblenz.

== Education ==
- Hildegardisschule (Realschule and primary school spread between two buildings)
- Nikolausschule (Assmannshausen primary school)
- Grundschule Presberg (primary school)

== Notable people ==
The town's medieval noble family called itself "von Rüdesheim". One of its members was Rudolf of Rüdesheim (1402–1482), papal legate and since 1468 Prince-Bishop of Breslau.

=== Born in Rüdesheim ===
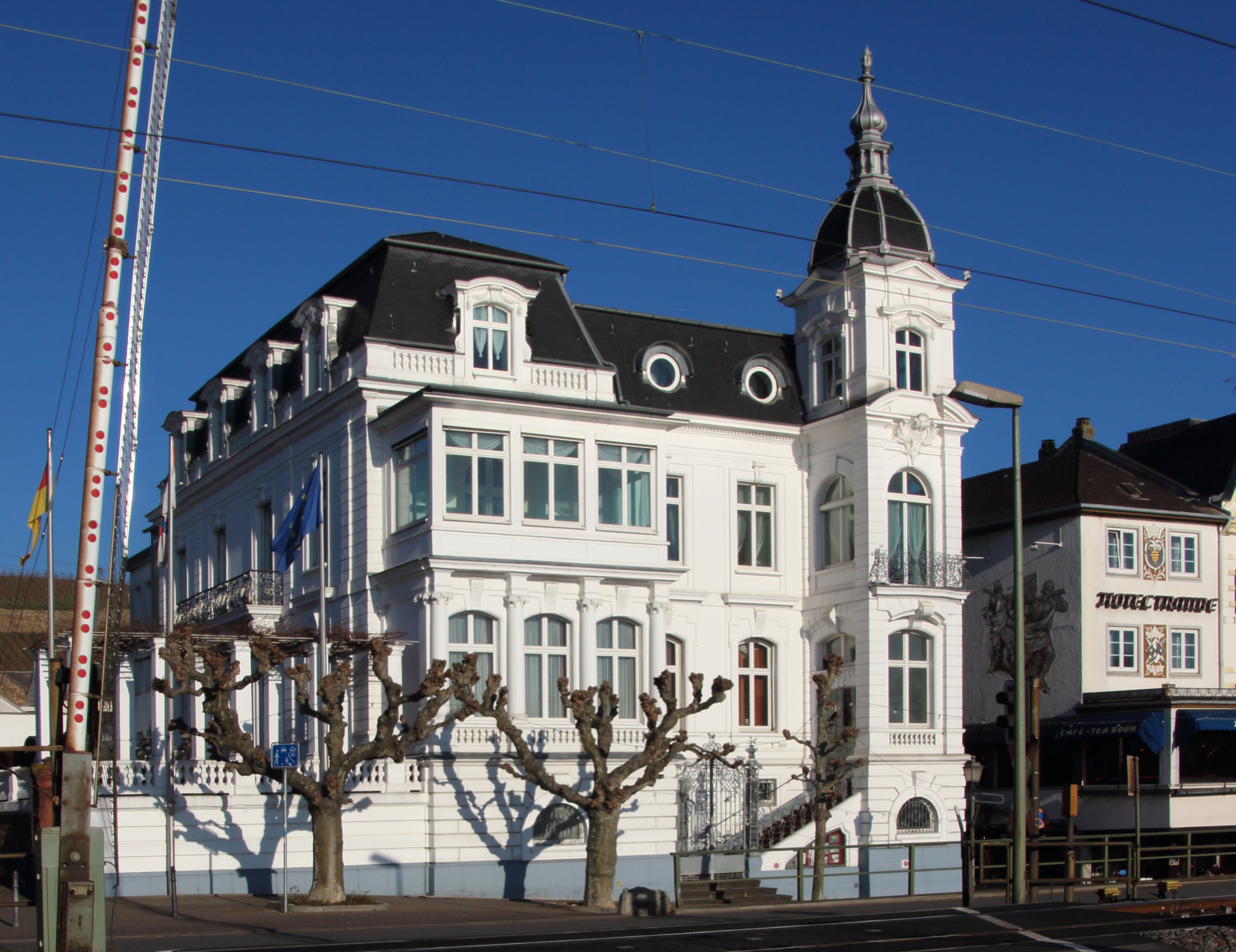
Villa Sturm in front of the Rhine

- Jacob Fidelis Ackermann (1765–1815), physician
- Theodor Friedrich Ludwig Dilthey (6 February 1825 – 22 March 1892), businessman: He took over his father's wine wholesaling business, Dilthey-Sahl & Co. in Rüdesheim, in 1852 and undertook many business trips to England and Russia to further German wine and sekt exports. In 1867 he was cofounder and first president of the Wiesbaden chamber of commerce. He composed many poems in praise of wine.
- Georg Geiling (1 June 1863 – 1947), master cooper: Geiling studied after his apprenticeship as a cooper in Reims and Épernay and in 1890 founded the sekt cellar "Georges Geiling & Cie." in Reims. In 1894, he settled in Bacharach, where in 1919 he built up his own sparkling wine factory.
- Antonius Wallenstein (20 January 1890 – 28 December 1964 on the Abtsberg near Gengenbach in Baden), Catholic priest of a religious order, spiritual writer. Works (selection): Das Problem der Willensfreiheit unter besonderer Hervorkehrung der methodischen Gesichtspunkte, in: PhJ 36 (1923), 1–24 (excerpts from his dissertation); Katechismus der christlichen Vollkommenheit, Freiburg 1930 (2nd ed. 1936); Kindheit und Jugend als Erziehungsaufgabe, Freiburg 1951; Klarheit über Gott, Leutesdorf 1959.
- Hermann Asbach (18 March 1894 – unknown), businessman: one of Hugo Asbach's three sons and later owner of the firm Asbach (Asbach Uralt, brandy).
- Rudolf Krämer-Badoni (1913–1989), writer and publicist.
- Karl Heinz Hock (born 1930), publicist and journalist.
- Kurt W. Stasiak (born 1952), US Benedictine monk and Archabbot
- Johannes Schild (born 1965), composer and conductor as well as professor at the Cologne University of Music.
- Jennifer Braun (born 1991), pop/rock singer, runner-up of Unser Star für Oslo 2010.

=== Other people linked with the town ===
- The composer Johannes Brahms (1833–1897) was repeatedly a guest at the family Beckerath's house in Rüdesheim (Oberstraße/Schmidstraße, today Sekthaus Solter) between 1874 and 1895. In 1883 in Wiesbaden he wrote the Symphony No. 3 in F major, Op. 90. At this time he also took part in the festive unveiling of the Niederwalddenkmal in Rüdesheim. In the rooms of the former Villa Sturm on Rheinstraße, the yearly Rüdesheimer Brahms-Tage take place in the composer's memory.
- Bernhard Hopffer (7 August 1840 in Berlin – 20 August 1877 at the Niederwald hunting palace near Rüdesheim) studied music at the Kullak'sches Conservatorium and lived as a composer in Berlin. His last years he lived, owing to his lung illness, in various spas. He wrote symphonies, chamber music, songs – among others, Lockung, Op. 22/1 (1872) after Joseph von Eichendorff – as well as an opera, Frithjof, which was first produced in Berlin in 1871.
- Hans Otto Jung (1920–2009) and his wife Ursula Jung, sponsors of musical institutions such as a chamber music series and "Brahmstage" in Rüdesheim, "Die Kammermusik" in Wiesbaden (he was president of the association since 1976), Dr. Hoch's Konservatorium and the Hochschule für Musik und Darstellende Kunst Frankfurt am Main, founding members of the Rheingau Musik Festival.
- The German violinist Gerhard Taschner (1922–1976) lived from 1946 to 1950 in the house of the art-minded winemaker Carl Jung in Rüdesheim. In the piano trio with Ludwig Hoelscher and the pianist Walter Gieseking, he gave a series of private concerts here.

== See also ==
- Rheinsteig
- Rüdesheimer Kaffee, a local drink made with coffee and Asbach Uralt, German Brandy.
