= Kurt Weigel =

German Catholic priest and hymn writer (born 1950)

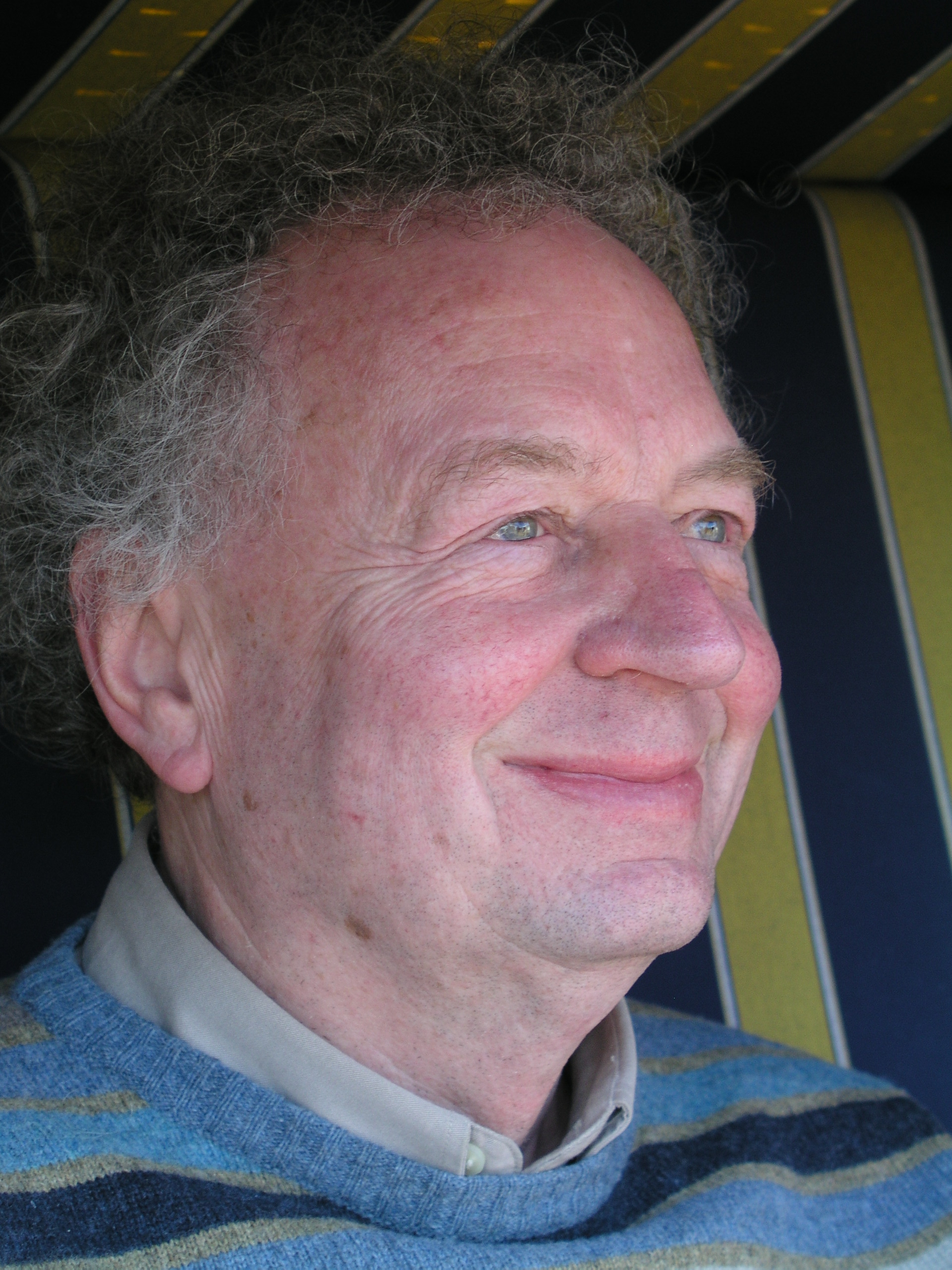
- Weigel in 2013
- Born: 19 March 1950 (age 76); Cloppenburg, Germany
- Occupation: Priest

Ecclesiastical career
- Church: Catholic
- Ordained: 1956

Kurt Weigel (born 19 March 1950) is a German Catholic priest, writer and hymn writer. He worked for decades on the island and tourist destination of Wangerooge. After retirement there in 2016, he has worked at the St. Vincenzstift, Aulhausen, where he initiated monthly alternative services called Tatort-Gottesdienst.

== Life and career ==
Weigel was born in Cloppenburg on 19 March 1950. After his consecration as a priest at the Münster Cathedral he was vicar first of St. Martinus in Greven from 1976 to 1980, then of St. Willehad on the island of Wangerooge until 1985. He was then spiritual at the seminary of Limburg an der Lahn. In 1994 he returned to Wangerooge as parish priest.

The parish has around 200 local members but many more tourists during vacations. During these period, Weigel invited a team of 15 to twenty people to live in his house and assist in a broad program to offer spiritual guidance.

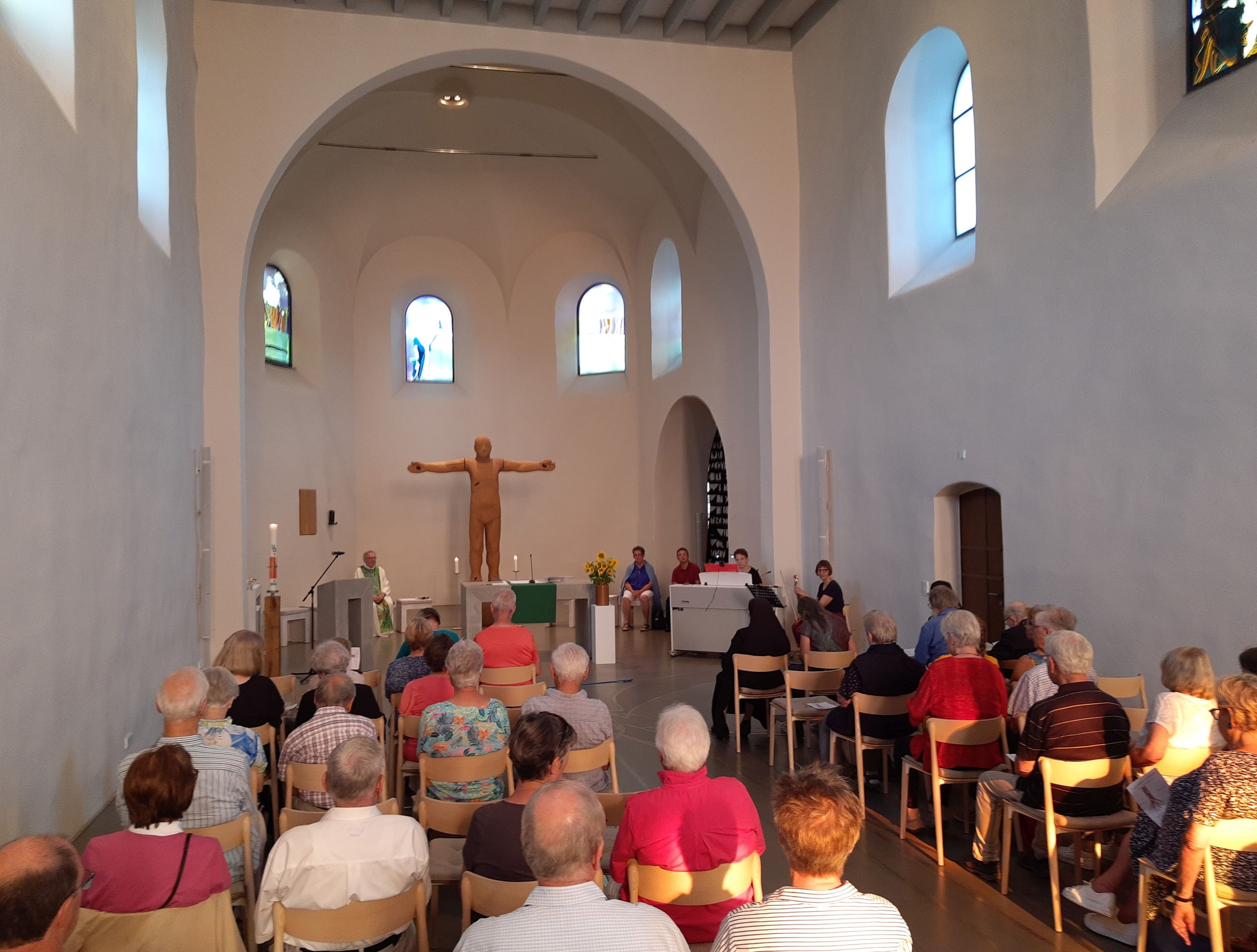
Tatort-Gottesdienst Marienkirche, 1 September 2024, with Franz Kamphaus attending

Weigel retired on 5 April 2015 and took residence at the St. Vincenzstift, Aulhausen, serving as a priest. The church, originally a Romanesque abbey church, was decorated by artists with disabilities. The church was reopened after the installation of their art, with Weigel as the designated priest, in 2016 by Bishop Franz Kamphaus, a resident of the institution. Weigel initiated a regular themed Tatort-Gottesdienst at the Marienkirche on the first Sunday of each month. These services include singing with instruments such as violins, flute and keyboard, including rounds, and texts from the Bible and from literature and poetry. Music is often provided by groups such as the vocal ensemble Vocapella from Limburg; sometimes the musicians offer a concert before the service.

Weigel is known as the author of books and for appearances on radio and television. Some of his texts, including hymns and sermons, have been published on CDs.

He received the 2007 Comenius-Preis for his engagement as a pedagogue and for the community.

== Works ==
- Es gibt Zeiten, da möchte ich auf einer Insel wohnen. Aschendorff-Verlag, 2001.
- Heilende Nähe. Lahn Verlag, Limburg, ISBN 3784026648 (with Tisa von der Schulenburg).
- Gebete – nicht nur für den Urlaub. 1988.
- Mit ausgestreckten Händen. 44 Karten mit Gebeten und Zeichnungen von Kurt Weigel. Verlag Terwelp.
