= Boosenburg =

Castle in Hesse, Germany

- Rüdesheim am Rhein
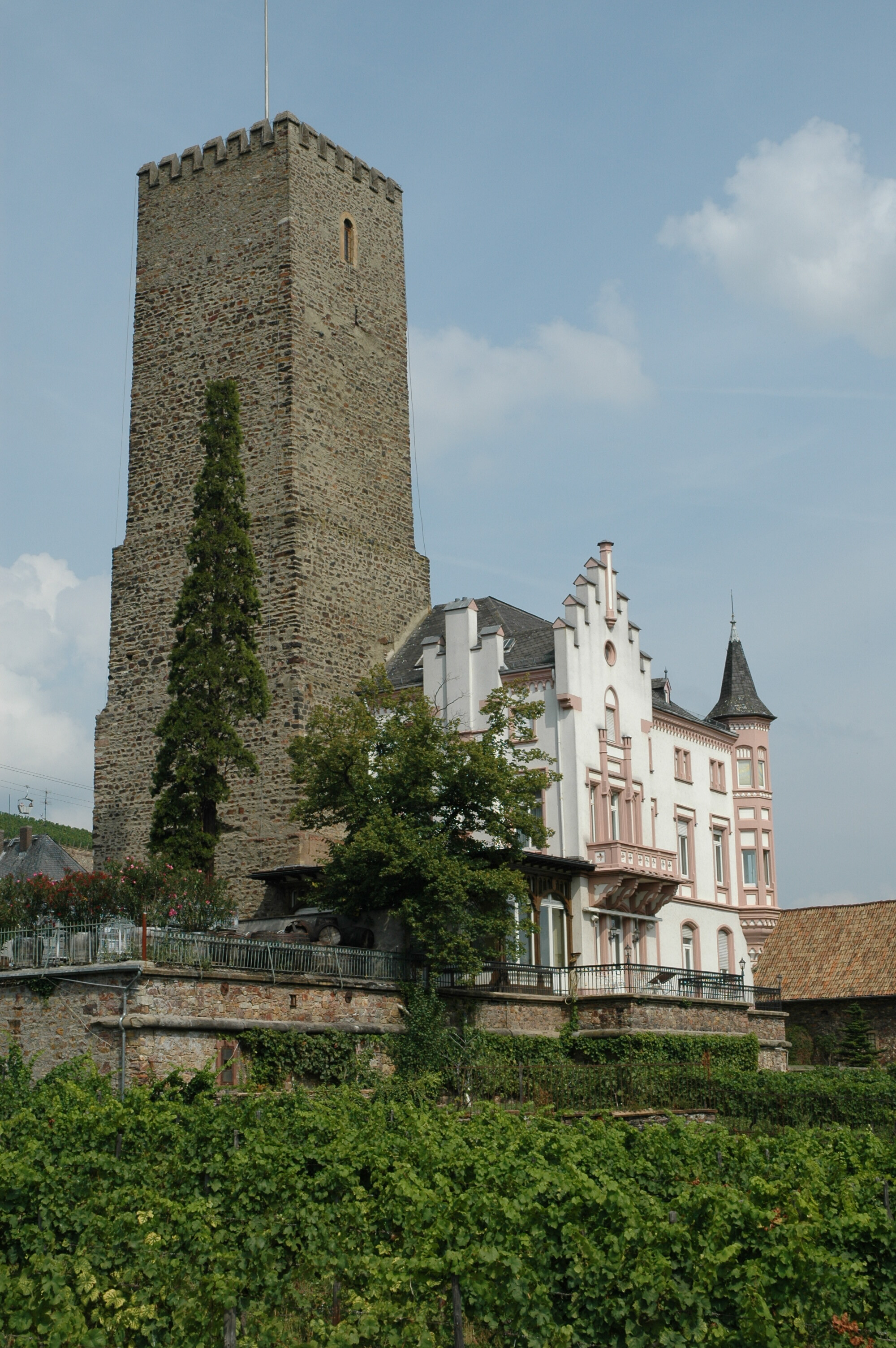
- The castle from the southwest

Site information
- Type: lowland castle
- Code: DE-HE
- Condition: partly preserved

Location
- Coordinates: 49°58′42″N 7°55′5″E
- Height: 90 m above sea level (NN)

Site history
- Built: 12th century

Garrison information
- Occupants: Knights

The Boosenburg is a lowland castle in Rüdesheim am Rhein, Rheingau-Taunus-Kreis, Hesse, Germany, located in the Rhine valley and dating back to the 12th century. It is locally known as Oberburg (upper castle) in relation to the near and slightly lower Brömserburg. It has been part of the Rhine Gorge World Heritage Site from 2002.

== History ==
The castle was probably built at the end of the 12th century as the family seat for the knight, Lord Fuchs of Rüdesheim, as a square building surrounding a very high, double stepped bergfried, protected by a rampart and moat. In late medieval times, additional living quarters were added. In 1407, the castle was left to the Brömser von Rüdesheim noble family. From 1474 to 1830, it belonged to the Boos von Waldeck noble family.

After the counts of Schönborn-Wiesntheid became owners in 1830, they tore down in 1836 all the buildings apart from the bergfried, which they built even higher, adding Gothic Revival merlons. The next owner, wine merchant Baptist Sturm, transformed the moat to a vaulted wine cellar. His widow erected a Gothic Revival villa, designed by Philipp Hoffmann, and completed in 1872.

The castle has belonged to a winery, Weinkellerei Carl Jung, from 1938. The musical family has arranged chamber music concerts in their residence. Carl's son, Hans Otto Jung, a founding member of the jazz group Hotclub Combo in the 1940s, played there with notable musicians on two Steinway pianos. His son, Edu Jung, also active as a jazz musician, opened the venue also for concerts of the Volkshochschule (VHS, folk high school).

In 2002, Boosenburg became part of the World Heritage Site of the Rhine Gorge.

== Literature ==
- Michael Fuhr: Wer will des Stromes Hüter sein? 40 Burgen und Schlösser am Mittelrhein. 1st edition. Schnell & Steiner, Regensburg 2002, ISBN 3-7954-1460-1, pp 130–131.
- Schlösser, Burgen, alte Mauern. Hessendienst der Staatskanzlei, Wiesbaden 1990, ISBN 3-89214-017-0, p 304.
