= Rupert of Bingen =

Coordinates: 49°57′57″N 7°53′21″E

Saint Rupert of Bingen
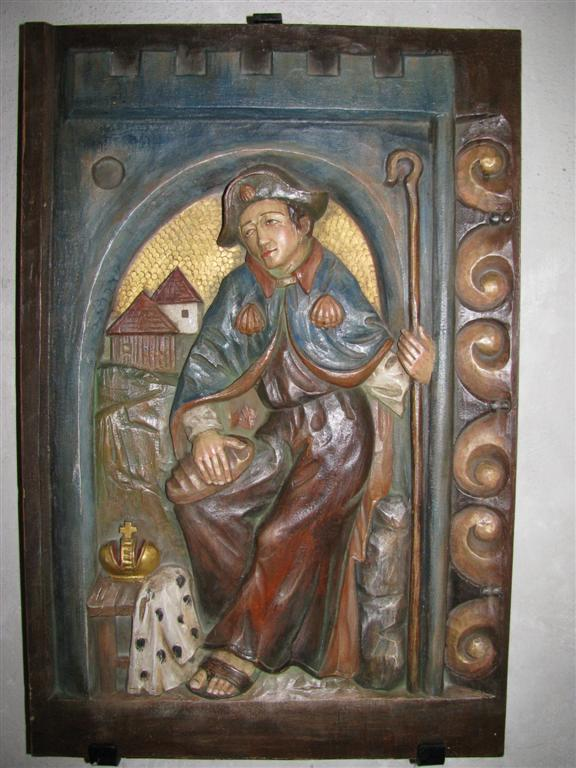
- Born: 712
- Died: 732
- Venerated in: Roman Catholic Church, Eastern Orthodox Church
- Feast: 15 May

Saint Rupert of Bingen (712 – 732) was a German Catholic saint. The son of Bertha of Bingen, a Christian noblewoman, his father was a pagan called Robolaus (Robold). After his death, their child was raised as a Christian by his mother.

At the age of fifteen, Rupert undertook a pilgrimage to Rome with his mother. After his return, he used his inherited wealth to found churches, living with his mother on a hill at the river Nahe, near Bingen that came to be called the "Rupertsberg". There they established several hospices for the poor and needy. Rupert died from a fever, aged 20. He is regarded as a patron saint of pilgrims.

== Veneration ==
Saint Hildegard of Bingen promoted the veneration of Rupert of Bingen, she wrote his biography, Vita Sancti Ruperti.

== Rupertsberg ==
Rupertsberg was a crag at the confluence of the Nahe and the Rhine, in Bingen am Rhein. It is notable as the site of the first convent founded by Saint Hildegard of Bingen, in 1150, after leaving the monastery at Disibodenberg. She acquired the land from Hermann, dean of Mainz, and Count Bernhard of Hildesheim, plus various smaller gifts. The convent chapel was consecrated by Archbishop Henry of Mainz in 1152. The charters were drawn up in 1158 by Archbishop Arnold of Mainz. In 1171, Archbishop Christian of Mainz extended tax concessions to the convent.

The monastery at Rupertsberg was destroyed in 1632, during the Thirty Years' War. Rupert and Bertha's relics were transferred to Eibingen. Rupert's arm is on display in a reliquary in Eibingen church. Other relics were brought back to Bingen in 1814, where they are venerated in the chapel on the Rochusberg.
