= Presberg =

- Ortsteil of Rüdesheim am Rhein
- Interactive map of Presberg
- Location within Germany Location within Hesse
- Coordinates: 50°03′06″N 07°53′33″E
- Country: Germany
- State: Hesse
- Admin. region: Darmstadt
- District: Rheingau-Taunus-Kreis
- Town: Rüdesheim am Rhein
- Elevation: 409 m (1,342 ft)

Population (2018)
  - Total: 870
- Time zone: UTC+01:00 (CET)
  - Summer (DST): UTC+02:00 (CEST)
- Postal codes: 65385
- Dialling codes: 06726
- Vehicle registration: RÜD

Presberg was first mentioned in 1391 as Brensbur and, since 1977, is part of the town of Rüdesheim am Rhein. It lies in Hessen and has about 860 inhabitants as of 2007. The air recreation village is situated on top of Rheingau mountains, 8 km north of the center of Rüdesheim.
