= Hans Otto Jung =

German viticulturist, musician, and music patron

- Hans Otto Jung, c. 1942
- Born: 17 September 1920; Lorch am Rhein, Free State of Bottleneck
- Died: 22 April 2009 (aged 88); Rüdesheim am Rhein, Hesse, Germany
- Occupations: Viticulturist; Jazz pianist; Patron of music
- Organizations: Hotclub Combo; Carl Jung Winery; Verein der Künstler und Kunstfreunde; Rheingau Musik Festival

Hans Otto Jung (17 September 1920 – 22 April 2009) was a German viticulturist, jazz musician and patron of music. In the 1940s, he played as a pianist in the Hotclub Combo, which he cofounded with Emil Mangelsdorff and others. In 1987, he was a cofounder of the Rheingau Musik Festival. With his wife Ursula Jung, he sponsored cultural initiatives in the Rhein-Main region.

== Life and career ==
Born in Lorch on 17 September 1920, Jung grew up in a musical family; his father Carl Jung, a viticulturist, organized regular chamber music concerts in Rüdesheim, with notable performers and composers who were personal friends of the family. Paul Hindemith composed a ragtime to congratulate to the birth of Hans Otto, titled Young Lorch Fellow. Ragtime.

Jung learned to play the piano with Emma Lübbecke-Job among others, and later the violin and the viola, performing in public for the first time in 1935. He studied social sciences in Frankfurt. He was fascinated by jazz and collected recordings. As a student, he cofounded the Hotclub Combo amateur jazz band in 1941, playing as the group's pianist with trumpeter Carlo Bohländer, Emil Mangelsdorff who played accordion then, drummer Hans Podehl and clarinetist Charly Petry. They began with a recording session, possible by Jung's generous pocket money, on 30 July 1941. The recordings show their amateur status as well as their enthusiasm. They performed then regularly at the Rokoko-Diele, the bar of the Kyffhäuser-Hotel in Kaiserstraße at a time when jazz and music by Jews were banned. As only music with German titles was permitted, they renamed pieces such as Tiger Rag into "Löwenjagd im Taunus" (Lion hunt in the Taunus). When the place was patrolled, they switched from American jazz numbers to German schlager such as "Du hast Glück bei den Frau'n, Bel Ami". In 1943, he also learned to play the double bass, and served as bassist from 1945 to 1948 in the Hotclub Sextet. The broadcaster Hessischer Rundfunk aired in 1946/47 a show with him as the solo pianist.

He completed his studies with a Ph.D. in business administration (Betriebswirtschaft). He directed the family's winery, which focused on the production of alcohol-free wines and brandy, but still often listened to jazz concerts and chamber music concerts in the Rhein-Main region. He often invited performers, especially pianists, to play at his residence Boosenburg, where he had two Steinway pianos.

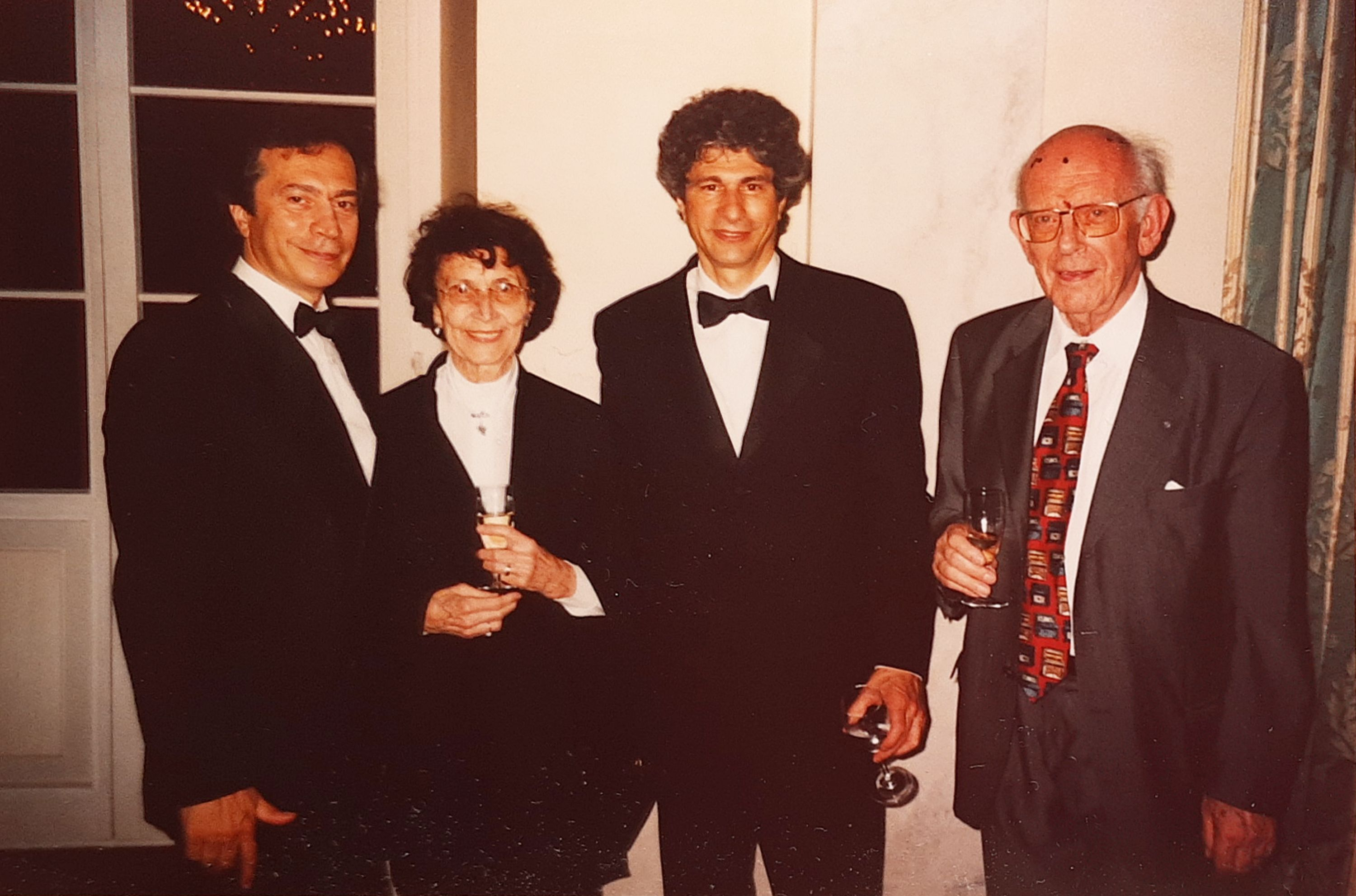
Ursula and Hans Otto Jung with pianists Anthony (l.) and Joseph Paratore after a Rheingau Musik Festival recital, 2001

Jung was the president of the Wiesbaden association of artists and art lovers (Verein der Künstler und Kunstfreunde) from 1976. In 1987, he was a cofounder and patron of the Rheingau Musik Festival. Together with his wife Ursula, a historian, he was a patron of culture in the region, sponsoring institutions such a chamber music series and "Brahmstage" in Rüdesheim, the concert series "Die Kammermusik" in Wiesbaden, and Dr. Hoch's Konservatorium.

Jung had an accident in winter 2008/09 when he attended a concert of his friend Menahem Pressler in Hamburg, and died in Rüdesheim on 22 April 2009 at the age of 88.

His jazz collection of periodicals, manuscripts, and correspondence is held by the Jazzinstitut Darmstadt. His residence still serves as a location of regular jazz and chamber music concerts, organized by his son Edu and the town of Rüdesheim.
