= Niederwald monument =

Monument located in the Niederwald, near Rüdesheim am Rhein in Hesse, Germany

Niederwalddenkmal
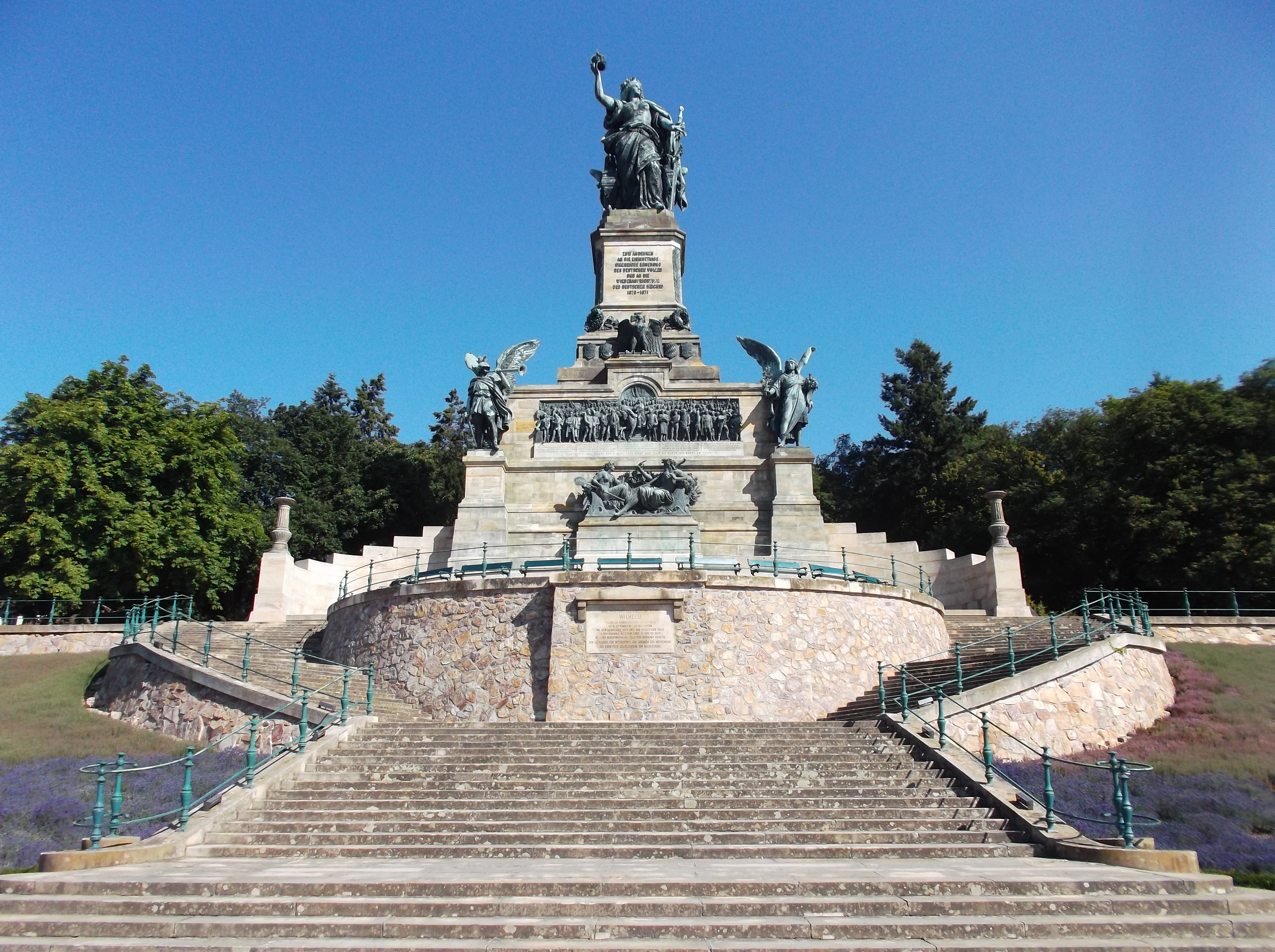
- Niederwalddenkmal in 2015
- Interactive map of Niederwalddenkmal
- Location: Rüdesheim am Rhein
- Coordinates: 49°58′51″N 7°53′59″E
- Designer: Johannes Schilling, Karl Weißbach
- Height: 38 metres (125 ft)
- Beginning date: 1871
- Completion date: 1883
- Dedicated to: Founding of the German Empire 1871
- Website: niederwalddenkmal.de/

The Niederwald monument (German: Niederwalddenkmal) is a monument located in the Niederwald, near Rüdesheim am Rhein in Hesse, Germany, built between 1871 and 1883 to commemorate the Unification of Germany. The monument is located within the Rhine Gorge, a larger UNESCO World Heritage Site. It overlooks the Rhine Valley and the town of Bingen on the far side.

== History ==
The monument was constructed to commemorate the founding of the German Empire in 1871 after the end of the Franco-Prussian War. The first stone was laid on 16 September 1877 by Emperor Wilhelm I. The sculptor was Johannes Schilling, and the architect was Karl Weißbach. The total cost of the work is estimated at one million gold marks. The monument was inaugurated on 28 September 1883. The 38 metres (125 ft) tall monument represents the union of all Germans.

== Description ==
=== Structure ===
The central figure is the 12.5 metres (41 ft) tall Germania on a throne decorated with eagles. Her right hand holds the Imperial Crown, and her left holds the Imperial Sword.

The pedestal beneath Germania has four inscriptions, one on each side, accompanied by four palm leaves on each corner. The next level beneath the pedestal decorated with wreaths of laurel, ribbons and Iron Crosses, and the lower level decorated with coats of arms of German states, and a Reichsadler (imperial eagle).

Beneath the eagle is a large relief depicting Kaiser Wilhelm I riding a horse and accompanied by nobility, army commanders, and soldiers. The relief has the lyrics to "Die Wacht am Rhein" (Watch on the Rhine) engraved.

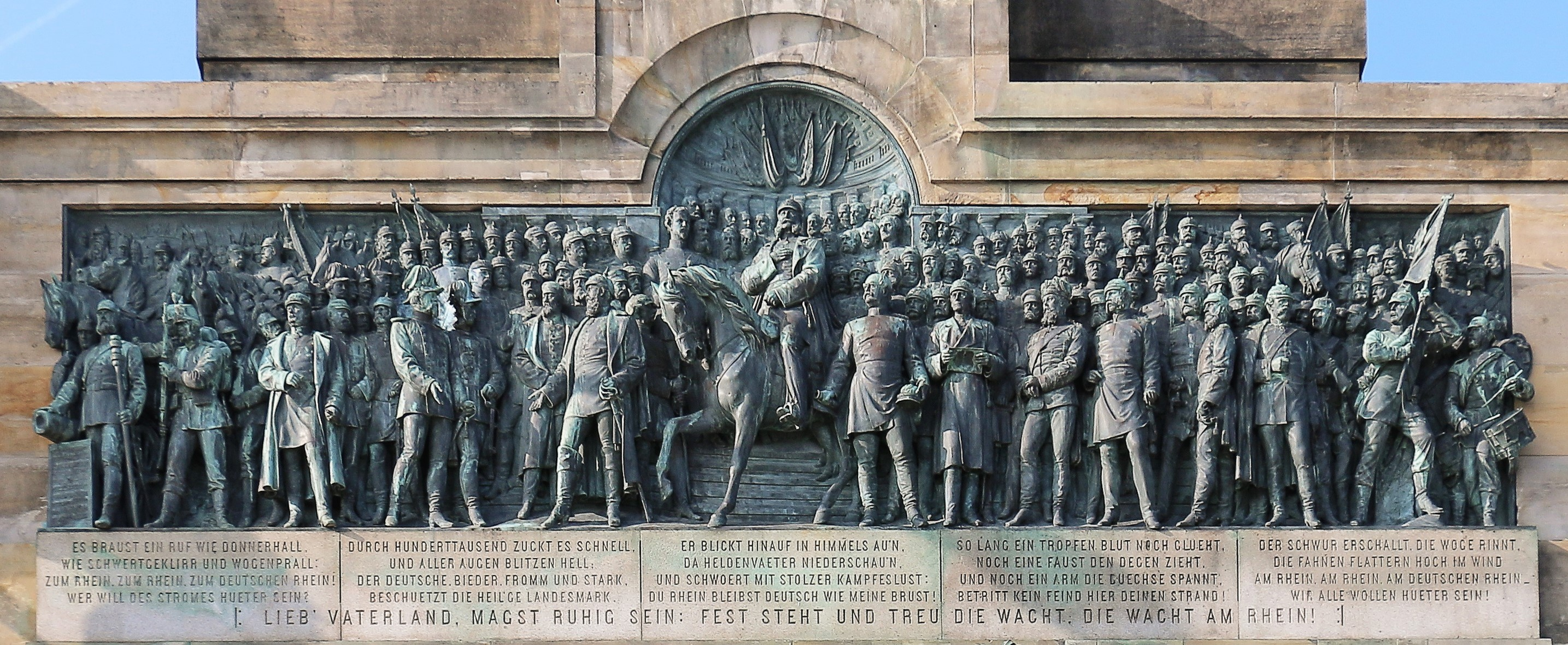
"Die Wacht am Rhein" lyrics, under the Kaiser Relief.

Beneath the relief of Kaiser Wilhelm I is a statue depicting Rhenus Pater giving a bugle horn to his daughter Mosella, it symbolized the annexation of Alsace–Lorraine by German Empire.

The left side of the monument is a large relief depicting a scenario of farewell to Prussian soldiers, the right side of the monument is a large relief depicting a scenario of welcoming Prussian soldiers.

The front right corner of the monument is considered the allegory of peace, while the front left corner is considered the allegory of war.

=== Inscription ===
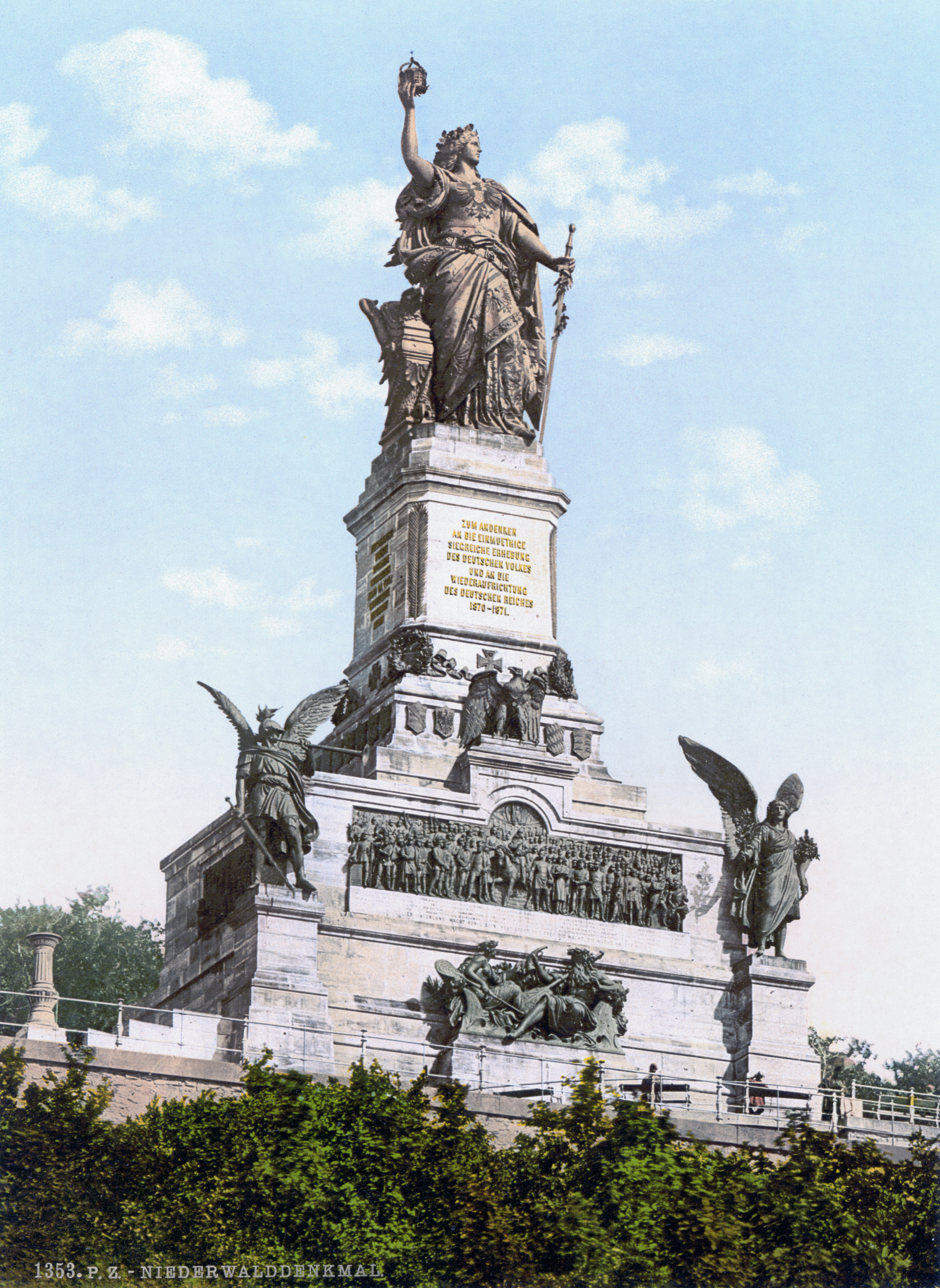
Niederwalddenkmal c. 1900

The monument's main inscription is engraved on the pedestal of the Germania statue:

ZUM ANDENKEN
AN DIE EINMUETHIGE
SIEGREICHE ERHEBUNG
DES DEUTSCHEN VOLKES
UND AN DIE
WIEDERAUFRICHTUNG
DES DEUTSCHEN REICHES
1870–1871

In memory
of the unanimous
victorious uprising
of the German people
and of the
reinstitution
of the German Empire
1870–1871

The left side of the pedestal have inscriptions of Weißenburg, Wœrth, Spichern, Courcelles, Mars la Tour, Gravelotte, Beaumont, Sedan. The right side of the pedestal have inscriptions of Straßburg, Metz, Le Bourget, Amiens, Orléans, Le Mans, St. Quentin, Paris. Each of these places in France were sites of battles in the French-Prussian war of 1870/71.

The back side have following inscriptions:

FRIEDE ZU FRANKFURT
10. MAI 1871

Peace of Frankfurt
10 May 1871

== Location ==
The Niederwald is a broad hill on the right bank of the Rhine located next to the tributary Wisper, opposite Bingen am Rhein. The hill forms the southwestern apex of the Taunus range. Its summit is covered by a dense forest of oak and beech. Its southern and western sides, which descend sharply to Rüdesheim am Rhein and Assmannshausen, are covered with vineyards. The monument is located at the edge of the forest, on the crest of the hill above Rüdesheim.

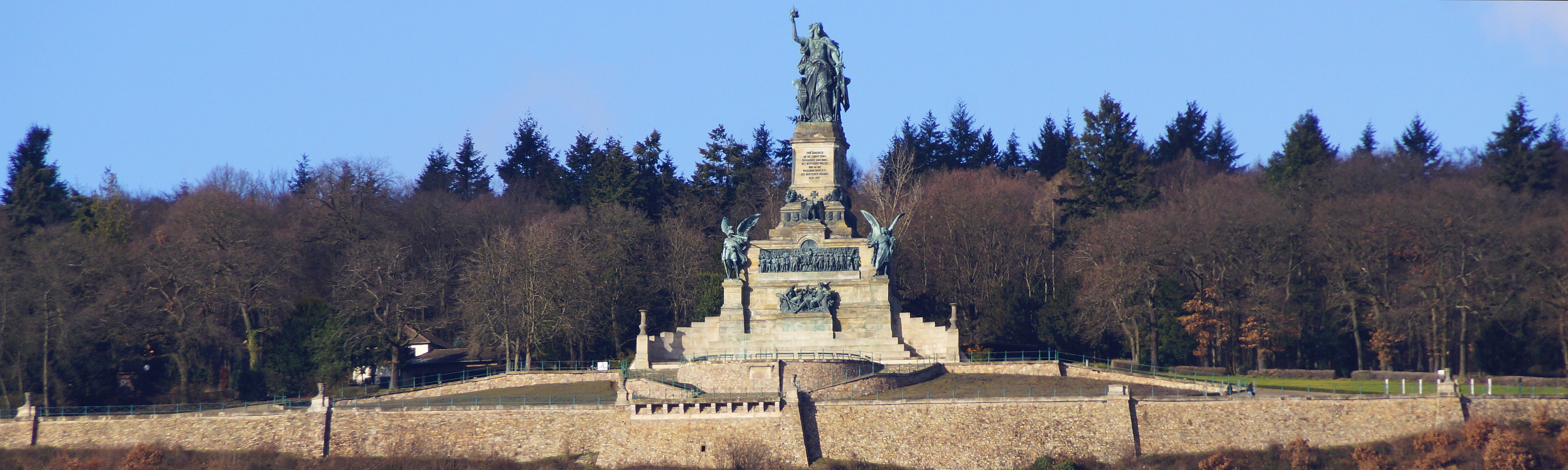
Niederwald monument from 1883 with the Germania statue above Rüdesheim city at the Rhine river in im Rheingau in Hesse
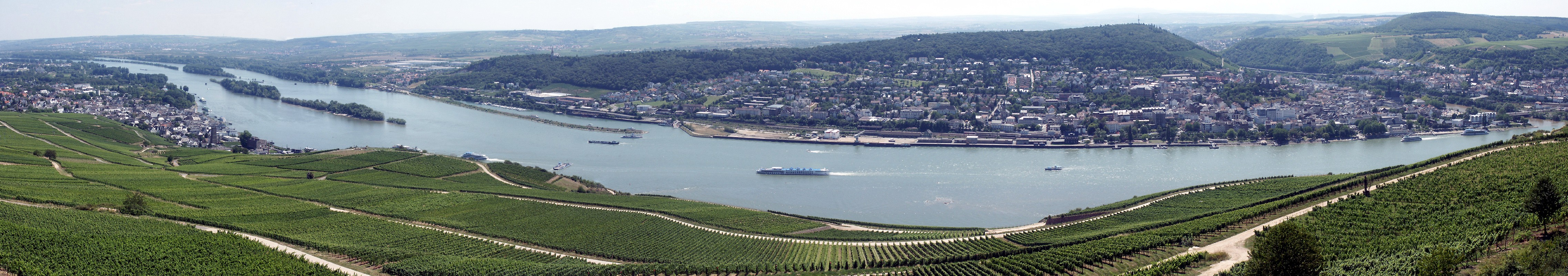
Rhine panorama, view from monument

== Access ==
The Niederwalddenkmal can be reached by gondola lift (formerly a rack railway), from Rüdesheim to Niederwald, by car, by chairlift from Assmannshausen, or by trails on foot.
