= Bertha of Bingen =

Saint Bertha of Bingen
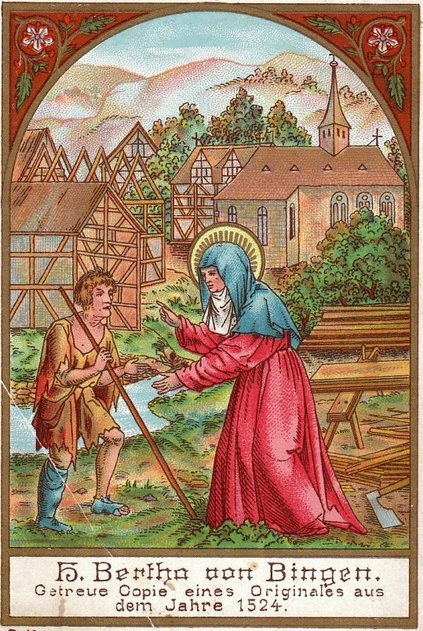
- Born: unknown
- Died: 757
- Venerated in: Roman Catholic Church, Eastern Orthodox Church
- Feast: 15 May

Saint Bertha of Bingen (German: Heilige Berta, died c. 757) was the mother of Rupert of Bingen. Her biography was written by Hildegard of Bingen, who lived in the same region and popularized her cult, about four hundred years later. Bertha and Rupert share a feast day on 15 May.

== Bertha of Bingen ==
Bertha was a descendant of the dukes of Lorraine, and had considerable property along the rivers Rhine and Nahe. She married Robolaus, a pagan, who died when their son Rupert was three years old. Bertha then retired to today's Rupertsberg with her son and the priest Wigbert. She built a small church and led a secluded life with much vigilance and fasting, gave the needy some of her wealth and gradually gathered other people to follow her example.

Bertha devoted her energy to educating Rupert. Following a pilgrimage to Rome, she gave away the rest of her possessions and came to live near Bingen (called Rupertsberg after her son). Rupert died at age 20, but Bertha outlived him by 25 years.

== Veneration ==
The little church on the Rupertsberg became a place of pilgrimage and was still standing when Hildegard founded a monastery there around 1150. Hildegard moved, with her nuns, from Disibodenberg to Rupertsberg, and established a monastery on the site of the ruined castle, where Bertha and Rupert were buried. The Vita Sancti Ruperti was written about this time, "[…] to revive the cult of St. Rupert and to legitimize the vision that called her to move there".

The monastery at Rupertsberg was destroyed in 1632, during the Thirty Years' War. Their relics were transferred to Eibingen. Bertha's head is kept in the Hildegard Church; Rupert's arm is on display in a reliquary in Eibingen church. Other relics were brought back to Bingen in 1814, where they are venerated in the chapel on the Rochusberg.

== Sources ==
- Herbert J. Thurston and Donald Attwater, eds. Butler's Lives of the Saints, vol. 2. Allen, TX: Christian Classics, 1956. Page 322.
- Anne H. King-Lenzmeier: Hildegard of Bingen: An Integrated Vision. Liturgical Press, Colledgeville 2001, ISBN 0-8146-5842-3, S. 122.

== Literature ==
- Werner Lauter: Rupert von Bingen. In: Biographisch-Bibliographisches Kirchenlexikon (BBKL). Band 8, Bautz, Herzberg 1994, ISBN 3-88309-053-0, Sp. 1018–1021.
- Ernst Probst: Hildegard von Bingen - Die deutsche Prophetin. GRIN, München/Ravensburg 2010, ISBN 3-640-68859-7, S. 19, 20 & 52.
