= Jacob Fidelis Ackermann =

Professor of anatomy and surgery (1765–1815)

Jacob Fidelis Ackermann (23 April 1765 – 28 October 1815) was a German professor of anatomy and surgery.

Ackermann was born in Rüdesheim am Rhein. He began his studies at Würzburg and obtained his doctorate in Mainz in 1787. After conducting extensive research and travel, he was appointed as a private lecturer for forensic medicine in 1789. He became a professor of botany and later of anatomy after Samuel Thomas von Sömmering stepped down from his position.

In 1798 the university was dissolved. Ackermann was appointed as the president and first professor of a newly established medical school. In 1804, he became a professor of anatomy and surgery at Jena, succeeding Justus Christian Loder. In the following year, he became professor of anatomy and physiology at Heidelberg.

In Heidelberg, Ackermann founded and developed various institutes, including the Anatomical Theatre and the polyclinic.

In the summer of 1815, Ackermann traveled to his manor near Rüdesheim. There, he died of nephritis shortly after falling ill.

Ackermann was known for his intelligence and literary prowess, as well as for his large build. Despite weighing 300 pounds (136 kg), he was known for his ability to hop long distances on one leg while whistling cheerfully.

In addition to his publications, he is known for creating the dissected skeleton of the rogue chieftain Schinderhannes, which is preserved in the city of Heidelberg. Schinderhannes is a character featured in the novels of Carl Zuckmayer.

== Publications ==
- Über die Kreuzung der Sehnerven, Blumbach's medical bibliography, 1788, III. 307. 706.
- Gustus organi novissime detecti prodromus, Mainz, 1790
- Über den Cretinismus, Gotha, 1790
- Darstellung der Lebenskräfte, 2 volumes, Frankfurt am Main, 1797, 1800
- Über die Erleichterung schwerer Geburten, Jena, 1804
- Kritik an der Gall'schen Schädel- und Organlehre, Heidelberg, 1806
- De febribus epitome, Heidelberg, 1809
- Über die Natur des Gewächses, 1812
- Commentarii de nervei systematis primordiis, Mannheim, 1813

== Sources ==
- Allgemeine Deutsche Biographie – online version
