= Brömserburg =

Stone castle in Germany

- Niederburg
- Rüdesheim am Rhein
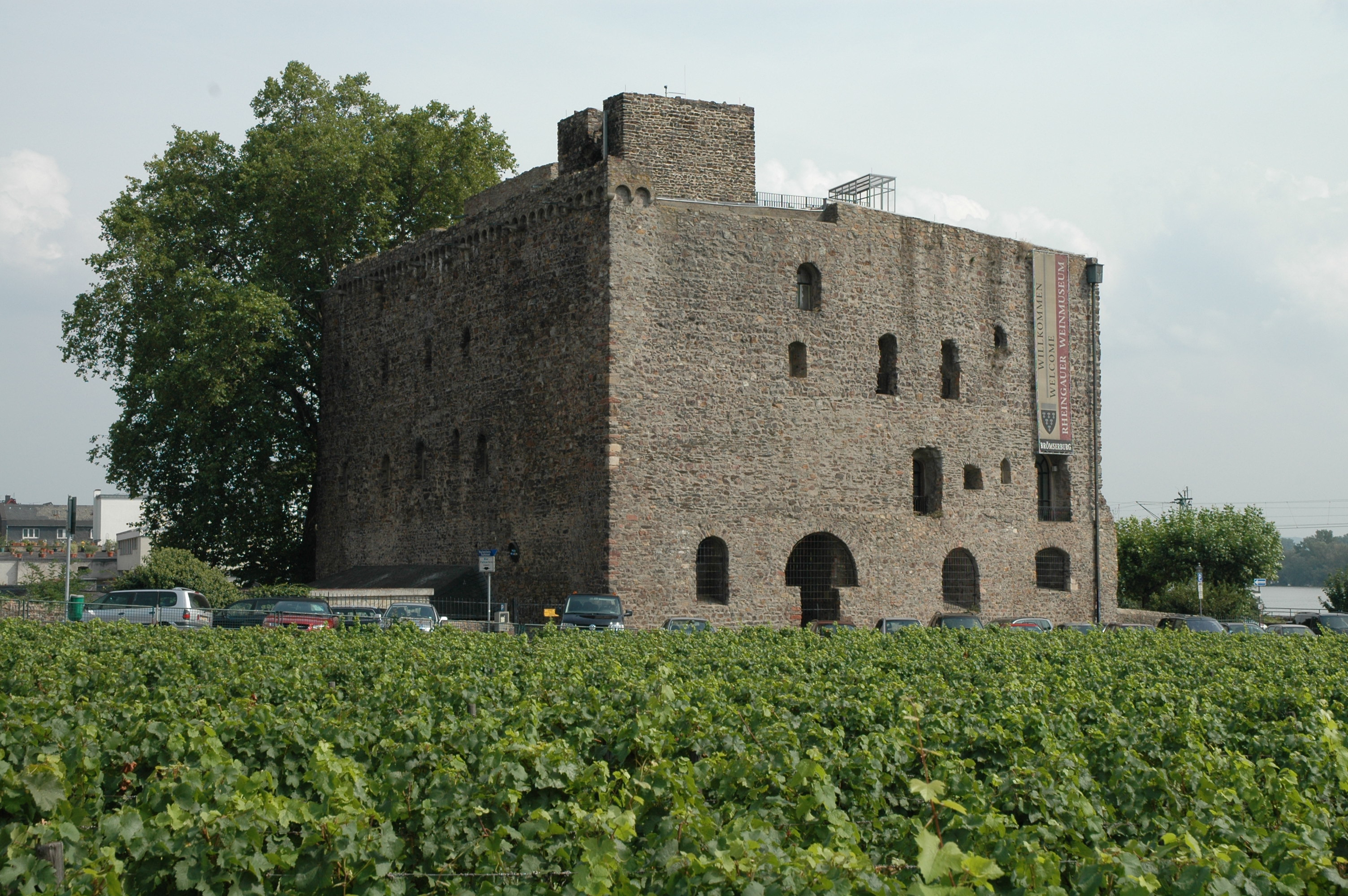
- View from the west

Site information
- Type: lowland castle and settlement
- Code: DE-HE
- Condition: largely preserved

Location
- Coordinates: 49°58′39.41″N 7°55′3.73″E
- Height: 86 m above sea level (NHN)

Site history
- Built: 1186–1190 (2nd construction phase)

Garrison information
- Occupants: nobility, counts

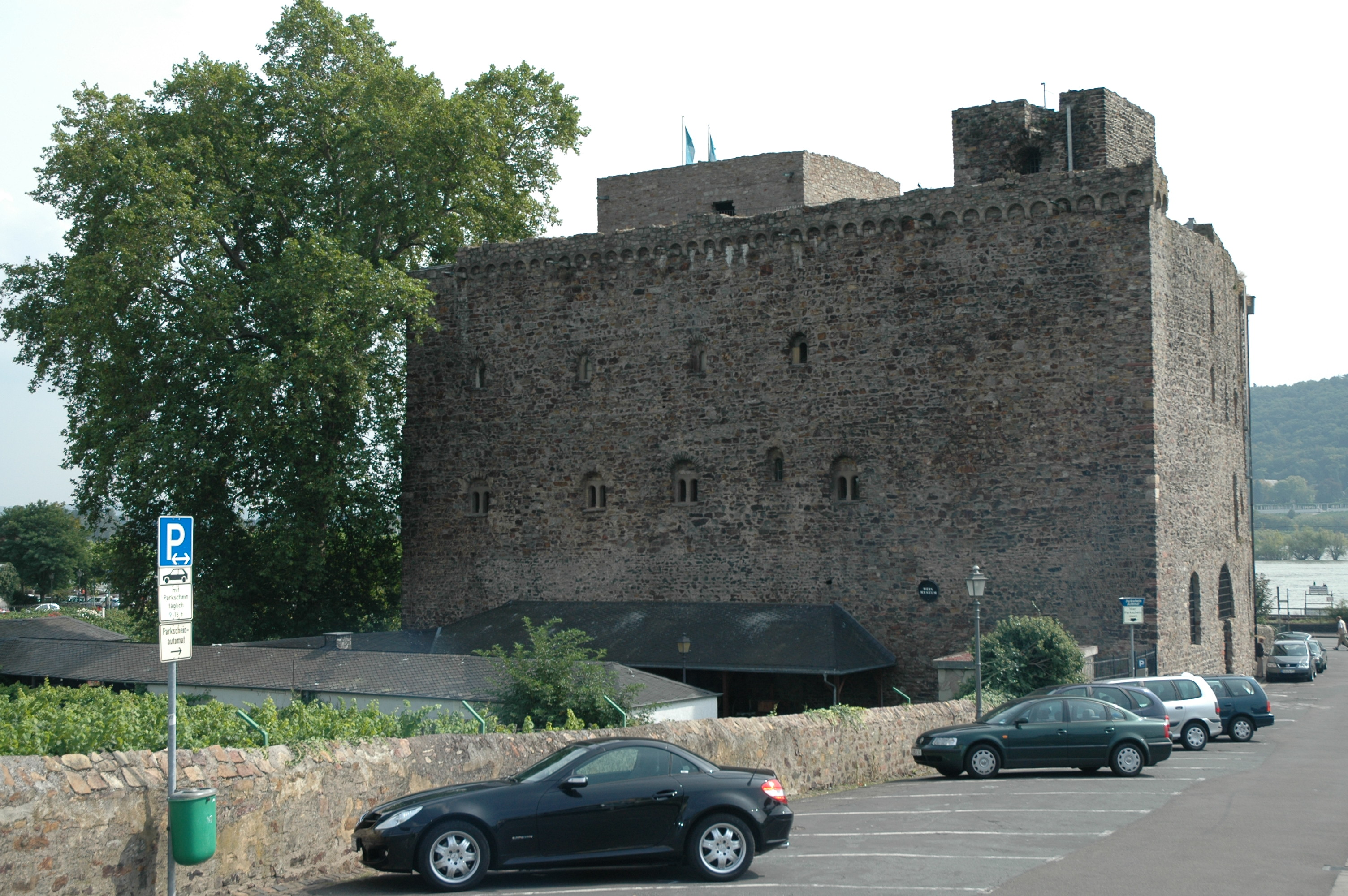
The Brömserburg from the north. Above left: the base of the bergfried

The Brömserburg (also called the Niederburg) is a castle located near the banks of the Rhine in the town of Rüdesheim am Rhein in Rheingau-Taunus-Kreis in the German state of Hesse. Its original structure was probably one of the first stone castles in the Rhine Gorge, now a UNESCO World Heritage Site.

== Construction ==
The older literature (from the 19th century to the 1980s) suggested the Brömserburg was built on the foundations of a Roman fort. However, no antique building fabric has been confirmed and, in particular, it remains unproven that, as previously assumed, it was a watchtower or the bridgehead of a crossing opposite Bingium (Bingen am Rhein) on the left bank of the Rhine. Since this fort was only built in the 4th century, the thesis is not conclusive, because the Romans had already withdrawn from the right bank of the Rhine after the fall of the limes.

Two construction phases are identifiable. Researchers do not agree on the dating of the first phase, theories range from an early medieval, royal Salhof, dating to before 980, to a mid-12th century castle complex. Examination of an alder post from the foundation of the southeast tower, which is considered to be the oldest part of the castle, showed that the tower could not have been built before 1044 and not after 1216.

The end of the 12th century (1186-1190) was the final period of construction for the second castle.

The shape of the castle, even during its first construction phase, corresponded largely to its present dimensions. It was protected by an enceinte and moats; in those days the Rhine flowed, according to historical engravings, immediately past its southern front — unlike today, where there is a road and wide riverbank zone between the castle and the river. However, the enceinte was thinner (1.6-1.7 metres) and lower than it is today. In the southeast corner there used to be a tower house (donjon), now gone. The tower diagonally opposite, which has survived, also originates from this first phase and served to defend the gate (gate tower) as well as acting as a bergfried. At that time, its height reached up to the upper edge of the present fighting platform.

During the second construction phase, the outer wall was reinforced, cladded with brick and raised. Other buildings were built onto the donjon up to the same height, and completely vaulted in up to four storeys (a unique design for a castle on the Rhine); thus a quadrangular structure was created. At the same time the courtyard was raised in height and, in the centre, a massive, new bergfried was erected which was joined onto adjacent elements of the second phase without any joints. Originally it had a wall thickness of more than 4 metres in the lower section and was estimated to be about 35 metres high. Due to the location of the entrance of the new bergfried - the elevated entrance is on the highest surviving floor) it is clear that the tower must have been much higher than it is today; it clearly rose above the adjoining buildings and thus gave the castle a much less "squat" appearance than it has today.

== History ==
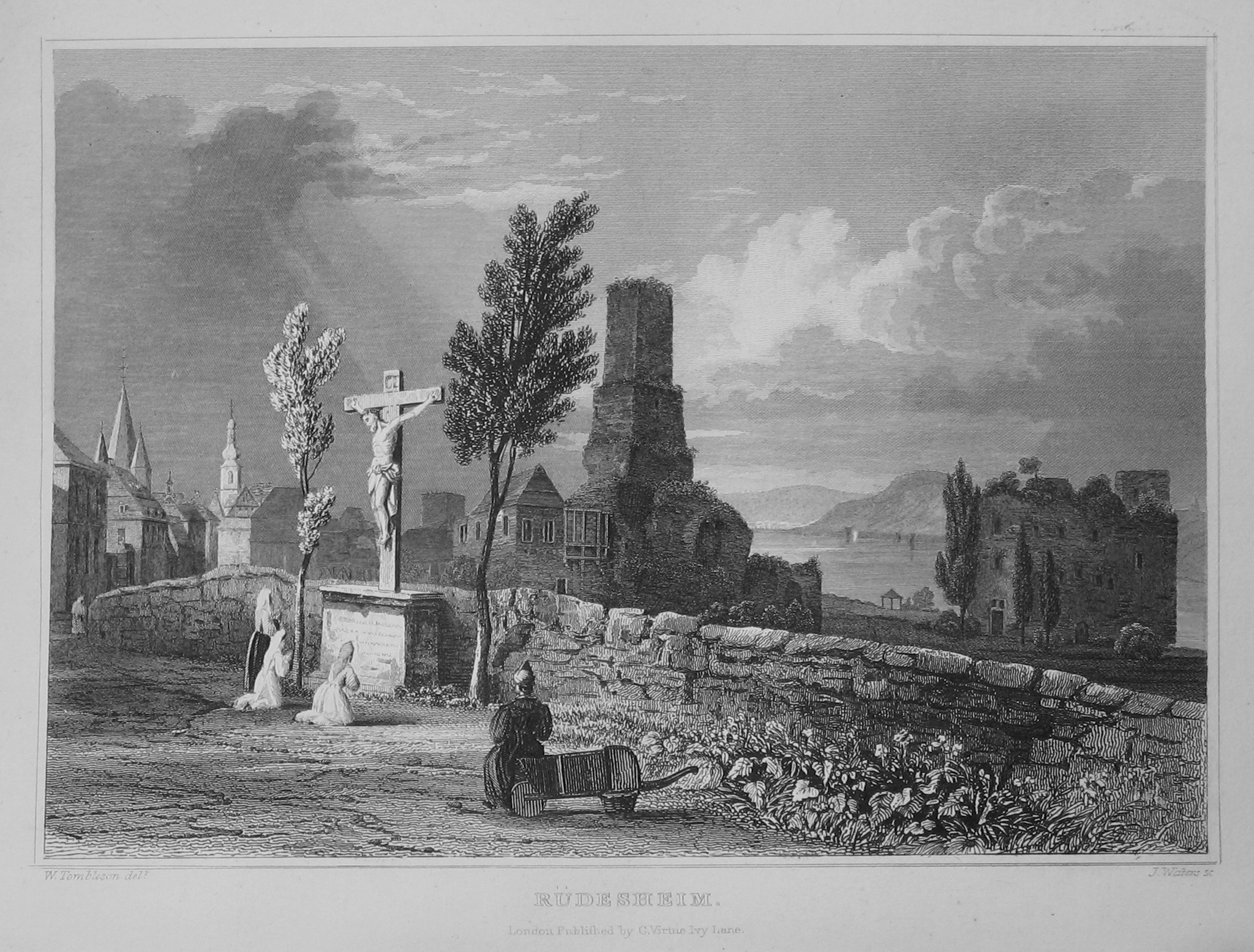
The Brömserburg on a steel etching by Tombleson

In the 13th century, the family of Brömser from the Wisper valley are recorded as castellans (Burgherren) of the castle within the territory of the archbishops of Mainz.

In 1640, the south-eastern corner, facing the Rhine, was blown up by French troops of Duke Henry II of Orleans during the Thirty Years' War, at the same time destroying the upper part of the bergfried and the donjon. A mine passageway was driven into the bergfried, but there was no explosion. It is still visible today.

The popular assertion that the Brömser von Rüdesheim family lived in the castle from 1548 until they died out in 1668, is wrong. What really happened is that, after the main line of the Rüdesheim family died out on the death of Melchior von Rüdesheim in 1538, the Brömsers gradually took over the Rüdesheim fief. The Brömsers never actually lived there, but always resided in their own house, the Brömserhof in Oberstraße 29 in Rüdesheim. After the Brömsers died out, the Archbishop of Mainz granted the fiefdom to Emmerich of Metternich, an heir of the Brömser von Rüdesheim family, in 1678. As the castle remained uninhabited, it fell into ruin in the 18th century and was initially nicknamed "Brömser's dog house", and, later, "Metternich's dog house".

After 1811, the new owners - the counts of Ingelheim - undertook a romanticised expansion of the castle into a country house. In the south wing, these features were removed again in the 1950s during a renovation.

The castle was lived in until 1937. In 1941, it was bought by the town of Rüdesheim. Since 1950, it has housed the Rheingau Wine Museum with exhibits of wine culture from antiquity to the present day. In 1961, the destroyed south-east corner was reconstructed and, in 1969, the keep was raised to a height of 27 metres. The castle and wine museum is as of 2023 closed to the public.

== Literature ==
- Thomas Biller, Achim Wendt: Burgen im Welterbegebiet Oberes Mittelrheintal - Ein Führer zu Architektur und Geschichte. 1st edition. Verlag Schnell & Steiner, Regensburg, 2013, ISBN 978-3-7954-2446-6, pp. 71–73.
- Thomas Biller: Burgen im Taunus und im Rheingau - Ein Führer zu Geschichte und Architektur 1st edition. Verlag Schnell & Steiner, Regensburg, 2008, ISBN 3-7954-1991-3, pp. 91–95.
- Michael Fuhr: Wer will des Stromes Hüter sein? 40 Burgen und Schlösser am Mittelrhein. 1st edition. Verlag Schnell & Steiner, Regensburg, 2002, ISBN 3-7954-1460-1.
- Wolfgang L. Roser: Die Niederburg in Rüdesheim. Ein Befestigungsbau des Erzbistums Mainz im Rheingau. In: Nassauische Annalen 101 (1990), pp. 7–29.
- Kunsthistorischer Wanderführer Hessen. Stuttgart/Zurich, 1984. (still portrays its older condition)
