= Eibingen =

Coordinates: 49.986°N 7.931°E

Eibingen (German pronunciation: [ˈaɪbɪŋən]), now a part of Rüdesheim am Rhein, Hesse, Germany is the location of Eibingen Abbey, the Benedictine monastery founded by Hildegard of Bingen in 1165 (replacing an Augustine foundation of 1148).

Eibingen preserves the treasure of relics assembled by Hildegard, including the heads of Saint Gudula, Saint Bertha of Bingen, Saint Valerian, and Saint Wipert besides one arm of Saint Rupert of Bingen and Hildegard's own remains.

Eibingen was a self-governing community until 1939, when under the secrecy that held sway at the time, it was forcibly amalgamated with the Rüdesheim by the National Socialists, against the community inhabitants' will.
