= Aulhausen =

- Ortsteil of Rüdesheim am Rhein
- Coat of arms
- Interactive map of Aulhausen
- Location within Germany Location within Hesse
- Coordinates: 49°59′41″N 07°53′40″E
- Country: Germany
- State: Hesse
- Admin. region: Darmstadt
- District: Rheingau-Taunus-Kreis
- Town: Rüdesheim am Rhein

Population (2018)
  - Total: 1,208
- Time zone: UTC+01:00 (CET)
  - Summer (DST): UTC+02:00 (CEST)
- Postal codes: 65385
- Dialling codes: 06722
- Vehicle registration: RÜD
- Website: https://web.archive.org/web/20090907230521/http://www.auli-online.de/joomla/

Aulhausen is a village in Hesse, Germany. First mentioned in 1108 as Aulhausen im Rheingau, it has about 1,200 inhabitants (2018). This wine and air recreation town lies in a valley above Assmannshausen, and from 1970 to 1977 Aulhausen was a district in Assmannshausen. It is separated from Rüdesheim by Niederwald.

Aulhausen as well as Assmannshausen are today part of the municipality of Rüdesheim am Rhein. One hundred years before the foundation of Marienhausen craftsmen started building this hamlet. Agriculture and wine growing dominated the town character from the end of the 19th century to the middle of the 20th century.

The biggest employer in Aulhausen is the St. Vincenzstift, a charitable facility for care and support of disabled persons of all ages.
