= St. Vincenzstift, Aulhausen =

Catholic institution

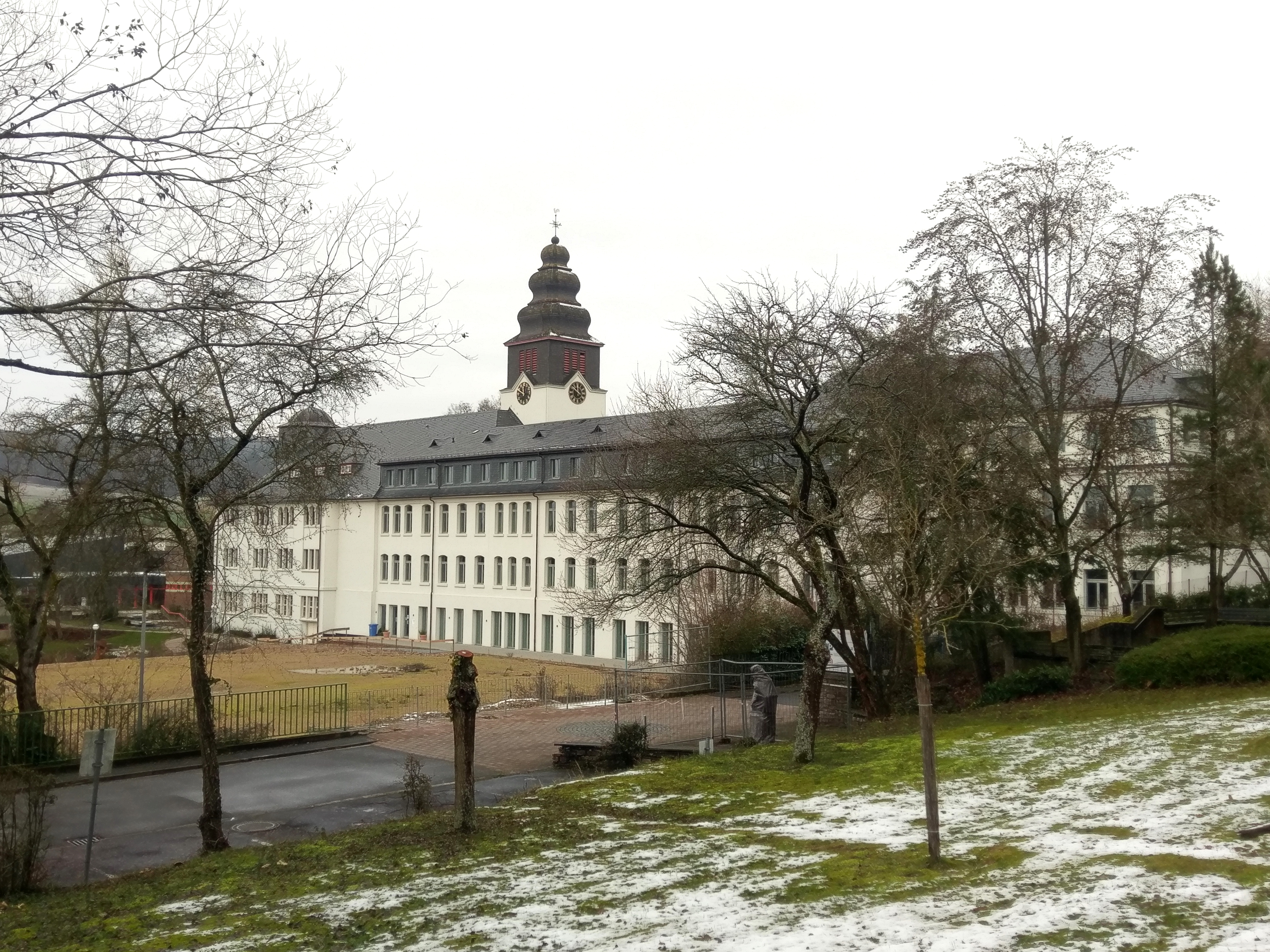
Main building with Marienkirche

The St. Vincenzstift Aulhausen is a Catholic institution of the Diocese of Limburg in Aulhausen, Hesse, Germany, to take care of persons of all ages with physical and mental disabilities all day. Founded in 1893, the charitable foundation is run as a Gemeinnützige GmbH. The facility offers residential places in almost 40 groups, and also schools, workshops and assisted living facilities. It employs over 700 people.

From 1991, the facility has included the Marienhausen children's and youth at the former Marienhausen monastery, which now offers inpatient residential groups, day groups, youth residential groups and assisted living. The former monastery church, Marienkirche, was restored from 2010 to 2014; inhabitants of the institution were included for the design of artwork.

Caspar Söling has been director of the St. Vincenzstift from June 2006. The parish of the foundation is part of Heilig Kreuz, Geisenheim. Franz Kamphaus, the former bishop of Limburg until February 2007, was priest at the foundation after his retirement until his death in 2024. From 2010 Dagmar Bickmann took care of spiritual needs, and in 2023 Benjamin Rinkart followed as priest.
