= Langenbach (Weilmünster) =

- Village of Weilmünster
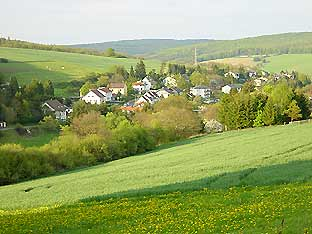
- Langenbach

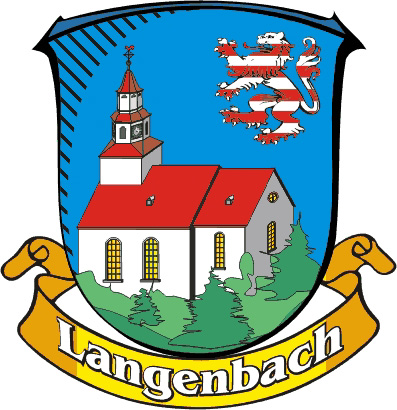
- Coat of arms
- Interactive map of Langenbach
- Location within Germany Location within Hesse
- Coordinates: 50°23′53″N 8°22′35″E
- Country: Germany
- State: Hesse
- City: Weilmünster

Area
  - Total: 6.2 km^{2} (2.4 sq mi)

Population (2021-06-30)
  - Total: 373
  - Density: 60/km^{2} (160/sq mi)
- Time zone: UTC+01:00 (CET)
  - Summer (DST): UTC+02:00 (CEST)
- Postal codes: 35789
- Dialling codes: 06472
- Vehicle registration: LM

Langenbach (German pronunciation: [ˈlaŋənbax]) is a village (Ortsteil) of the municipality of Weilmünster in the district of Limburg-Weilburg in central Hesse, Germany. It has around 370 inhabitants (2021).

== Geography ==
Langenbach is located in the district of Limburg-Weilburg in central Hesse, in the eastern Hintertaunus - in a side valley of the Weiltal. Distinctive geographical elevations are the Hühnerküppel in the north-west, the Hasenberg in the west and the Haagköppel in the south. Within the municipality of Weilmünster, Langenbach borders Rohnstadt to the north and Laubuseschbach to the west. The Hessenstraße forms the border here. To the south, Langenbach borders the villages of Winden and Heinzenberg in the municipalities of Weilrod and Grävenwiesbach (both Hochtaunuskreis). The border here is formed by the Leistenbach. The Weil river forms the western border. Langenbach consists of the old, historic town centre with the surrounding newer built-up areas

== History ==
Celtic fortifications on the Riesenkopf, the "Riesenburg" castle near Rohnstadt and Celtic traces on the Hünerküppel (now Hühnerküppel) indicate a very early settlement in the area around Langenbach. Two important prehistoric long-distance routes, the "Hessenstraße" coming from the Rhineland around Sankt Goar and the "Rennstraße" coming from the Taunus, meet here at the "eisernen Hand" (Hasenberg) and run identically from there towards Giessen and on to northern Hesse. Both roads were originally ancient Celtic long-distance routes. Burial mounds can be found everywhere along the old long-distance paths. Old Celtic field names in Langenbach, such as "Görnhöll" and "Gilling" and the ancient (pagan-Celtic) custom of the "Laubmann" on Whit Monday, which has been preserved to this day, point to a very early settlement, probably by the Ubians as early as 200-500 BC.

The Ubians were resettled on the left bank of the Rhine by the Romans around 38 BC and later founded the cities of Bonn, Cologne and Neuss. Langenbach is first mentioned in a document on 4 November 1335, when knight Richwin von Elkerhausen sold a meadow in Langenbach to his nephew Hiltwin von Elkerhausen and his wife. This meadow is still called Ritterswiese ("knight's meadow") today. The Langenbach church was probably founded by the Conradine Count Conrad Kurzbold in the 10th century. The church was rebuilt in 1717, as the nave had become dilapidated.

Langenbach was once mostly a farming village, but over time it has developed into a commuter village. Many residents now work in the Rhine-Main region, which can be reached quickly due to the transportation options.

In the course of the territorial reform in Hesse, on 31 December 1970 the former market town of Weilmünster in the Oberlahn district merged voluntarily with the previously independent municipalities of Aulenhausen, Dietenhausen, Ernsthausen, Laimbach, Langenbach, Laubuseschbach, Lützendorf, Möttau, Rohnstadt and Wolfenhausen to form the new enlarged municipality of Weilmünster. Essershausen was added on 31 December 1971. Own districts were established for the former municipalities, and they are still represented politically with an own Ortsbeirat and Ortsvorsteher within the larger municipality.

== Demographics ==
According to the 2011 census, there were 396 inhabitants living in Langenbach on 9 May 2011. Of these, 6 (1.5%) were foreigners. In terms of age, 60 residents were under 18, 171 between 18 and 49, 87 between 50 and 64 and 75 residents were older.

Year	Population
1825	296
1852	321
1871	327
1905	291
1946	436
1970	379
2011	396
2021	373

== Sights ==
Langenbach is known for its old village church, which houses a Roman-Corinthian baptismal font, a church organ built by organ builder Friedrich Drauth in 1770 and one of the oldest bells in the Nassau region, the Georgsglocke. The church is therefore also the town's landmark and the motif of Langenbach's coat of arms.

There are also a number of historic buildings, like the old school building.

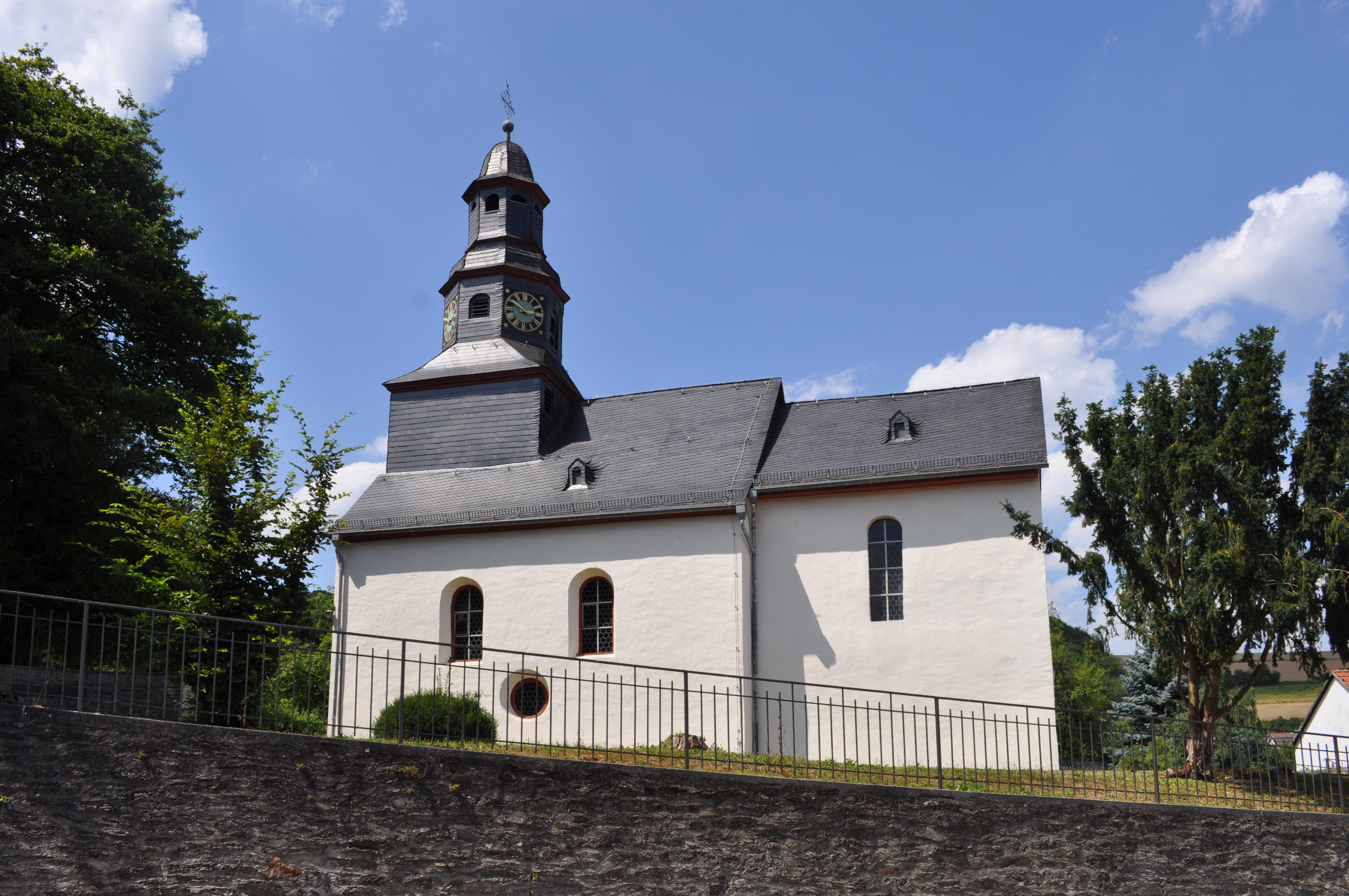
Langenbach church

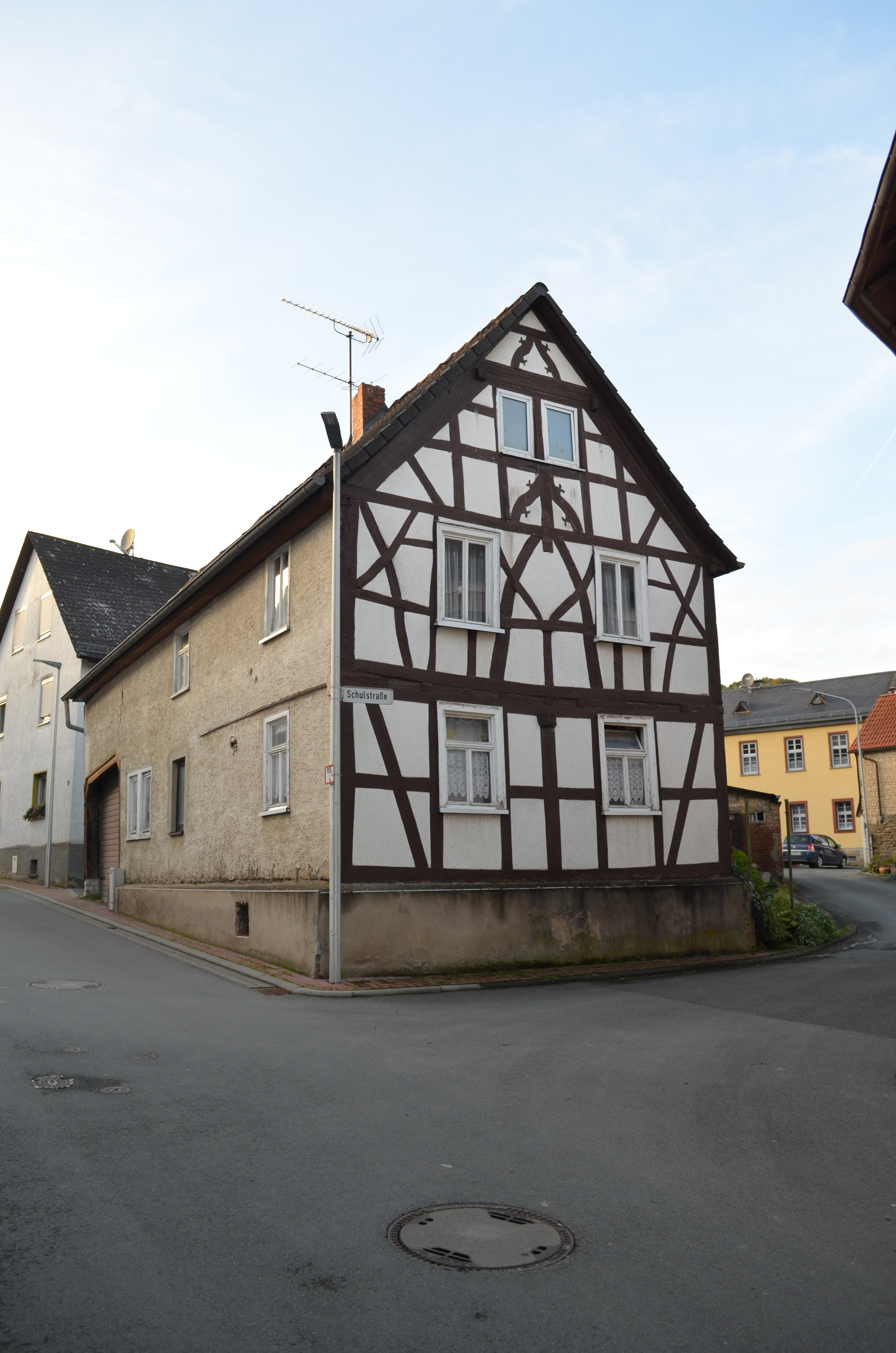
Old house in Schulstraße

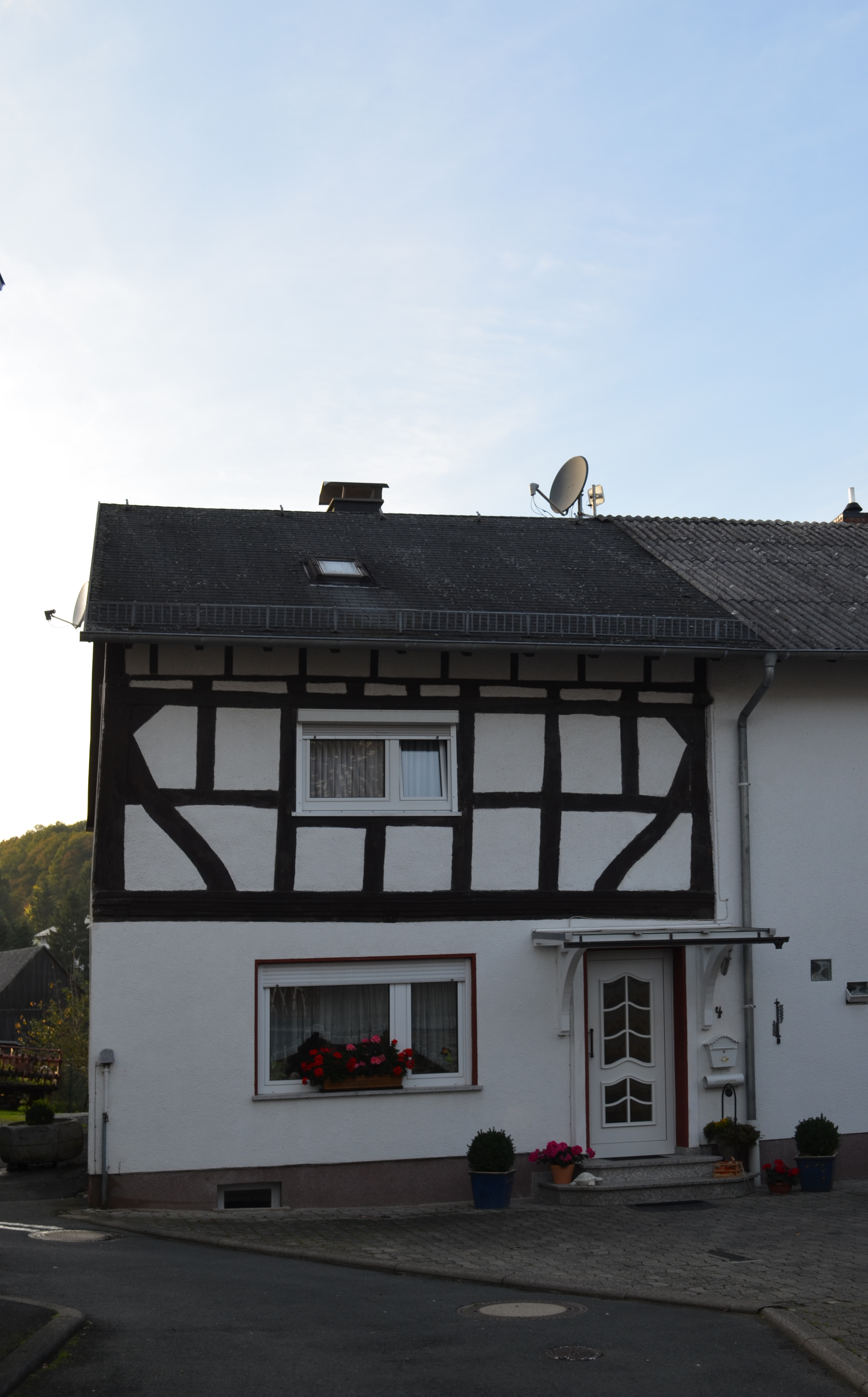
Old house in Gäßchen

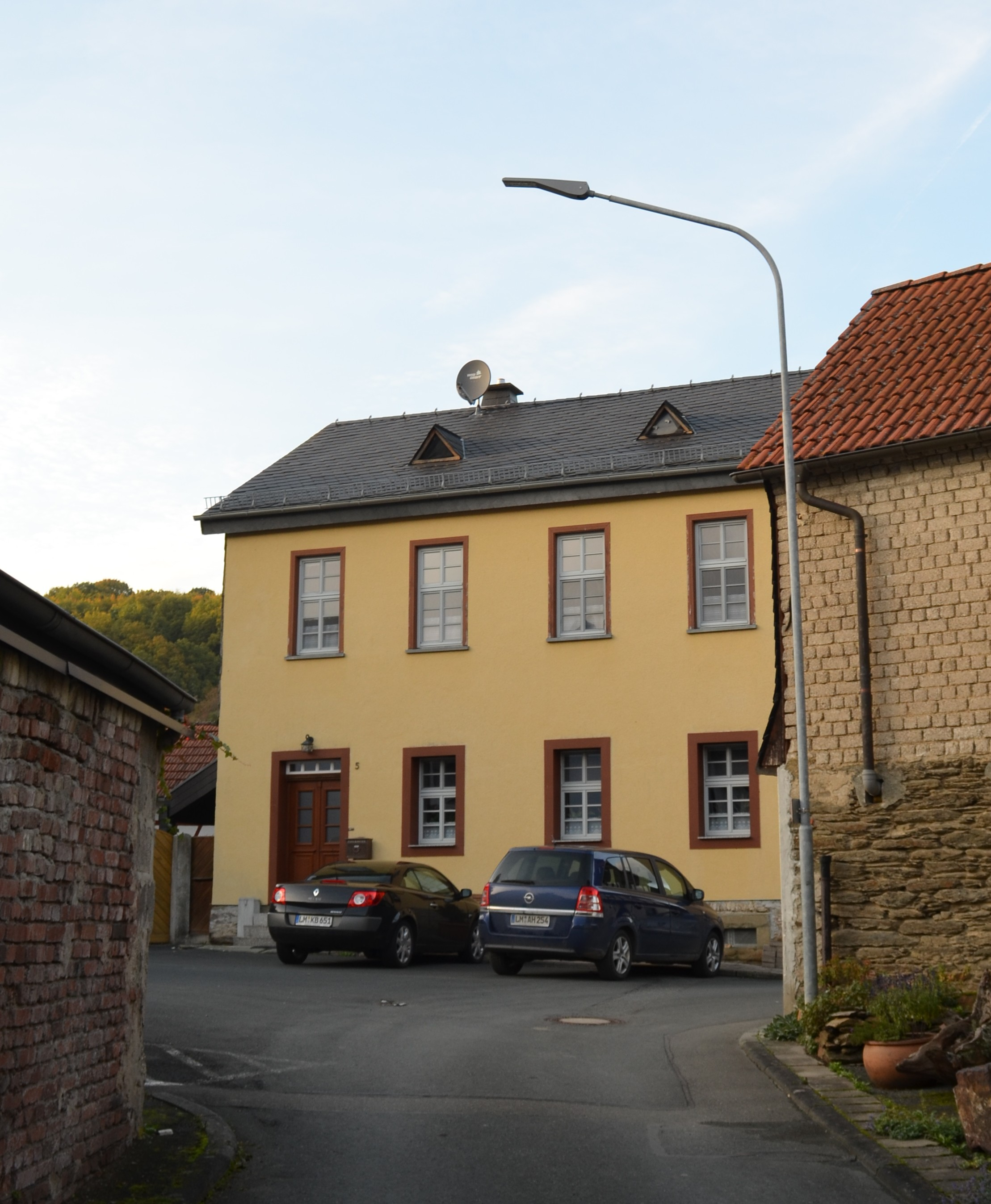
Old school building

== Community life ==
Langenbach has an intact cultural life. The Langenbach youth fire brigade, which has been active since 1 December 1981, is part of the Langenbach volunteer fire brigade, which was founded in 1934. The Langenbach sports club with its table tennis section has achieved many successes. There is also the mixed choir "Eintracht" Langenbach and the Protestant church choir. Langenbach has a village community centre in Schulstraße, a sports pitch, a children's playground and hiking trails.
