= Essershausen =

- Village of Weilmünster
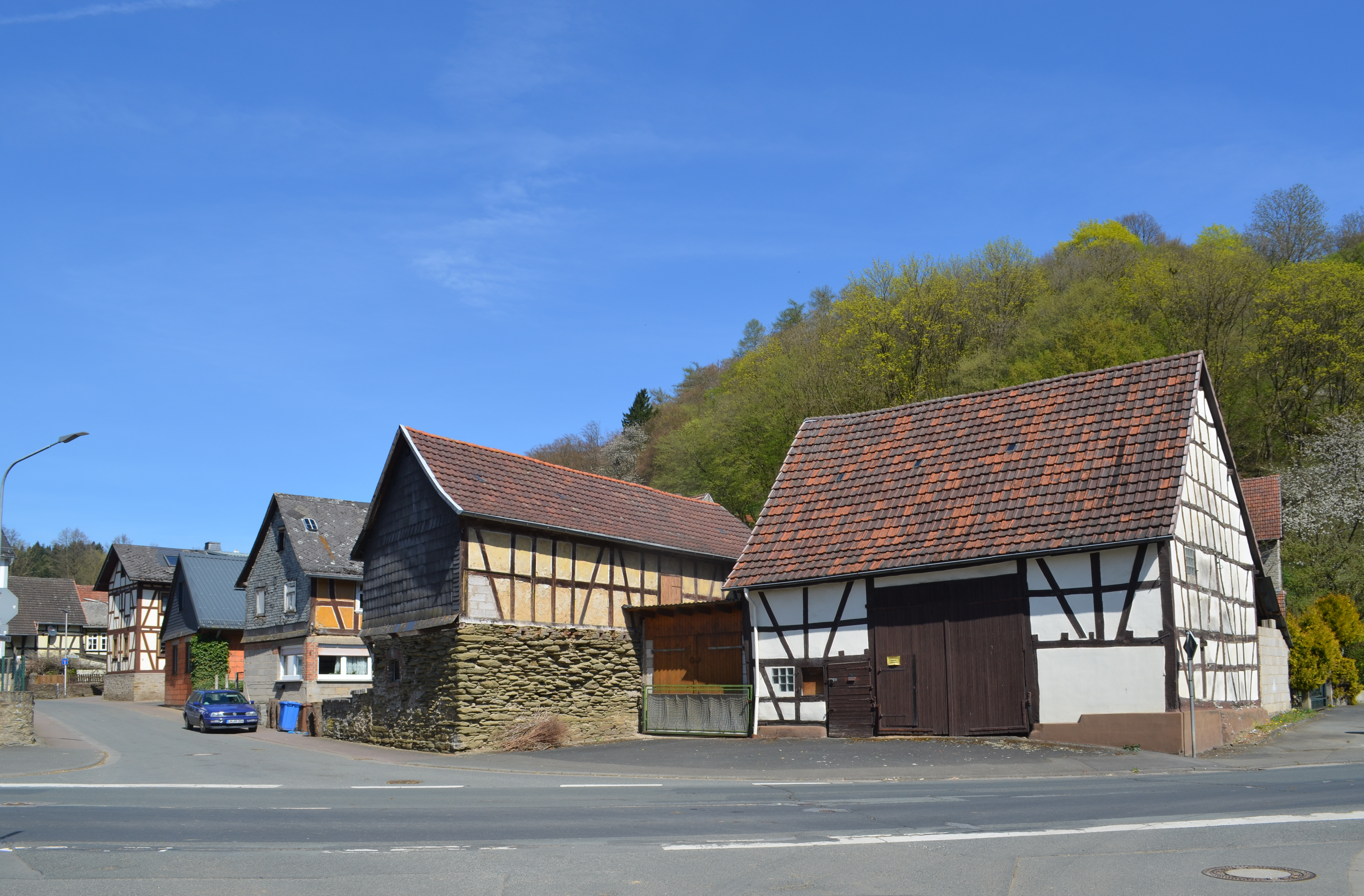
- Main street of Essershausen

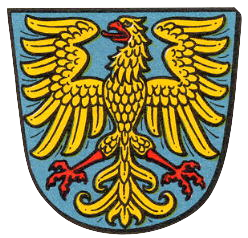
- Coat of arms
- Interactive map of Essershausen
- Location within Germany Location within Hesse
- Coordinates: 50°27′28″N 8°19′34″E
- Country: Germany
- State: Hesse
- City: Weilmünster

Area
  - Total: 3.96 km^{2} (1.53 sq mi)

Population (2021-06-30)
  - Total: 201
  - Density: 50.8/km^{2} (131/sq mi)
- Time zone: UTC+01:00 (CET)
  - Summer (DST): UTC+02:00 (CEST)
- Postal codes: 35789
- Dialling codes: 06472
- Vehicle registration: LM

Essershausen is a village (Ortsteil) of the municipality of Weilmünster in the district of Limburg-Weilburg in central Hesse. It has around 200 inhabitants (2021).

== History ==
The village was first mentioned in a document in 1233 as the seat of an imperial knight. At that time the village was called Eschershusen. The place was known under the names Eichschershusen, Eschershusen, Achesshusen, Eschersshusen, Eschershausen and Essershausen to today's Essershausen. The knight lived in a farm in the middle of the valley, surrounded by a moat. The modernly built-over castle hill in Weiltal has been preserved. A second castle complex was located northeast of the village on a mountain spur surrounded by the Gundersbach on the extension of the Bermbacher Weg in the forest. Visible from the forest path are the neck ditch and behind it the castle hill on the mountain spur above the Gundersbach. A document from 1391 showed that the bishops of Worms rewarded Konrad von Essershausen with a castle, church and mill in Essershausen. In the course of the general decline of chivalry, the Essershausen knightship disappeared. The village came under the rule of the Counts of Nassau, to whom it belonged for centuries.

The local church was built in 1391. In 1520 the village was made a parish. The parish includes Bermbach, Laimbach and Edelsberg. From the middle of the 19th century until after the Second World War, ironstone was mined near the town in a mine called "Fritz".

In the course of the territorial reform in Hesse, on 31 December 1970 the former market town of Weilmünster in the Oberlahn district merged voluntarily with the previously independent municipalities of Aulenhausen, Dietenhausen, Ernsthausen, Laimbach, Langenbach, Laubuseschbach, Lützendorf, Möttau, Rohnstadt and Wolfenhausen to form the new enlarged municipality of Weilmünster. Essershausen was added on 31 December 1971. Own districts were established for the former municipalities, and they are still represented politically with an own Ortsbeirat and Ortsvorsteher within the larger municipality.

== Demographics ==
According to the 2011 census, 213 residents lived in Essershausen on May 9, 2011. Of these, 18 (8.5%) were foreigners. In terms of age, 24 residents were under 18, 90 were between 18 and 49, 54 were between 50 and 64 and 45 residents were older. The residents lived in 93 households.

Year	Population
1825	141
1852	170
1871	224
1905	219
1946	281
1970	224
2011	213
2021	201

== Sights ==
There are a number of historic buildings and sites, like the old school building and the local church.

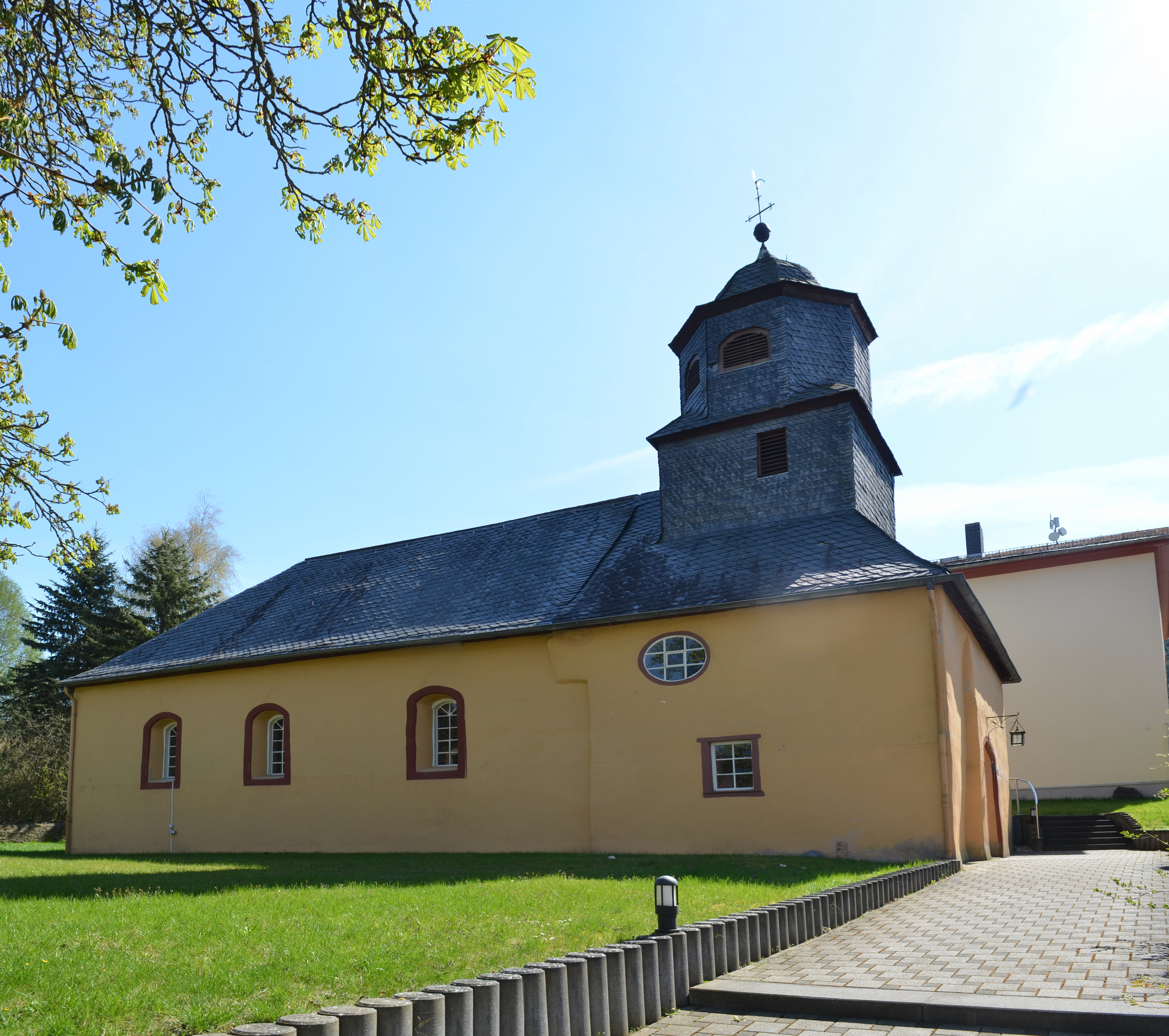
Essershausen church

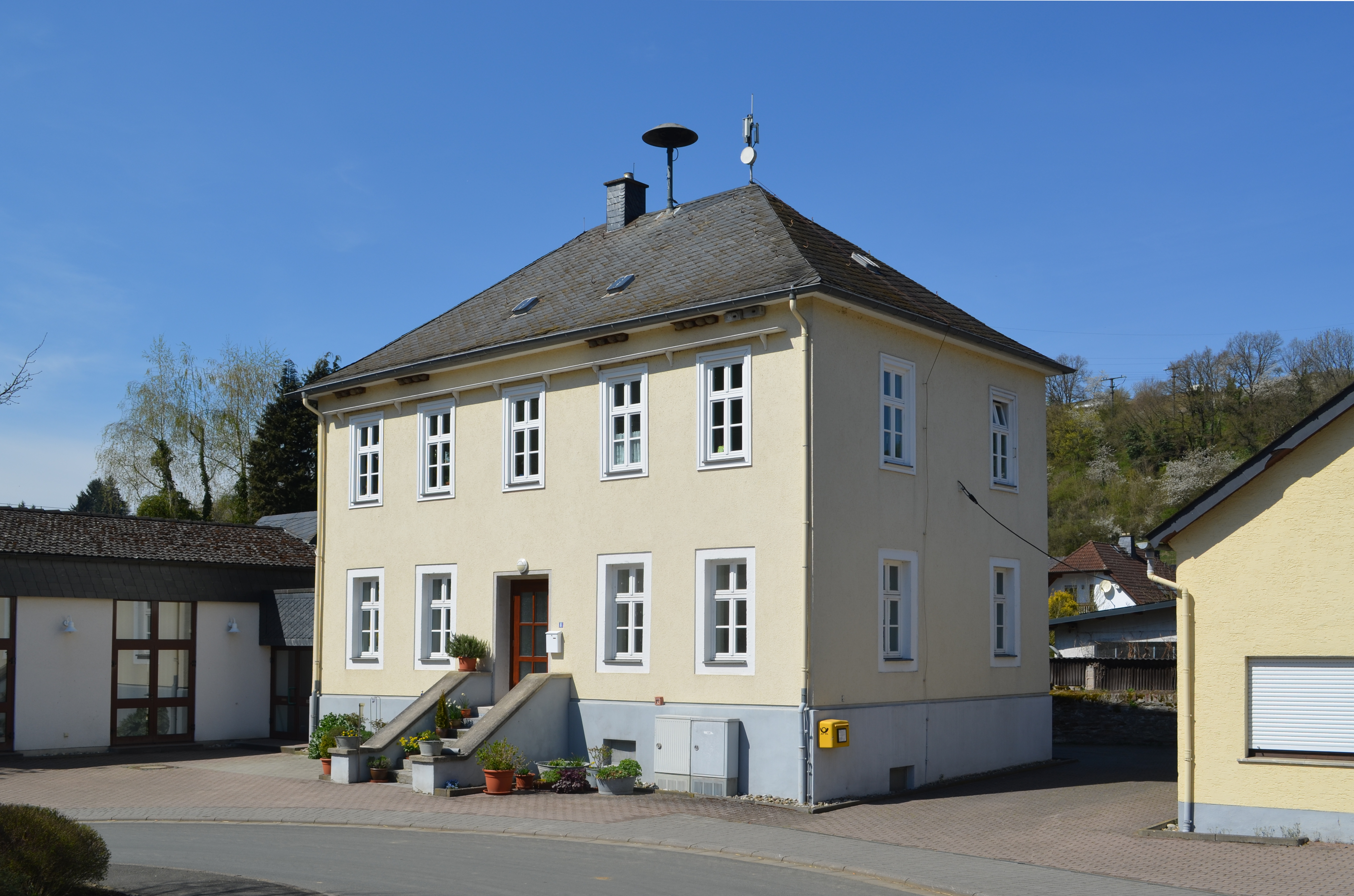
Old school building

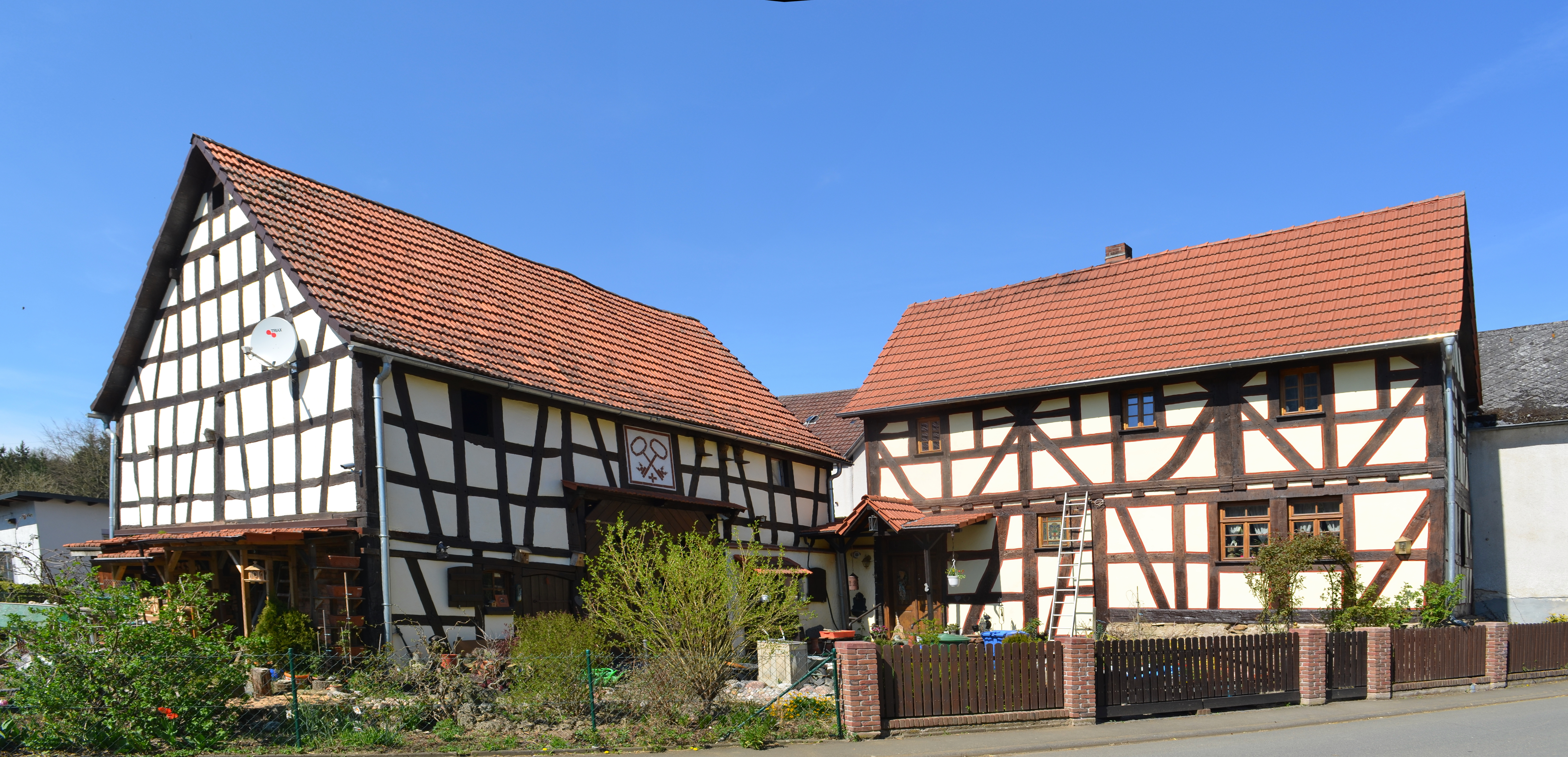
Old houses in Brückenstraße

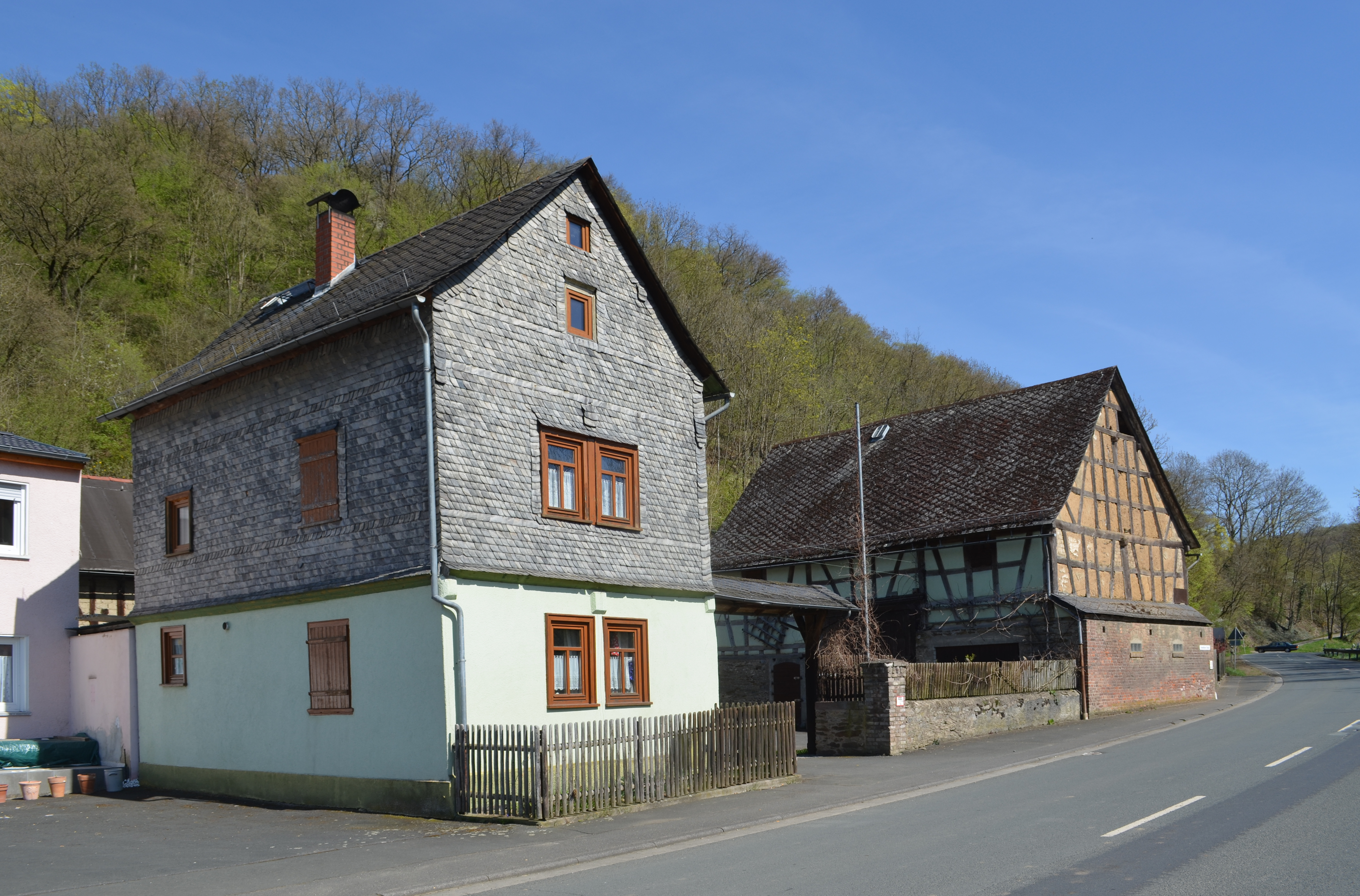
Old houses in Freienfelser Straße

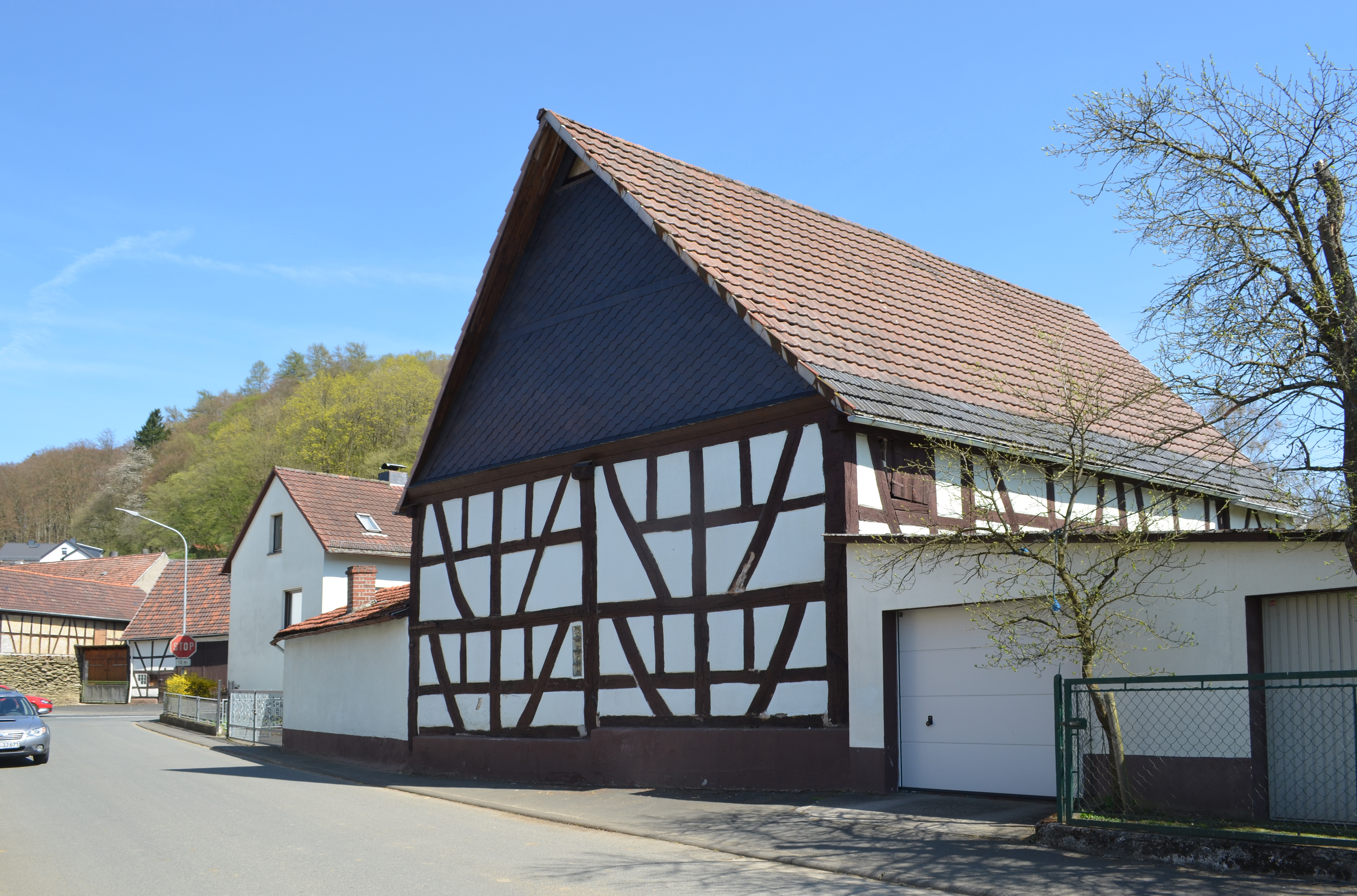
Old barn

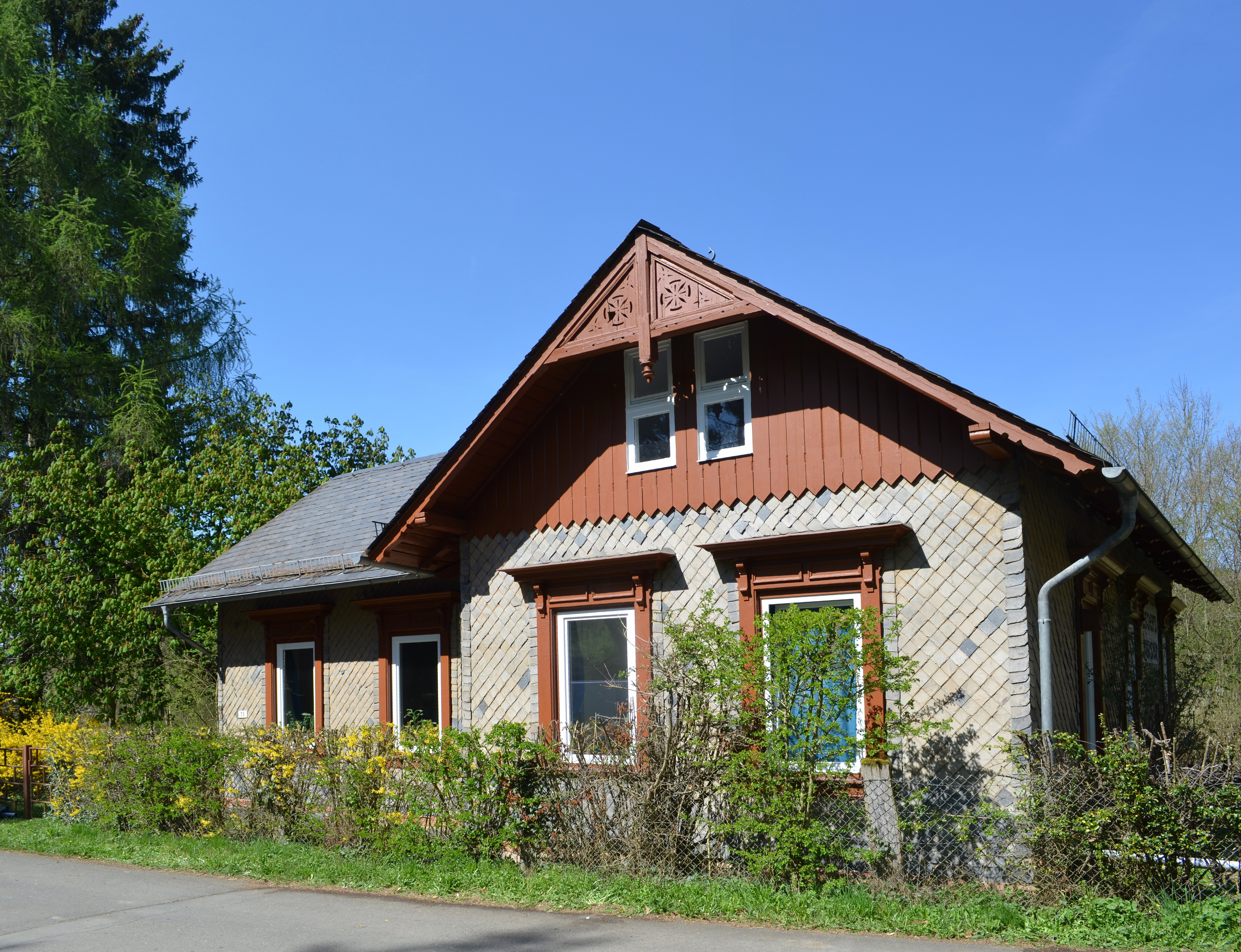
Old train station

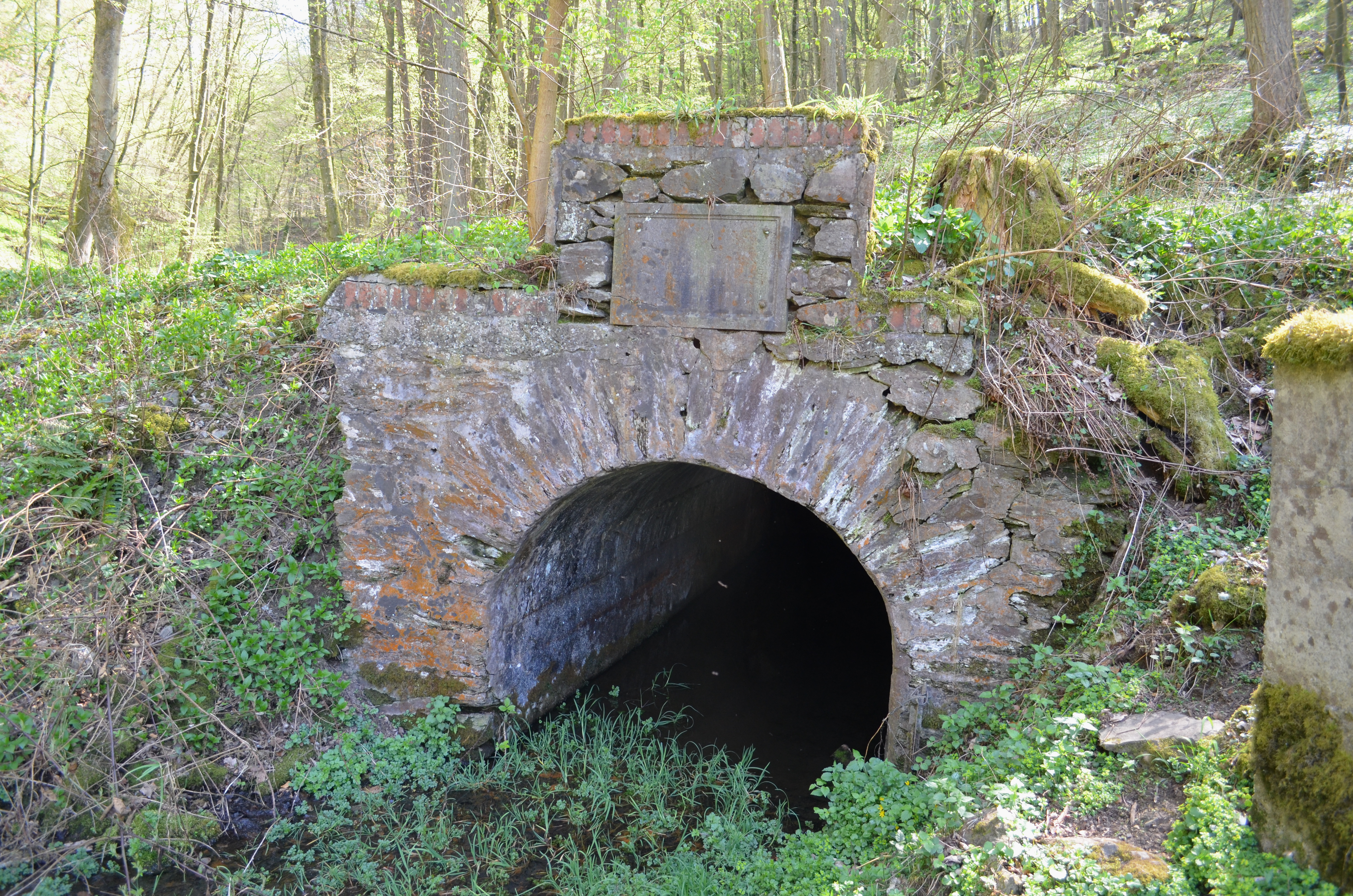
Old mine

== Community life ==
There is the village community center on Brückenstraße, the sports field in Weilwiesen, a children's playground and cycling and hiking trails. Since 1934, the Essershausen Volunteer Fire Department (Freiwillige Feuerwehr Essershausen) has been providing fire protection and general assistance in this area.
