= Laimbach =

- Village of Weilmünster
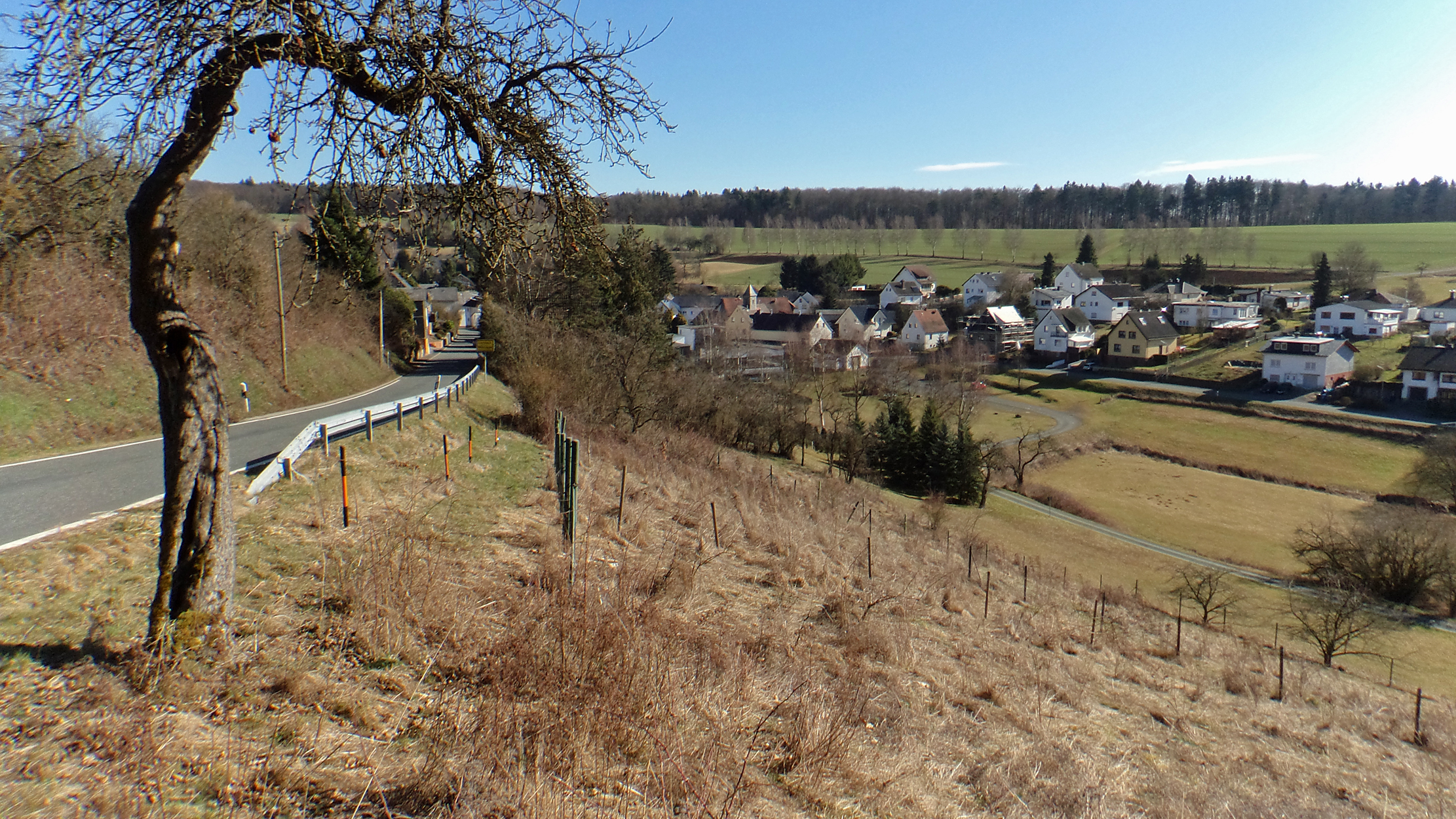
- Laimbach
- Interactive map of Laimbach
- Location within Germany Location within Hesse
- Coordinates: 50°27′56″N 8°21′18″E
- Country: Germany
- State: Hesse
- City: Weilmünster

Area
  - Total: 2.65 km^{2} (1.02 sq mi)

Population (2021-06-30)
  - Total: 235
  - Density: 88.7/km^{2} (230/sq mi)
- Time zone: UTC+01:00 (CET)
  - Summer (DST): UTC+02:00 (CEST)
- Postal codes: 35789
- Dialling codes: 06472
- Vehicle registration: LM

Laimbach is a village (Ortsteil) of the municipality of Weilmünster in the district of Limburg-Weilburg in central Hesse. It has around 230 inhabitants (2021).

== Geography ==
The village is located in a side valley of the Weil river in the eastern Hintertaunus, surrounded by forest area. It is the northernmost part of the municipality and is located between the villages of Bermbach (Weilburg) in the north and Ernsthausen in the south. The highest point near Laimbach is the Hollandskopf at 339 metres above sea level.

== History ==
As far as is known, the place was first mentioned in writing in 1299. The feudal lord of Laimbach changed several times; in the 14th and 15th centuries, for example, the Bishopric of Worms was the owner of the village. In the town and the surrounding area, iron ore was mined and smelted into iron by the residents; There were several iron ore mines in the late Middle Ages. This was confirmed in a document in 1565 by Count Albrecht of Nassau-Weilburg and Saarbrücken. From 1771 at the latest, Laimbach had its own Schultheiß and from 1852 a mayor.

After Hitler came to power on January 30, 1933, the last free mayoral elections in Laimbach took place on March 12. Julius Stroh (SPD) won, whose election was declared valid. At the beginning of April 1933 he was forcibly deposed by SA troops and August Löw was installed as the new mayor.

In the course of the territorial reform in Hesse, on 31 December 1970 the former market town of Weilmünster in the Oberlahn district merged voluntarily with the previously independent municipalities of Aulenhausen, Dietenhausen, Ernsthausen, Laimbach, Langenbach, Laubuseschbach, Lützendorf, Möttau, Rohnstadt and Wolfenhausen to form the new enlarged municipality of Weilmünster. Essershausen was added on 31 December 1971. Own districts were established for the former municipalities, and they are still represented politically with an own Ortsbeirat and Ortsvorsteher within the larger municipality.

== Demographics ==
According to the 2011 census, 255 residents lived in Laimbach on May 9, 2011. Of these, 9 (3.5%) were foreigners. In terms of age, 51 residents were under 18 years old, 96 were between 18 and 49, 69 were between 50 and 64 and 36 residents were older. The residents lived in 114 households.

Year	Population
1825	98
1852	143
1871	185
1905	187
1946	293
1970	230
2011	255
2021	235

== Sights ==
There are also a number of historic buildings, like the old school building.

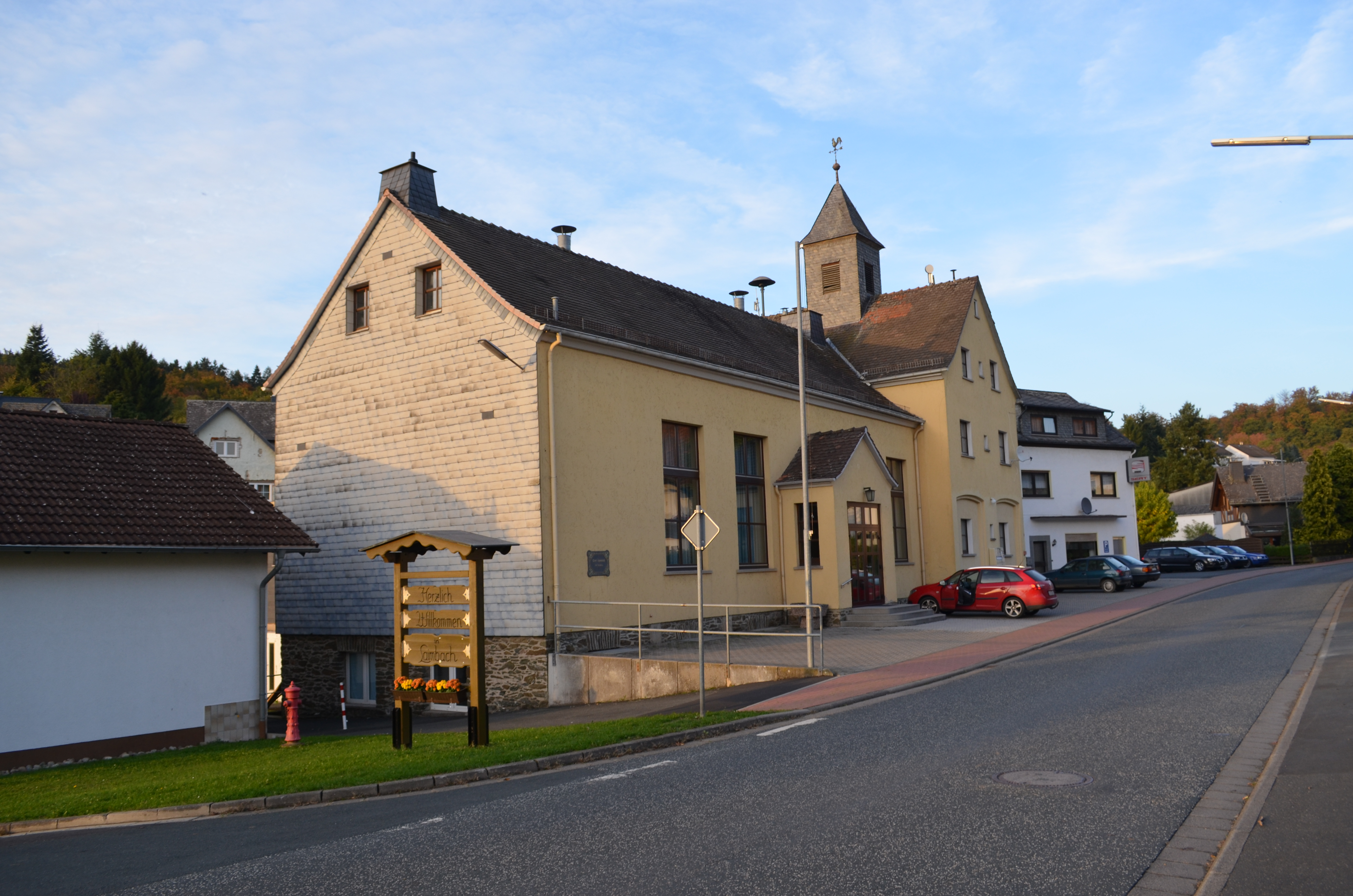
Laimbach town hall

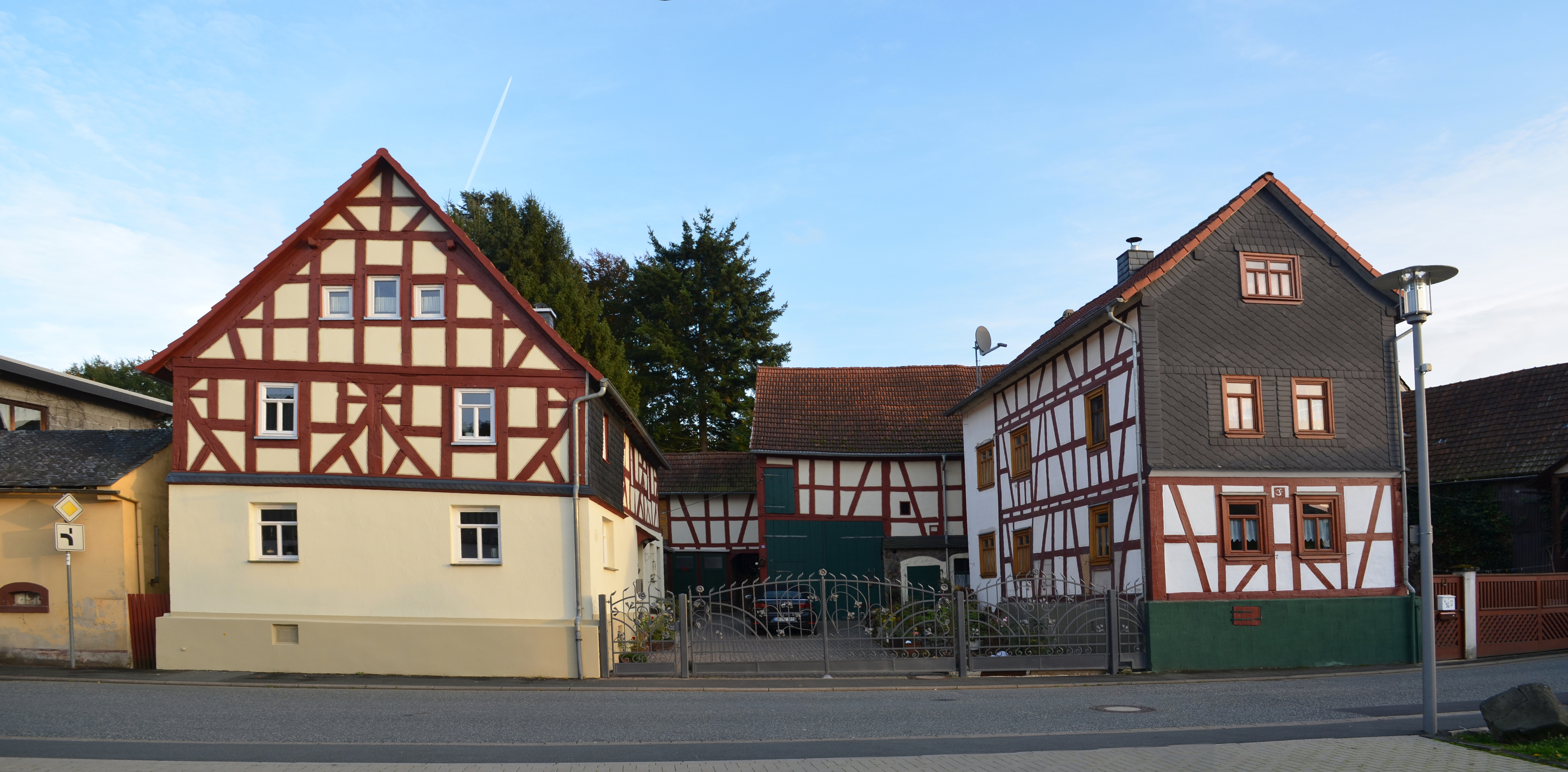
Old houses in Grauensteinstraße

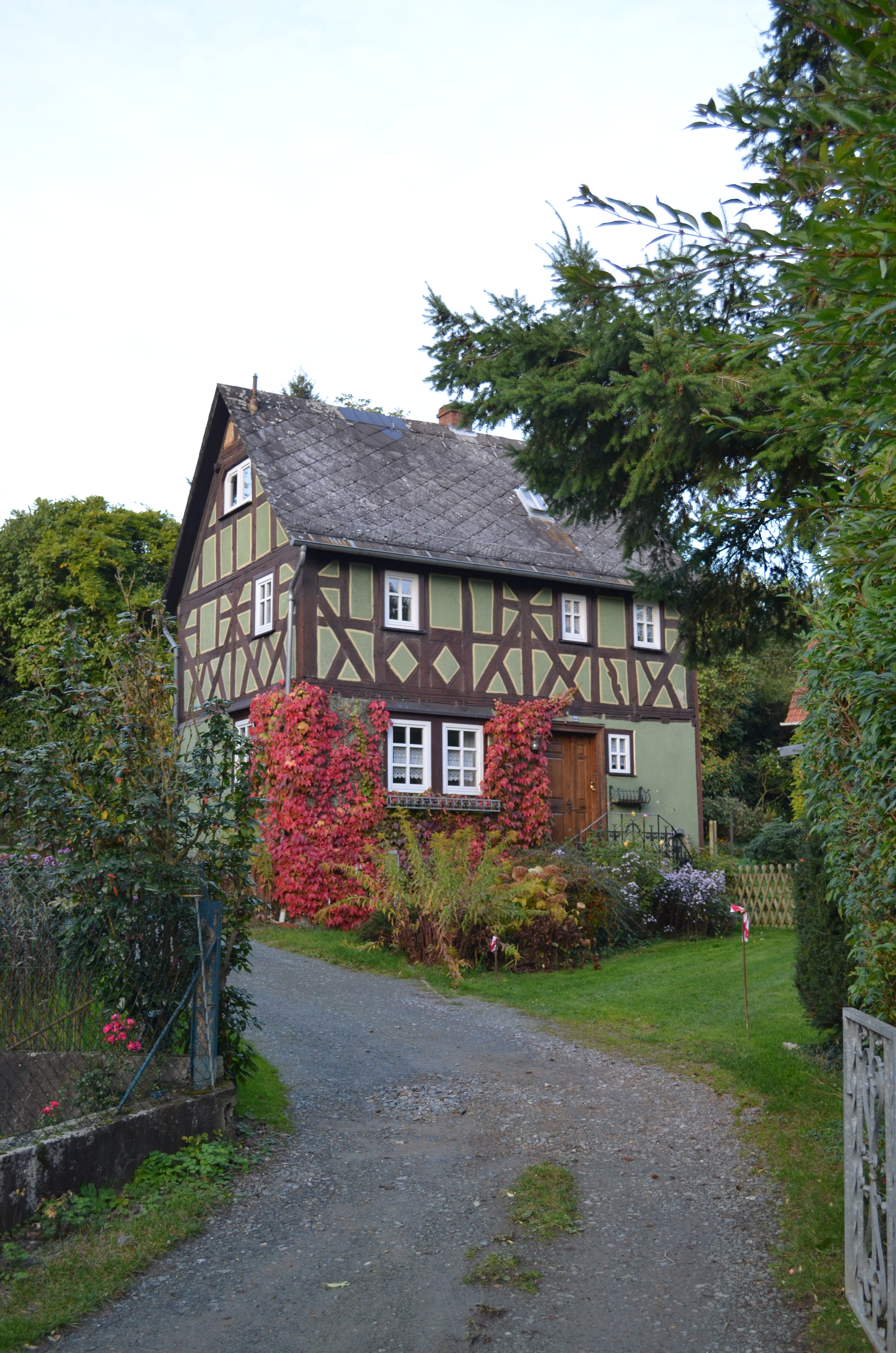
Old house in Grauensteinstraße

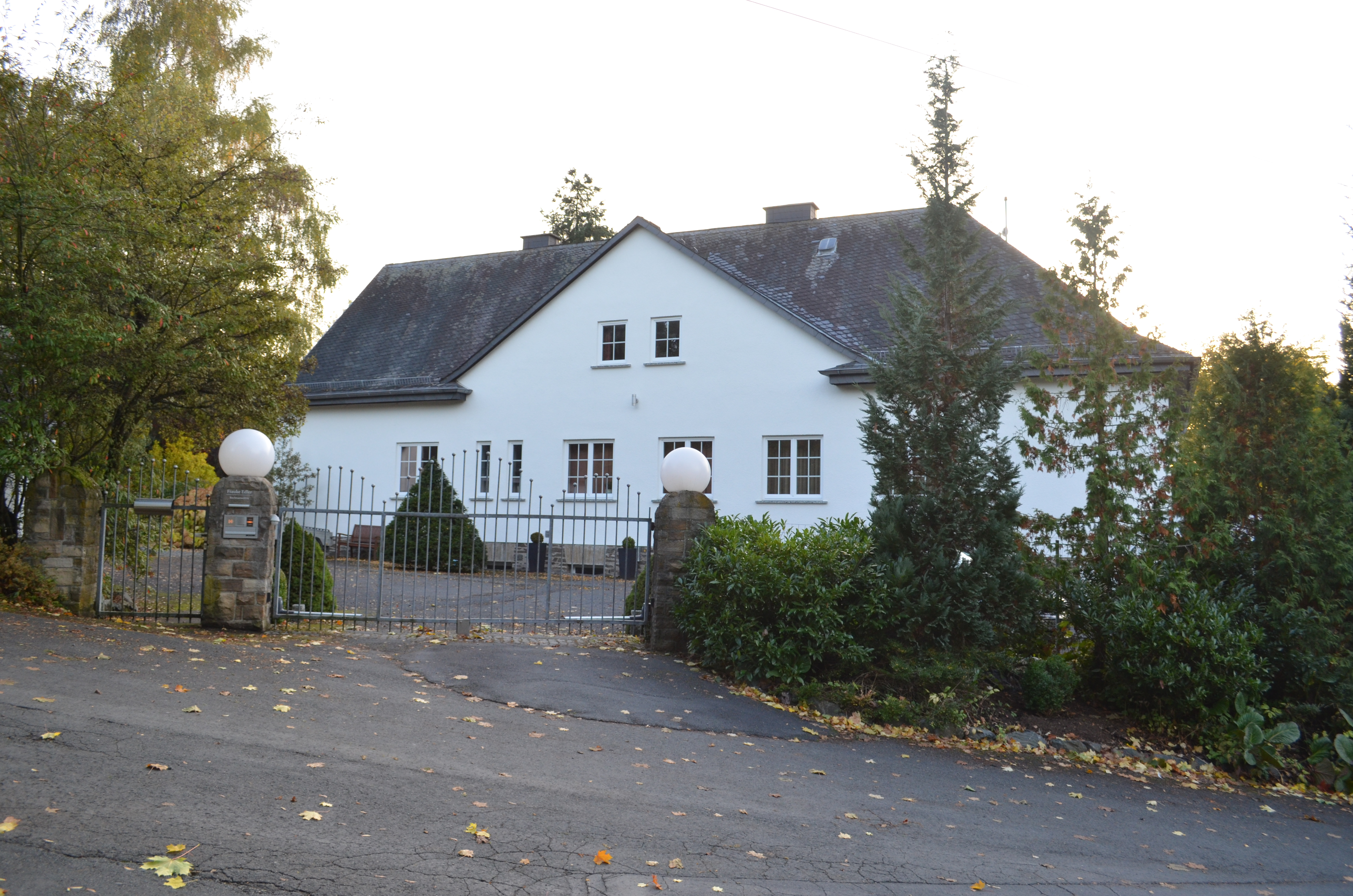
Old school building
