= Aulenhausen =

- Village of Weilmünster
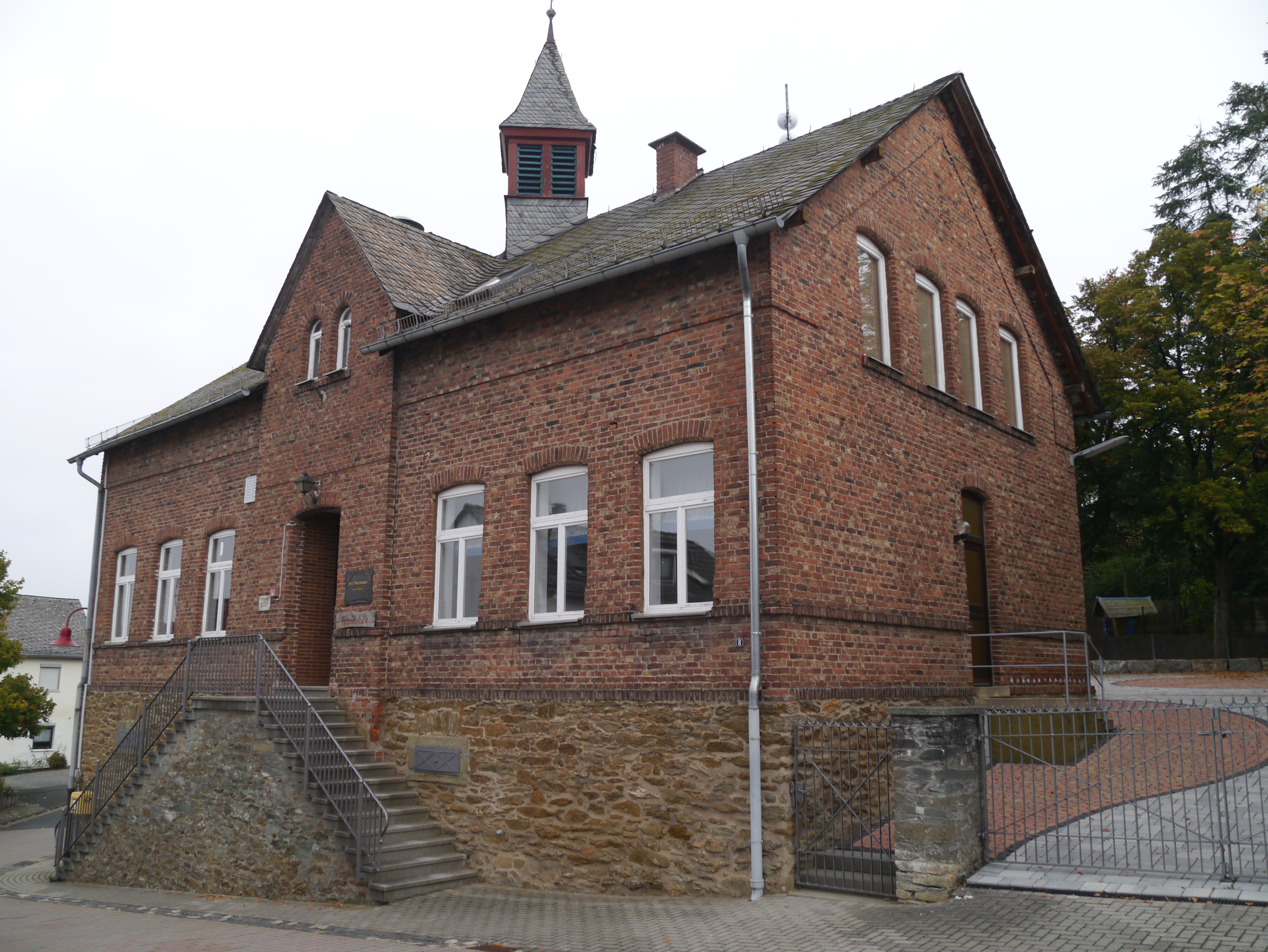
- Former town hall school
- Interactive map of Aulenhausen
- Location within Germany Location within Hesse
- Coordinates: 50°25′59″N 8°19′34″E
- Country: Germany
- State: Hesse
- City: Weilmünster

Area
  - Total: 2.94 km^{2} (1.14 sq mi)

Population (2021-06-30)
  - Total: 240
  - Density: 82/km^{2} (210/sq mi)
- Time zone: UTC+01:00 (CET)
  - Summer (DST): UTC+02:00 (CEST)
- Postal codes: 35789
- Vehicle registration: LM

Aulenhausen is a village (Ortsteil) of the municipality of Weilmünster in the district of Limburg-Weilburg in central Hesse. It has around 240 inhabitants (2021).

== Geography ==
The village is largely surrounded by forest in the eastern Hintertaunus, on a plateau between the Weinbachtal and Weiltal valleys and is part of the Taunus Nature Park. Aulenhausen is located 3.4 km west of the centre of Weilmünster. The district road 442 (Kreisstraße 442) runs through the village.

The district borders Essershausen and Ernsthausen to the north and Weilmünster to the east. Blessenbach and Elkerhausen (both districts of Weinbach) border it from the south and Weinbach centre to the west.

== History ==
The oldest known written mention of Aulenhausen was under the name Ulinhousen in 1333. Further mentions were made below the place names (the year of mention in brackets): Ulnhusen (1565), Ohlenhausen (1650), and Ahlenhausen (1740). The first school was built around 1700.

In the course of the territorial reform in Hesse, on 31 December 1970 the former market town of Weilmünster in the Oberlahn district merged voluntarily with the previously independent municipalities of Aulenhausen, Dietenhausen, Ernsthausen, Laimbach, Langenbach, Laubuseschbach, Lützendorf, Möttau, Rohnstadt and Wolfenhausen to form the new enlarged municipality of Weilmünster. Essershausen was added on 31 December 1971. Own districts were established for the former municipalities, and they are still represented politically with an own Ortsbeirat and Ortsvorsteher within the larger municipality.

== Demographics ==
According to the 2011 census, there were 231 inhabitants living in Aulenhausen on 9 May 2011. Of these, 3 (1.3%) were foreigners. In terms of age, 39 residents were under 18, 84 between 18 and 49, 66 between 50 and 64 and 42 residents were older. The residents lived in 105 households.

Year	Population
1834	214
1871	258
1905	241
1946	333
1970	247
2011	231
2021	240

== Sights ==
The only protected building is the former town hall school. It was built in 1888 to a design by the then building inspector as a simple gabled roof building on the corner facing Friedhofstraße.

== Community life ==
- Founded in 1934, the Aulenhausen volunteer fire brigade (with its youth fire brigade since 1 January 1992) provides fire protection in the village.
- There is a village community centre in Langenbergstraße, a sports field and hall with a sports club (KSG Aulenhausen), a children's playground and hiking trails.
