= Rohnstadt =

- Village of Weilmünster
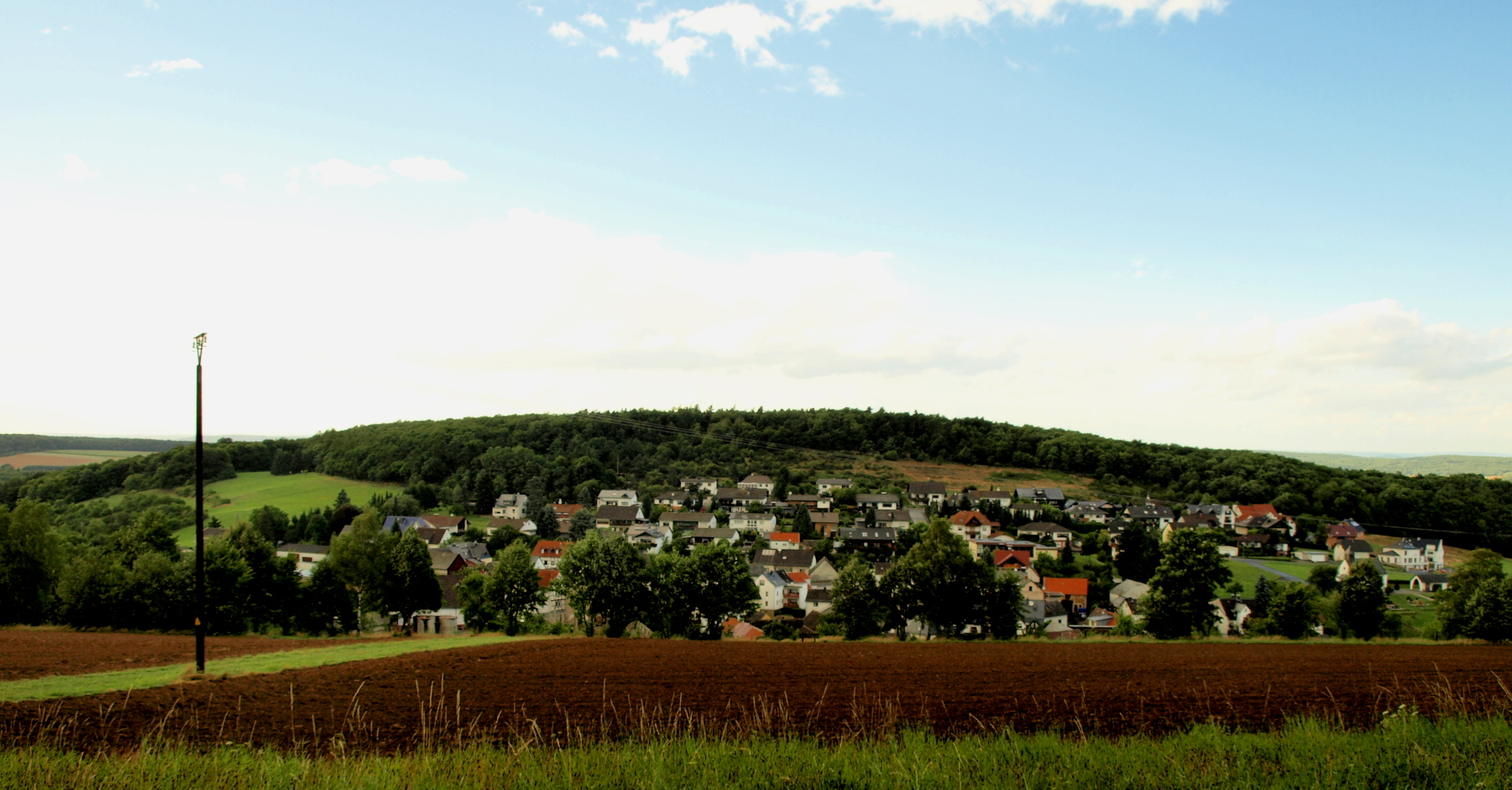
- Rohnstadt
- Interactive map of Rohnstadt
- Location within Germany Location within Hesse
- Coordinates: 50°24′22″N 8°21′37″E
- Country: Germany
- State: Hesse
- City: Weilmünster

Area
  - Total: 4.57 km^{2} (1.76 sq mi)

Population (2021-06-30)
  - Total: 261
  - Density: 57.1/km^{2} (148/sq mi)
- Time zone: UTC+01:00 (CET)
  - Summer (DST): UTC+02:00 (CEST)
- Postal codes: 35789
- Dialling codes: 06472
- Vehicle registration: LM

Rohnstadt is a village (Ortsteil) of the municipality of Weilmünster in the district of Limburg-Weilburg in central Hesse. It has around 260 inhabitants (2021).

== Geography ==
Rohnstadt is located in the eastern Hintertaunus, about three kilometers southwest of the Weilmünster core, embedded in a high hollow between the Hofwald, Hühnerküppel, Riesenkopf and Steinchen elevations in the Taunus Nature Park. The highest elevation in the district is the Hühnerküppel at 369 m above sea level. Neighboring towns are Laubuseschbach (west), Weilmünster (north) and Langenbach (southeast).

== History ==
Celtic fortifications (ring walls) on the Riesenkopf, the Riesenburg, and on the Hühnerkuppel indicate an older settlement in this area. Archaeological finds allow a classification into the late Hallstatt period or the early and late La Tène period. A prehistoric long-distance route, the so-called Hessenstrasse (also called Hünerstrasse), which connected the Rhineland with northern Hesse, used to take its course here.

The first documented mention of Rohnstadt comes from 1335, when Richwin von Elkerhausen sold his farm in Ramßhart (Rohnstadt) to his nephew Hiltwin von Elkerhausen and his wife Christine. In surviving documents from later years, the place was mentioned under the following place names (each with the year of mention): Ramshart (1408), Ransert (1495), Ranschart/Ronschart (1531), Ransshart (1538), Ranshart (1653), Ronstatt (1662), Rohnstatt (1740) and since 1824 Rohnstadt.

The oldest mine in the Oberlahn area, the Mehlbach silver, copper and lead mine, is mentioned in a document from 1495. This mine, located in the Rohnstadt district, probably only had its greatest yield in the years after 1750. The success was so great that it was celebrated by minting three so-called Ausbeutethaler. Several hundred miners earned their daily bread here. A school was even set up specifically for the children of them. Slate mining was carried out in numerous tunnels and pits in the area. Mining continued until the early 20th century.

On May 15, 1892, the Weilmünster–Laubuseschbach railway line was opened, on which Rohnstadt had an intermediate station at the Spitzemühle, far away from town. It was mainly used to transport goods, especially mined iron ore. The railway line was later shut down. The village was electrified in 1921. Around the same time, a central water supply was ensured.

In the course of the territorial reform in Hesse, on 31 December 1970 the former market town of Weilmünster in the Oberlahn district merged voluntarily with the previously independent municipalities of Aulenhausen, Dietenhausen, Ernsthausen, Laimbach, Langenbach, Laubuseschbach, Lützendorf, Möttau, Rohnstadt and Wolfenhausen to form the new enlarged municipality of Weilmünster. Essershausen was added on 31 December 1971. Own districts were established for the former municipalities, and they are still represented politically with an own Ortsbeirat and Ortsvorsteher within the larger municipality.

Agriculture and mining were the only source of income in the town for centuries. Today, Rohnstadt, like many places in the neighborhood, has developed into a commuter village in the Frankfurt Rhine-Main metropolitan area. Not part of the immediate Frankfurt urban area, it could mostly retain its traditional character.

== Demographics ==
According to the 2011 census, 282 residents lived in Rohnstadt on May 9, 2011. Of these, 9 (3.2%) were foreigners. In terms of age, 42 residents were under 18 years old, 102 were between 18 and 49, 75 were between 50 and 64 and 66 residents were older. The residents lived in 120 households.

Year	Population
1630	12 households
1825	169
1852	221
1871	215
1905	258
1946	312
1970	257
2001	303
2011	282
2021	261

== Sights ==
The Rohnstädter Backhaus, known as Backes in the village, is the landmark of Rohnstadt. It was built in 1927. Until 1970, the Rohnstadt municipal administration (town hall) was housed on the upper floor.

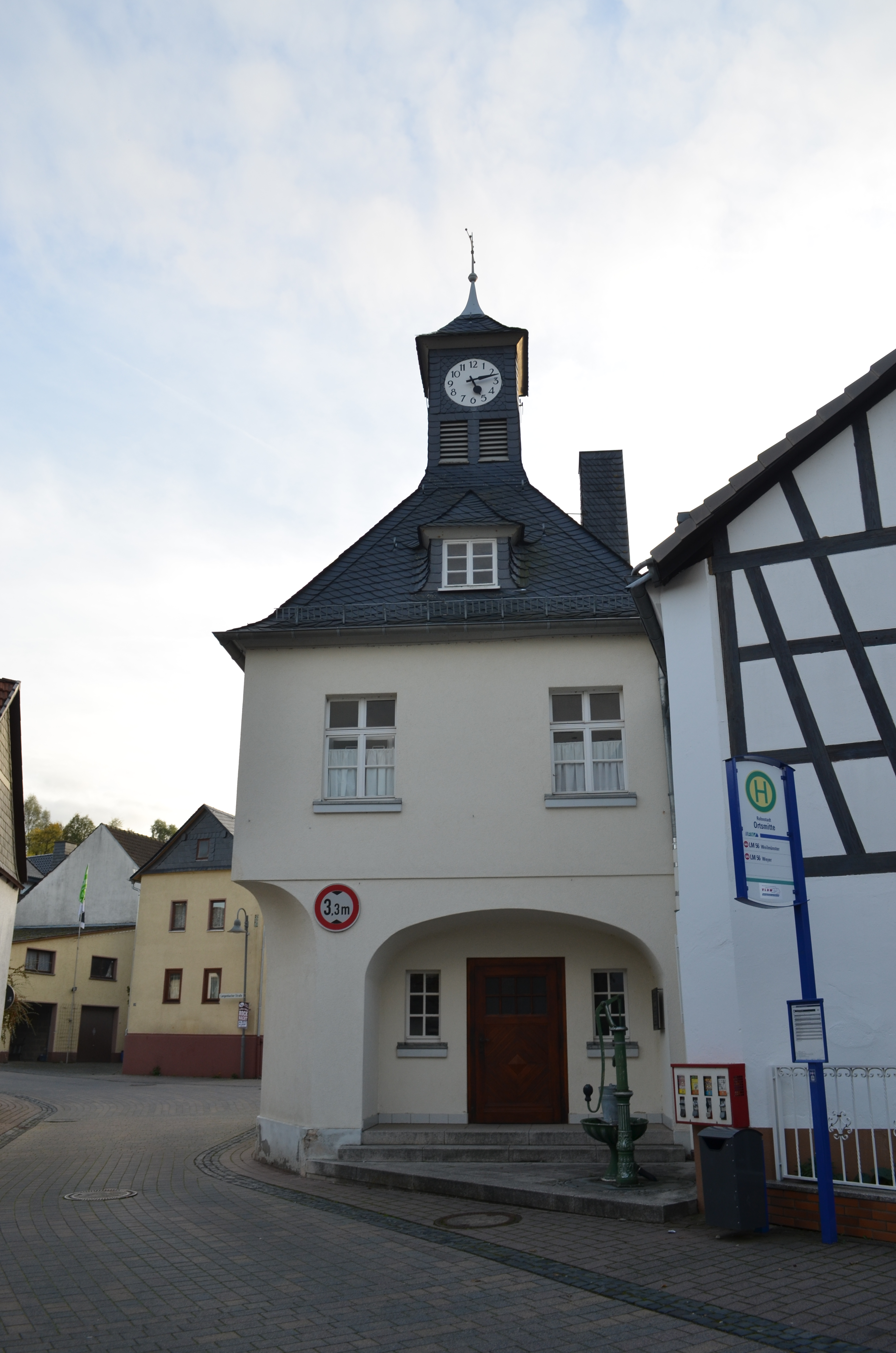
Backhaus and former town hall

== Community life ==
The village community center was inaugurated in 1972. The village also has a youth center. There are also local heritage-, sports- and music clubs. Since 1934, the Rohnstadt Volunteer Fire Department (with a youth fire department since January 9, 1999) has been providing fire protection for residents.
