= Möttau =

- Village of Weilmünster
- Interactive map of Möttau
- Location within Germany Location within Hesse
- Coordinates: 50°27′12″N 8°23′58″E
- Country: Germany
- State: Hesse
- City: Weilmünster

Area
  - Total: 4.48 km^{2} (1.73 sq mi)

Population (2021-06-30)
  - Total: 332
  - Density: 74.1/km^{2} (192/sq mi)
- Time zone: UTC+01:00 (CET)
  - Summer (DST): UTC+02:00 (CEST)
- Postal codes: 35789
- Dialling codes: 06472
- Vehicle registration: LM

Möttau is a village (Ortsteil) of the municipality of Weilmünster in the district of Limburg-Weilburg in central Hesse. It has around 300 inhabitants (2021).

== Geography ==
Möttau is located in the eastern Hintertaunus, northeast of the core town of Weilmünster and directly on the district border with the Lahn-Dill district. The Möttbach rises in the village and flows on to Philippstein. In addition, the Iserbach, coming from Dietenhausen, flows into the Möttbach here. Together they form a valley that runs north–south and in which Möttau is located. The district also includes a very large forest area. The highest elevations near Möttau are the Hirschberg at 333 meters above sea level and the Buhlenberg at 363 meters above sea level.

Neighboring towns are Weilmünster (southwest), Altenkirchen (north), Kraftsolms (east), and Dietenhausen (southeast).

== History ==
The place is mentioned for the first time in a donation deed from the Codex Eberhardi in the Fulda monastery. The exact date is unknown, but the document must have been issued between 779 and 802. The document states that Frederick gave the Mitie estate (Möttau) to St. Boniface. In 912, King Conrad I pledged, among other things, his lands in Mitiu to the Fulda monastery.

Since 1317, Isenmitte (1337) has belonged to the County of Weilnau. It was pledged to the provost of Gemünden on June 23, 1326, and fell to Count Gerlach of Nassau in November of the same year. He had Grebenhausen Castle, a moated castle, built near Möttau. It was intended to serve as a border castle to the county of Solms. In 1405 the village came to Philip I of Nassau-Saarbrücken through an inheritance purchase. At that time there was already a chapel in the village that belonged to the parish of Altenkirchen. In 1450 Möttau came to the Weilmünster manor and moved to the parish of the same name.

During the Thirty Years' War the place was partially devastated. The reason was the direct location on two trade routes, Hessenstrasse and Frankfurter Weg.

In the course of the territorial reform in Hesse, on 31 December 1970 the former market town of Weilmünster in the Oberlahn district merged voluntarily with the previously independent municipalities of Aulenhausen, Dietenhausen, Ernsthausen, Laimbach, Langenbach, Laubuseschbach, Lützendorf, Möttau, Rohnstadt and Wolfenhausen to form the new enlarged municipality of Weilmünster. Essershausen was added on 31 December 1971. Own districts were established for the former municipalities, and they are still represented politically with an own Ortsbeirat and Ortsvorsteher within the larger municipality.

== Demographics ==
According to the 2011 census, there were 372 residents living in Möttau on May 9, 2011. Of these, 3 (0.8%) were foreigners. In terms of age, 51 residents were under 18 years old, 108 were between 18 and 49, 81 were between 50 and 64 and 132 residents were older. The residents lived in 135 households.

Year	Population
1630	12 households
1825	127
1852	156
1871	148
1905	149
1946	242
1970	224
2001	359
2011	372
2021	332

== Sights ==
- Former town hall
- Old school building
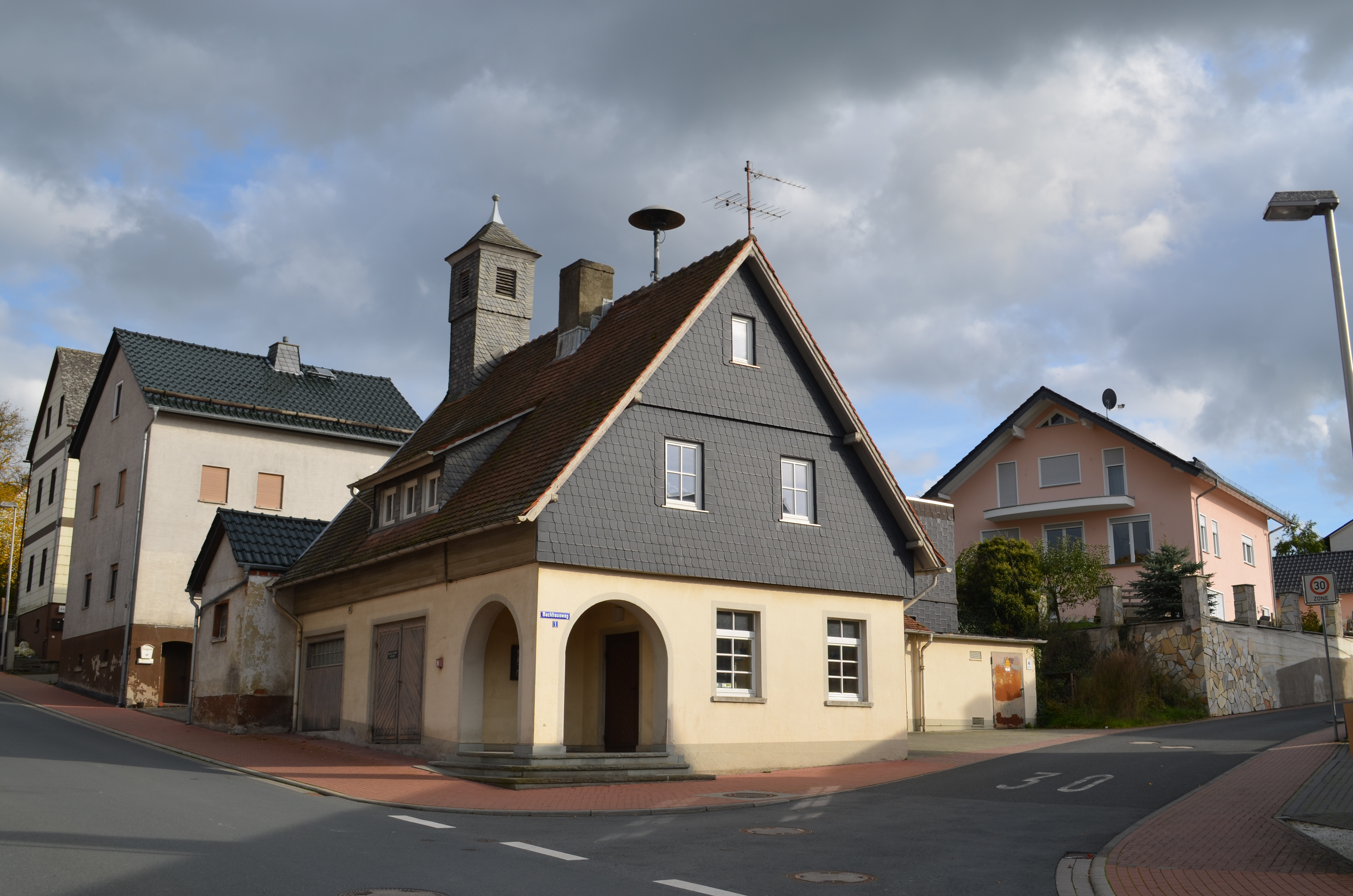
Former town hall

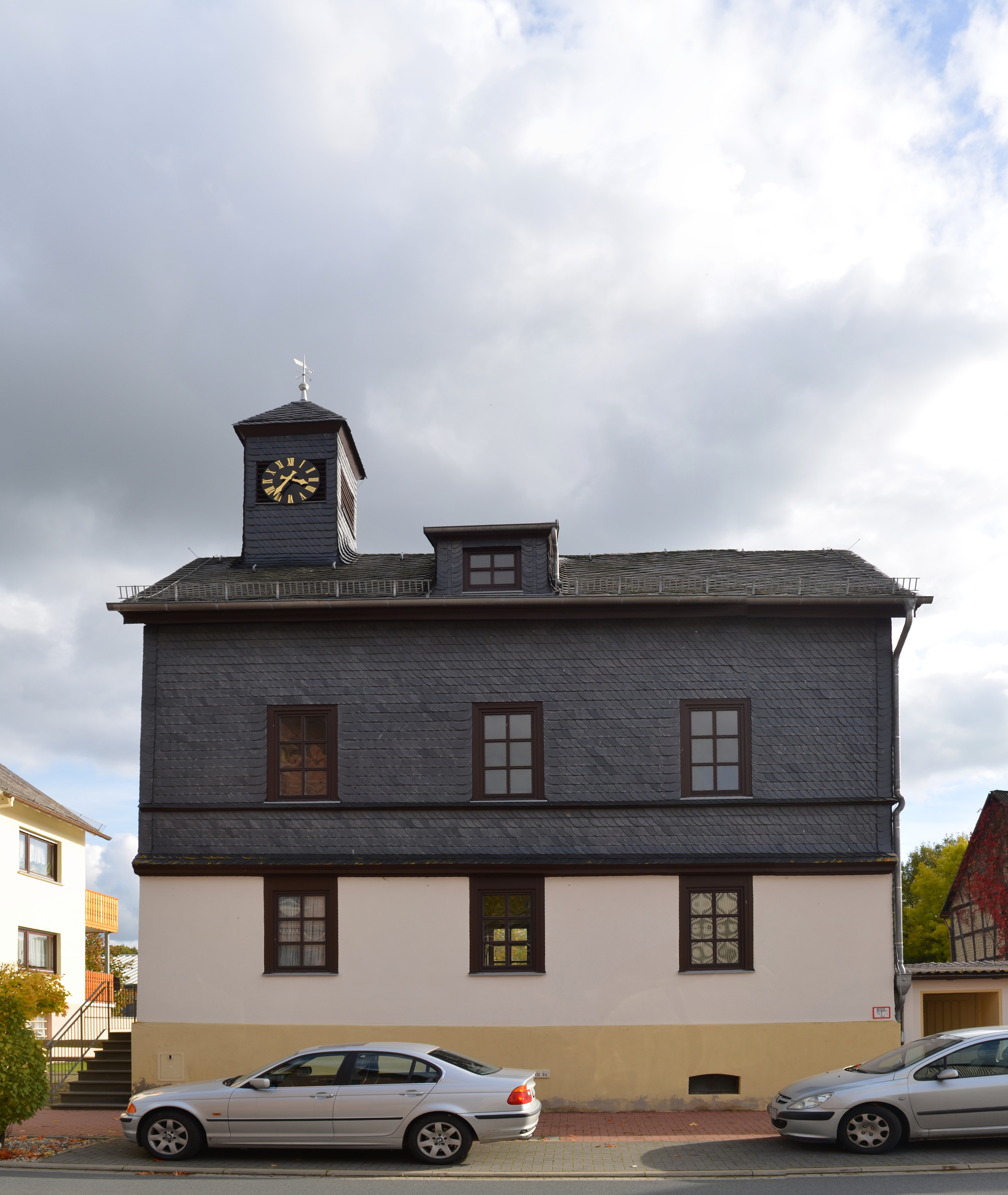
Old school building
