= Dietenhausen =

- Village of Weilmünster
- Interactive map of Dietenhausen
- Location within Germany Location within Hesse
- Coordinates: 50°25′23″N 8°25′44″E
- Country: Germany
- State: Hesse
- Municipality: Weilmünster

Area
  - Total: 4.81 km^{2} (1.86 sq mi)

Population (2021-06-30)
  - Total: 407
  - Density: 84.6/km^{2} (219/sq mi)
- Time zone: UTC+01:00 (CET)
  - Summer (DST): UTC+02:00 (CEST)
- Postal codes: 35789
- Dialling codes: 06472
- Vehicle registration: LM

Dietenhausen is a village (Ortsteil) of the municipality of Weilmünster in the district of Limburg-Weilburg in central Hesse. It has around 400 inhabitants (2021).

== Geography ==
The village is located in the eastern Hintertaunus in the Taunus Nature Park, at an altitude of 340 meters above sea level, southeast of the town core of Weilmünster. The Iserbach rises southeast of the village and flows on to Möttau, forming a valley in which the towns are located. The highest elevations near Dietenhausen are the Heiligenwald at 415 meters above sea level and the Heidenkopf at 405 meters above sea level.

Neighboring towns are Weilmünster (west), Möttau (northwest), Brandoberndorf (northeast), Hasselborn (east) and Grävenwiesbach (southeast).

== History ==
As far as is known, the place was first mentioned in a document in 1301 as Didenhusen. In surviving documents from later years, the place also was mentioned under the following place names (the year of mention in brackets): Dydenhusen (1318) and Diedenhaugen (1627). However, Dietenhausen must have been settled long before it was first mentioned. This is indicated by the burial mounds in the nearby forests. An old Hellweg and the Celtic Wellerstrasse intersect near the village. The settlement of the area has therefore probably already taken place in the Celtic or pre-Celtic period.

Count Gerlach of Nassau bought the village, as well as other properties such as nearby Möttau, from the Counts of Solms in 1335. For protection, he built Grebenhausen Castle in the forest between Dietenhausen and Möttau. His son John I, Count of Nassau-Weilburg gifted some of the local forest to the neighboring village of Weilmünster in 1350. For centuries, Dietenhausen remained a farming village. In addition to farming, the residents also did iron smelting in the surrounding forests.

In the course of the territorial reform in Hesse, on 31 December 1970 the former market town of Weilmünster in the Oberlahn district merged voluntarily with the previously independent municipalities of Aulenhausen, Dietenhausen, Ernsthausen, Laimbach, Langenbach, Laubuseschbach, Lützendorf, Möttau, Rohnstadt and Wolfenhausen to form the new enlarged municipality of Weilmünster. Essershausen was added on 31 December 1971. Own districts were established for the former municipalities, and they are still represented politically with an own Ortsbeirat and Ortsvorsteher within the larger municipality.

== Demographics ==
According to the 2011 census, 444 residents lived in Dietenhausen on May 9, 2011. Of these, 3 (0.7%) were foreigners. In terms of age, 60 residents were under 18 years old, 207 were between 18 and 49, 108 were between 50 and 64 and 69 residents were older. The residents lived in 186 households.

| Year | Population |
|---|---|
| 1825 | 235 |
| 1852 | 333 |
| 1871 | 304 |
| 1905 | 269 |
| 1946 | 409 |
| 1970 | 373 |
| 2011 | 444 |
| 2021 | 407 |

== Sights ==
The village has a Protestant church and a number of older and historic buildings.

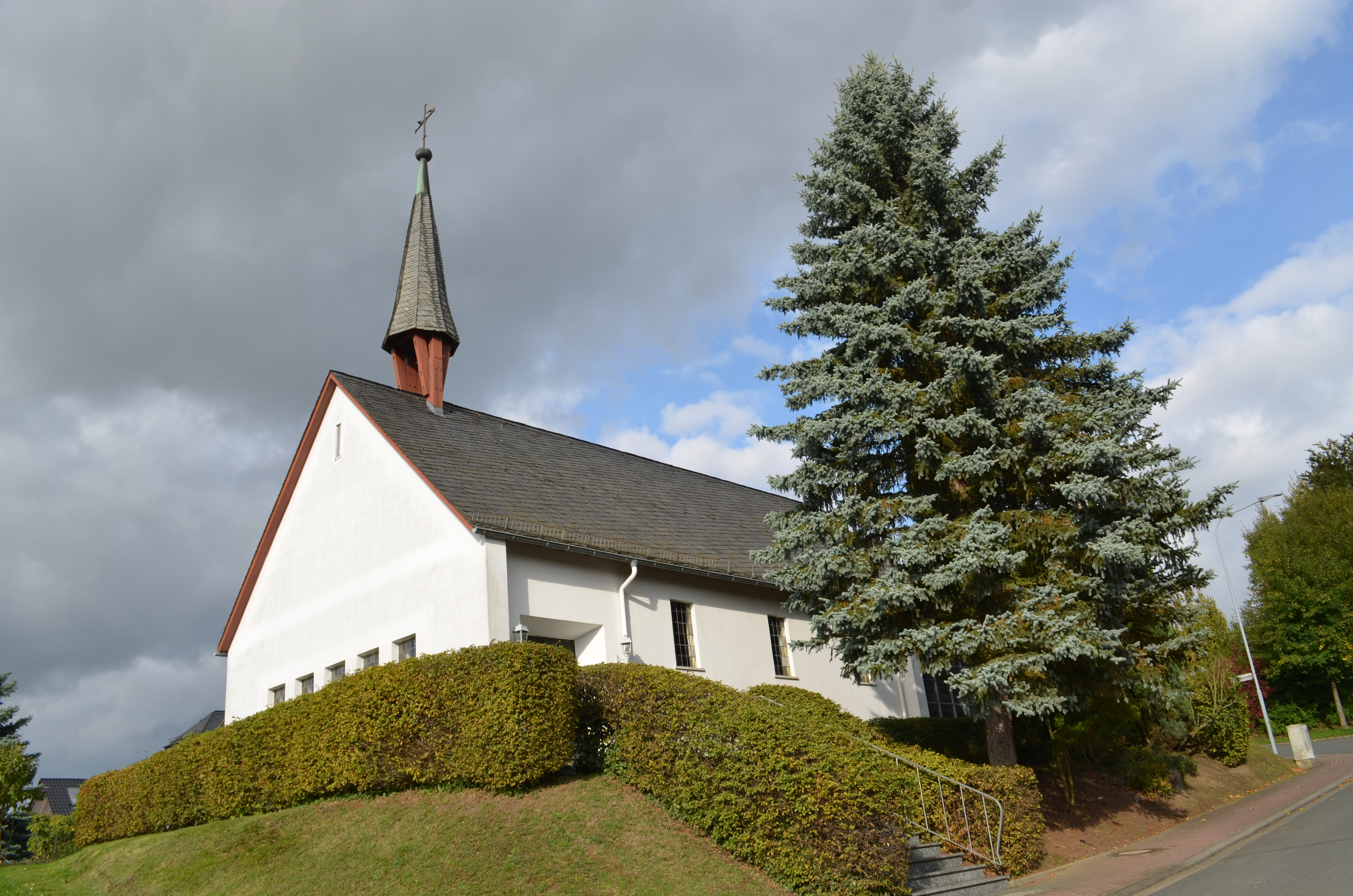
Dietenhausen church

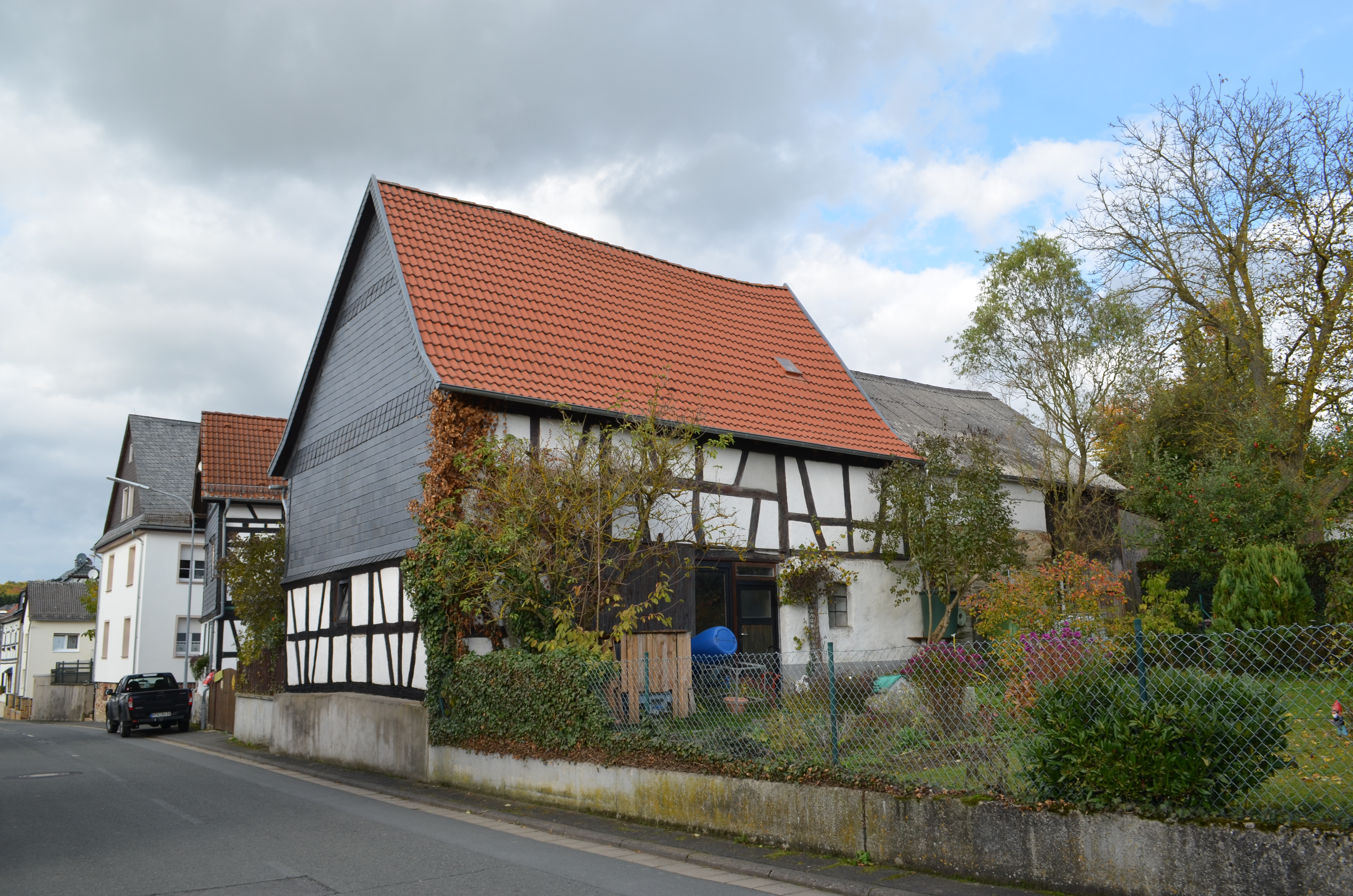
Old barn in Iserbachstraße

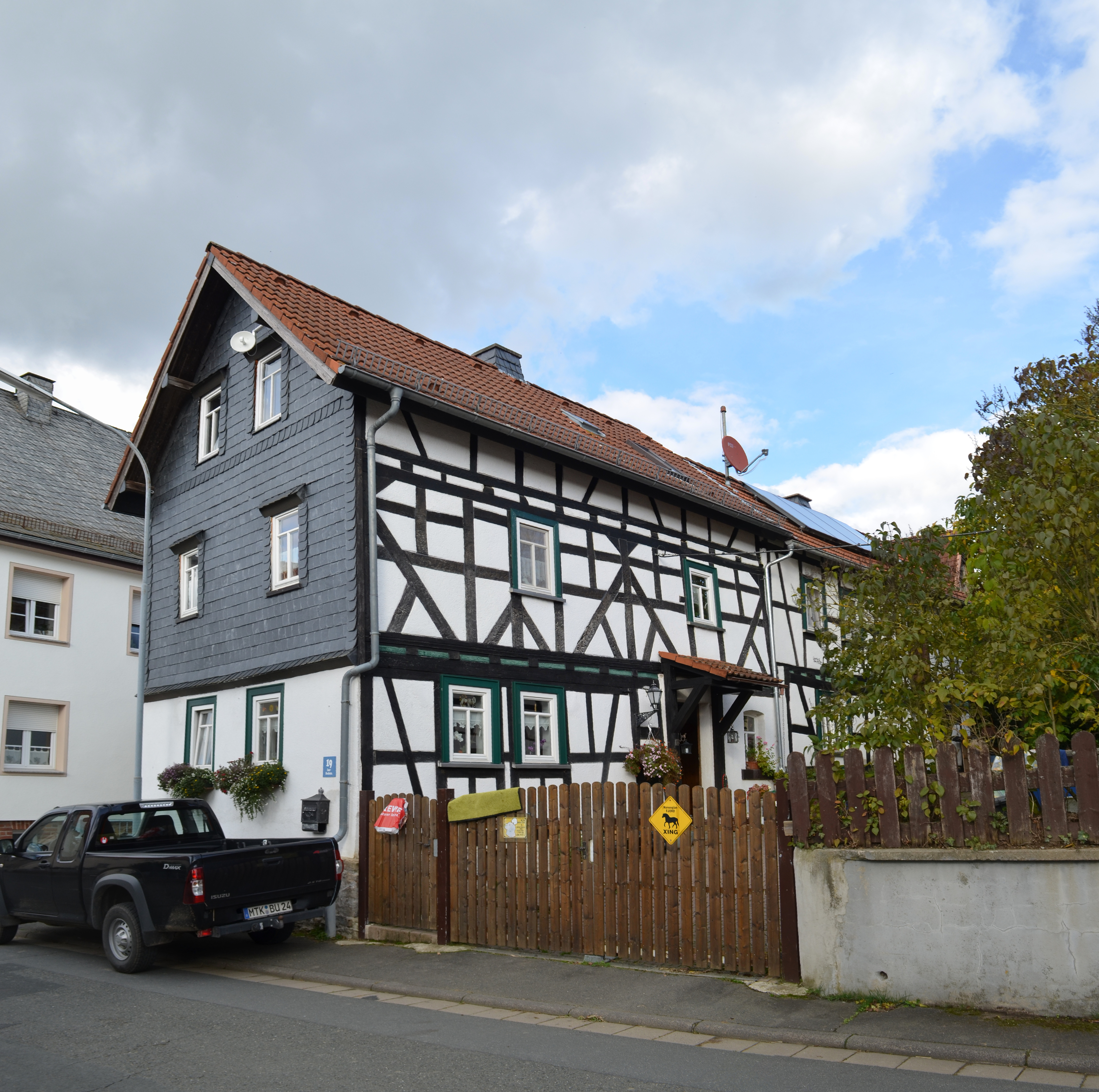
Old courtyard in Iserbachstraße

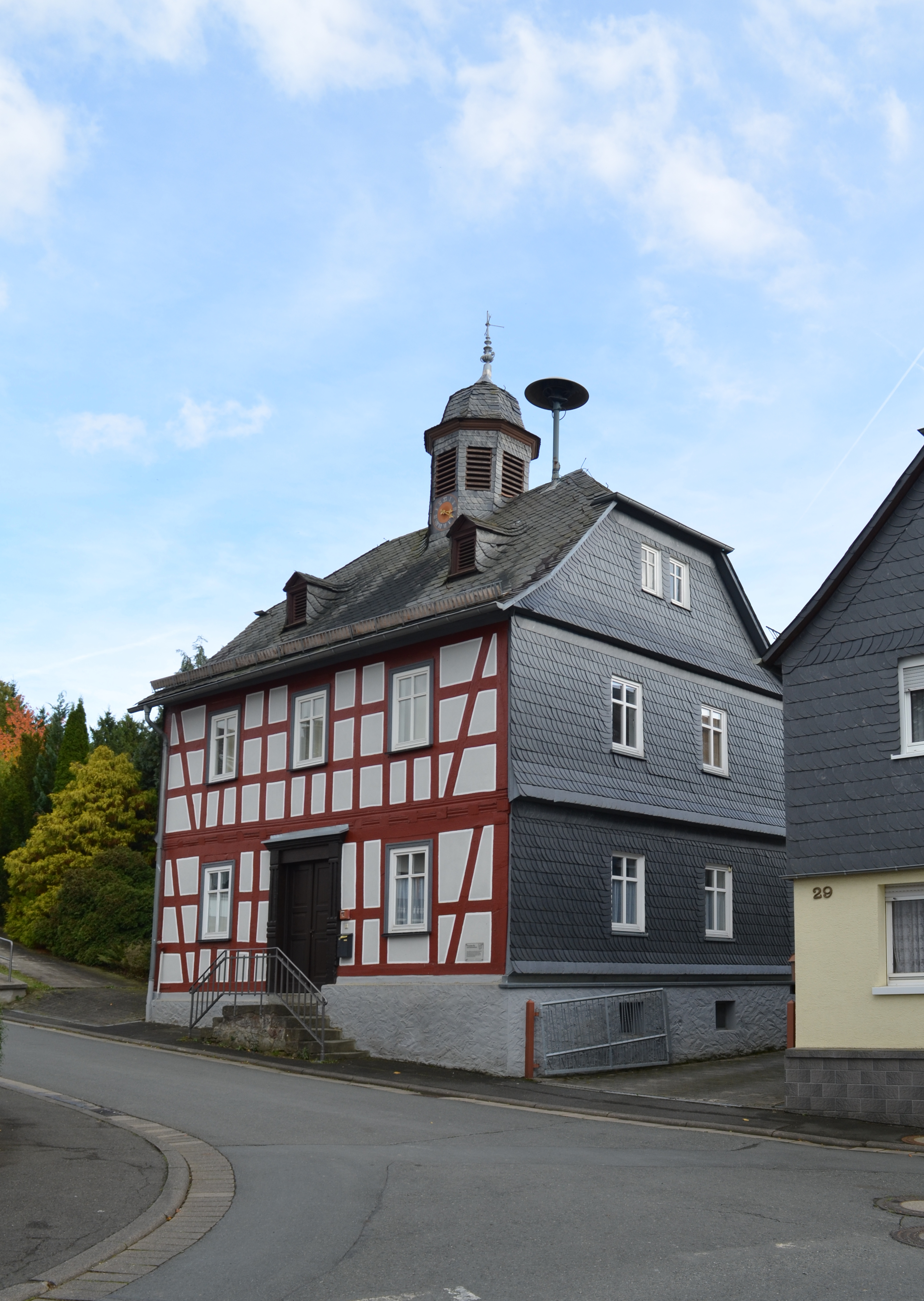
Old town hall

== Community life ==
There is the village community center on Lindenstrasse, a sports field, a children's playground and hiking trails. There is also a sports club, a music club and a carnival club in the village. Since 1934, the Dietenhausen Volunteer Fire Department (since February 27, 1996 with a youth and since April 2, 2011 with a children's department) has been providing fire protection and general help for locals.
