= Ernsthausen =

- Village of Weilmünster
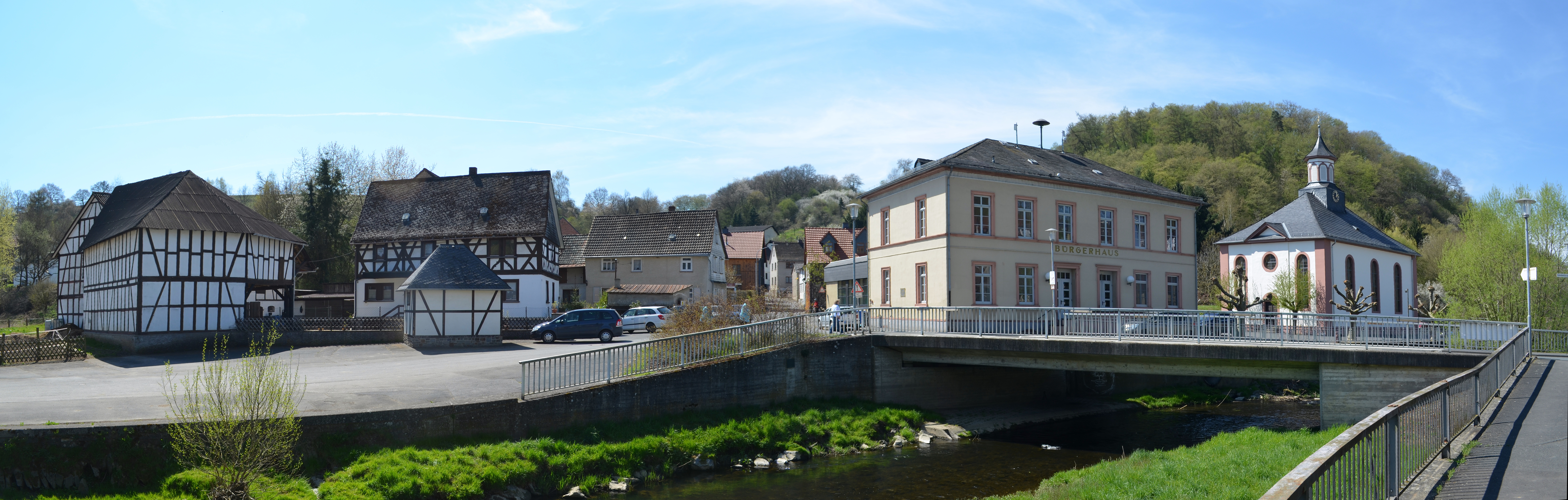
- Ernsthausen
- Interactive map of Ernsthausen
- Location within Germany Location within Hesse
- Coordinates: 50°27′13″N 8°21′4″E
- Country: Germany
- State: Hesse
- City: Weilmünster

Area
  - Total: 6.98 km^{2} (2.69 sq mi)

Population (2021-06-30)
  - Total: 563
  - Density: 80.7/km^{2} (209/sq mi)
- Time zone: UTC+01:00 (CET)
  - Summer (DST): UTC+02:00 (CEST)
- Postal codes: 35789
- Dialling codes: 06472
- Vehicle registration: LM

Ernsthausen is a village (Ortsteil) of the municipality of Weilmünster in the district of Limburg-Weilburg in central Hesse. It has around 600 inhabitants (2021).

== Geography ==
The village is located in the district of Limburg-Weilburg in central Hesse, north of Frankfurt am Main and close to Weilburg. As Ernsthausen was part of the former Oberlahnkreis until the creation of the district of Limburg-Weilburg in July 1974, it was also referred to as Ernsthausen (Oberlahnkreis). Located in the eastern Hintertaunus and thus in the Taunus Nature Park, Ernsthausen is crossed by the Weil, a tributary of the Lahn.

== History ==
Ernsthausen was mentioned in surviving documents under the following place names (the year of mention in brackets): Ernistishusen (1308), Ernsthusen (1330), Erneshusen (1391) and Ernshusen (1540). The oldest known documentary reference dates back to 1308, but it can be assumed that the village of Ernsthausen existed already several centuries earlier. According to legends, the old Ernsthausen was built to protect against the heavy floods of the Weil in the higher-lying Urschlag. It is not certain whether this settlement was completely destroyed by a major fire in the Middle Ages or by devastation during the Thirty Years' War, so that no traces of it remain. The village was rebuilt further downstream and expanded on both sides of the Weil. The village centre was probably located in the area of today's bridge over the Weil.

In the early years, Ernsthausen, like the entire lower Weiltal valley, belonged to the County of Diez. The county was later divided and Ernsthausen became part of the county of Diez-Weilburg and the new manorial court and later the Weilmünster Amt. According to a document dating from 1310, the canonry of St Walpurgis in Weilburg was granted the right to collect the grain yields (taxes) from Ernsthausen. In 1391, Bishop Ekkard of Worms enfeoffed the knight Konrad von Essershausen with the tithe of Ernsthausen. In 1724, Count Karl August von Nassau-Weilburg acquired these rights by purchase, so that from then on the Ernsthäuser were liable to pay taxes to Weilburg.

As in the neighbouring communities, the inhabitants of Ernsthausen were mostly small farmers. As their income was low, they tried to improve their income as charcoal burners or as iron workers, who worked in hand or pedal ironworks to extract iron. At the end of the 17th century, when the local mining industry experienced a great boom, the population of Ernsthausen also increased. Ernsthausen gradually became the most important place in the Weilmünster area, alongside Weilmünster itself.

Ernsthausen used to have a railway station on the Weiltalbahn. The railway line was built in 1889 and later dismantled, after passenger transport had already been discontinued in 1969 and freight transport had become unprofitable.

In the course of the territorial reform in Hesse, on 31 December 1970 the former market town of Weilmünster in the Oberlahn district merged voluntarily with the previously independent municipalities of Aulenhausen, Dietenhausen, Ernsthausen, Laimbach, Langenbach, Laubuseschbach, Lützendorf, Möttau, Rohnstadt and Wolfenhausen to form the new enlarged municipality of Weilmünster. Essershausen was added on 31 December 1971. Own districts were established for the former municipalities, and they are still represented politically with an own Ortsbeirat and Ortsvorsteher within the larger municipality.

== Demographics ==
According to the 2011 census, there were 561 inhabitants living in Ernsthausen on 9 May 2011. Of these, 12 (2.1 %) were foreigners. In terms of age, 90 residents were under 18 years old, 210 between 18 and 49, 153 between 50 and 64 and 105 residents were older. The residents lived in 246 households.

Year	Population
1825	356
1834	416
1871	450
1905	493
1946	688
1970	603
2011	561
2021	563

== Sights ==
=== Church ===
In the 1920s, the church built in 1766 burnt down and had to be completely demolished. A new Ernsthausen Church was consecrated in 1832.

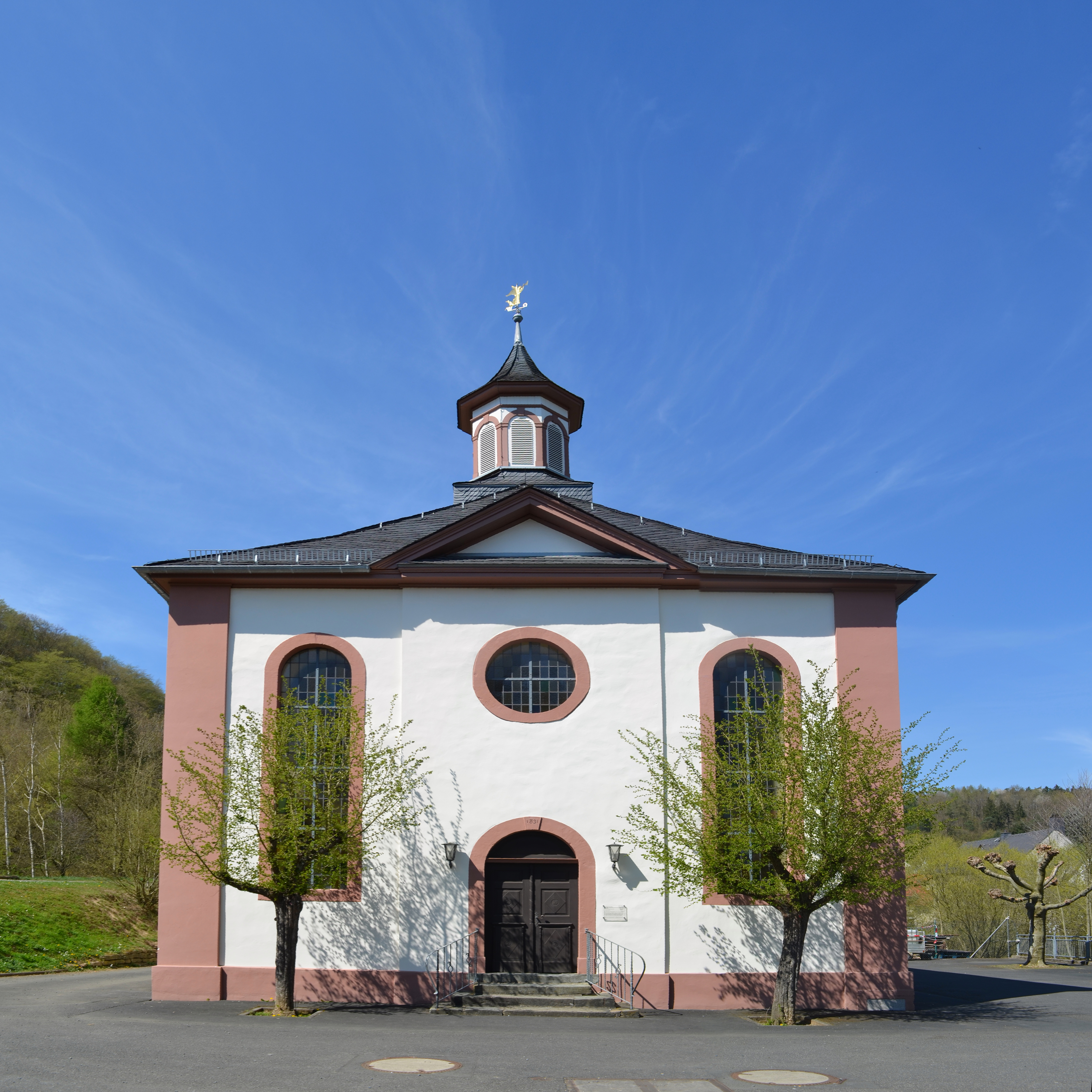
Ernsthausen Church

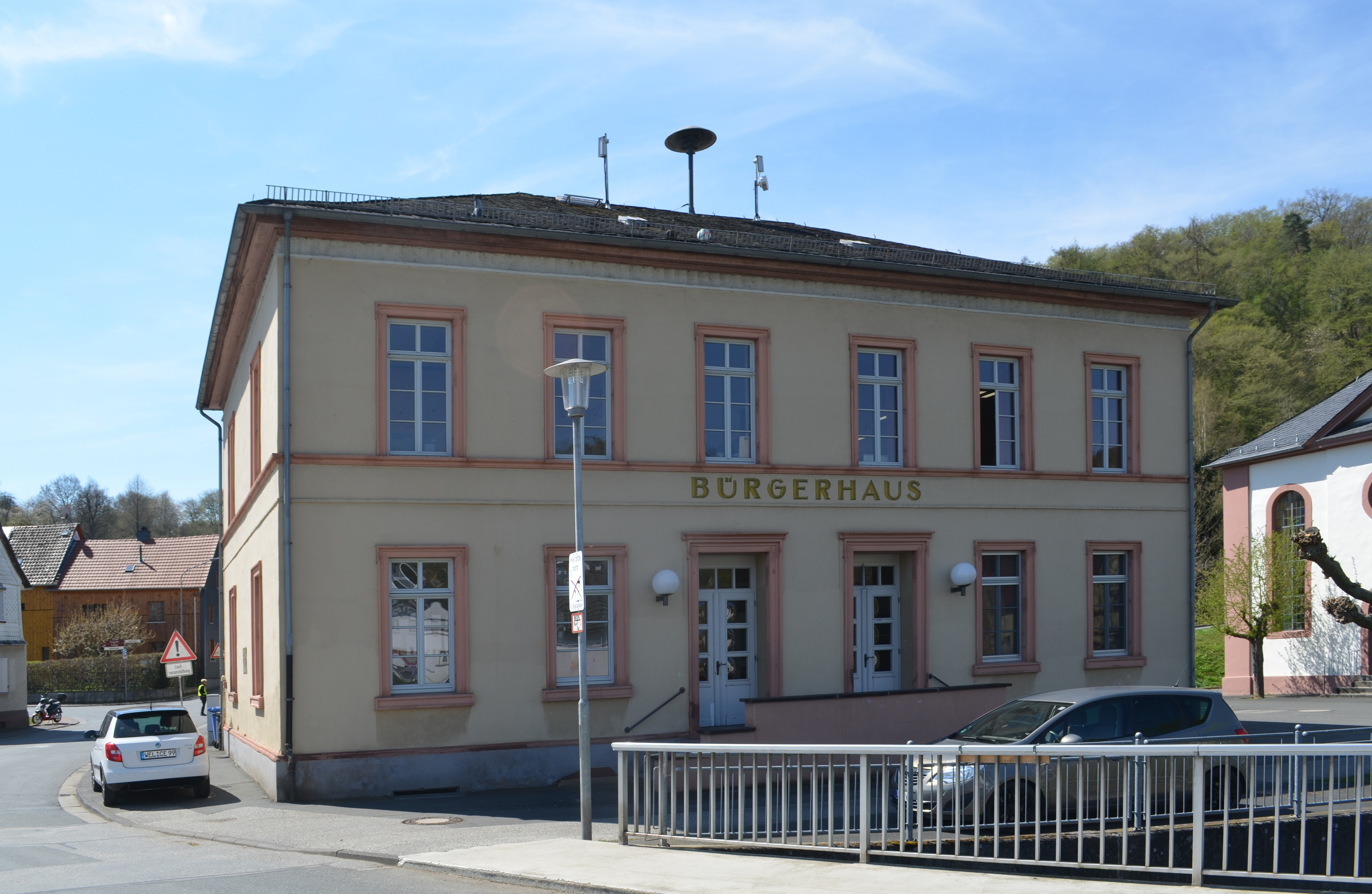
Village community centre, formerly a school

== Community life ==
There is a village community centre in Bahnhofsstraße, a Kindergarten, a sports field and hiking and biking trails. There are different cultural associations and clubs, like the sports club SG 1970 Weiltal. Founded in 1924, the Ernsthausen volunteer fire brigade (with its youth fire brigade since 1990) provides fire protection in the village.
