= Lützendorf =

- Village of Weilmünster
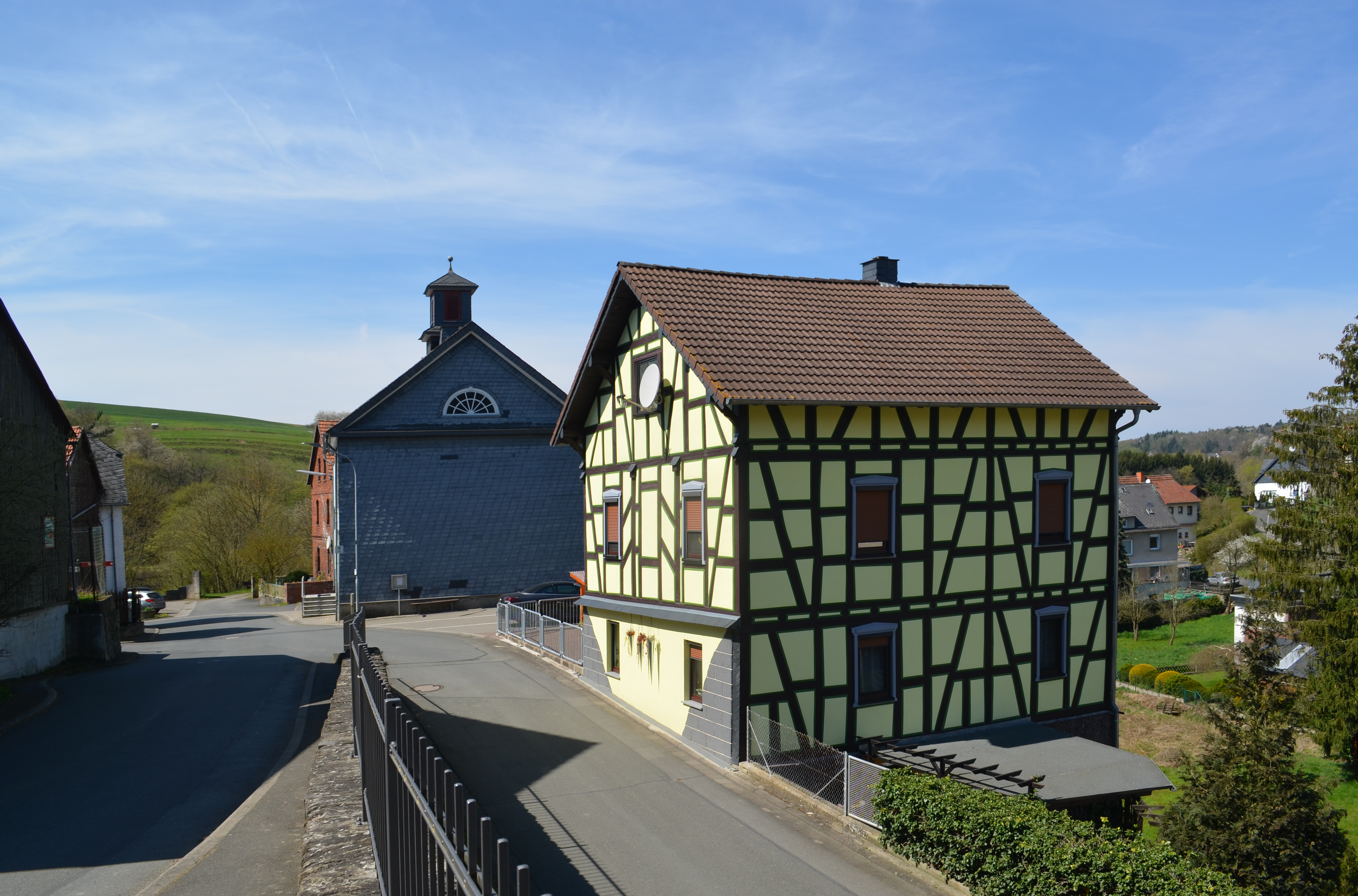
- Interactive map of Lützendorf
- Location within Germany Location within Hesse
- Coordinates: 50°26′41″N 8°21′59″E
- Country: Germany
- State: Hesse
- Municipality: Weilmünster

Area
  - Total: 2.34 km^{2} (0.90 sq mi)

Population (2021-06-30)
  - Total: 184
  - Density: 78.6/km^{2} (204/sq mi)
- Time zone: UTC+01:00 (CET)
  - Summer (DST): UTC+02:00 (CEST)
- Postal codes: 35789
- Dialling codes: 06472
- Vehicle registration: LM

Lützendorf is a village (Ortsteil) of the municipality of Weilmünster in the district of Limburg-Weilburg in central Hesse. It has around 200 inhabitants (2021).

== History ==
In surviving documents, Lützendorf was mentioned under the following place names (the year of mention in brackets): Luzelendorf (1234), Lutzillindorf (1292), Lutzelendorf (1320), Lutzilndorf (1330) and Lietzendorff (1630).

The village was first mentioned in documents in 1234. The main part of the place was a farm that belonged to the monastery in Dietkirchen. In 1620 the Lords of Schwalbach and in 1690 the Lords of Grünstein were the feudal successors to the Knights of Essershausen. With the knightly possession of Essershausen, the place came to Count Charles August, Prince of Nassau-Weilburg in 1724. The farm was closed, and the fields were distributed among several farmers.

Lützendorf had a stop on the Weiltalbahn. The railway line was built in 1889 and dismantled in 1990 after passenger traffic had stopped in 1969.

In the course of the territorial reform in Hesse, on 31 December 1970 the former market town of Weilmünster in the Oberlahn district merged voluntarily with the previously independent municipalities of Aulenhausen, Dietenhausen, Ernsthausen, Laimbach, Langenbach, Laubuseschbach, Lützendorf, Möttau, Rohnstadt and Wolfenhausen to form the new enlarged municipality of Weilmünster. Essershausen was added on 31 December 1971. Own districts were established for the former municipalities, and they are still represented politically with an own Ortsbeirat and Ortsvorsteher within the larger municipality.

== Demographics ==
According to the 2011 census, 195 residents lived in Lützendorf on May 9, 2011. Of these, 6 (3.1%) were foreigners. In terms of age, 39 residents were under 18 years old, 72 were between 18 and 49, 39 were between 50 and 64 and 45 residents were older. The residents lived in 81 households.

| Year | Population |
|---|---|
| 1630 | 11 households |
| 1825 | 112 |
| 1852 | 126 |
| 1871 | 123 |
| 1905 | 136 |
| 1946 | 230 |
| 1970 | 199 |
| 2011 | 195 |
| 2021 | 184 |
