= Hühnerküppel =

- Location within Hesse

Highest point
- Elevation: 369.3 m (1,212 ft)
- Coordinates: 50°24′11″N 8°21′20″E

Geography
- Location: Hesse, Germany

Hühnerküppel is a hill of Hesse, Germany.
