= Weil (river) =

River in Germany

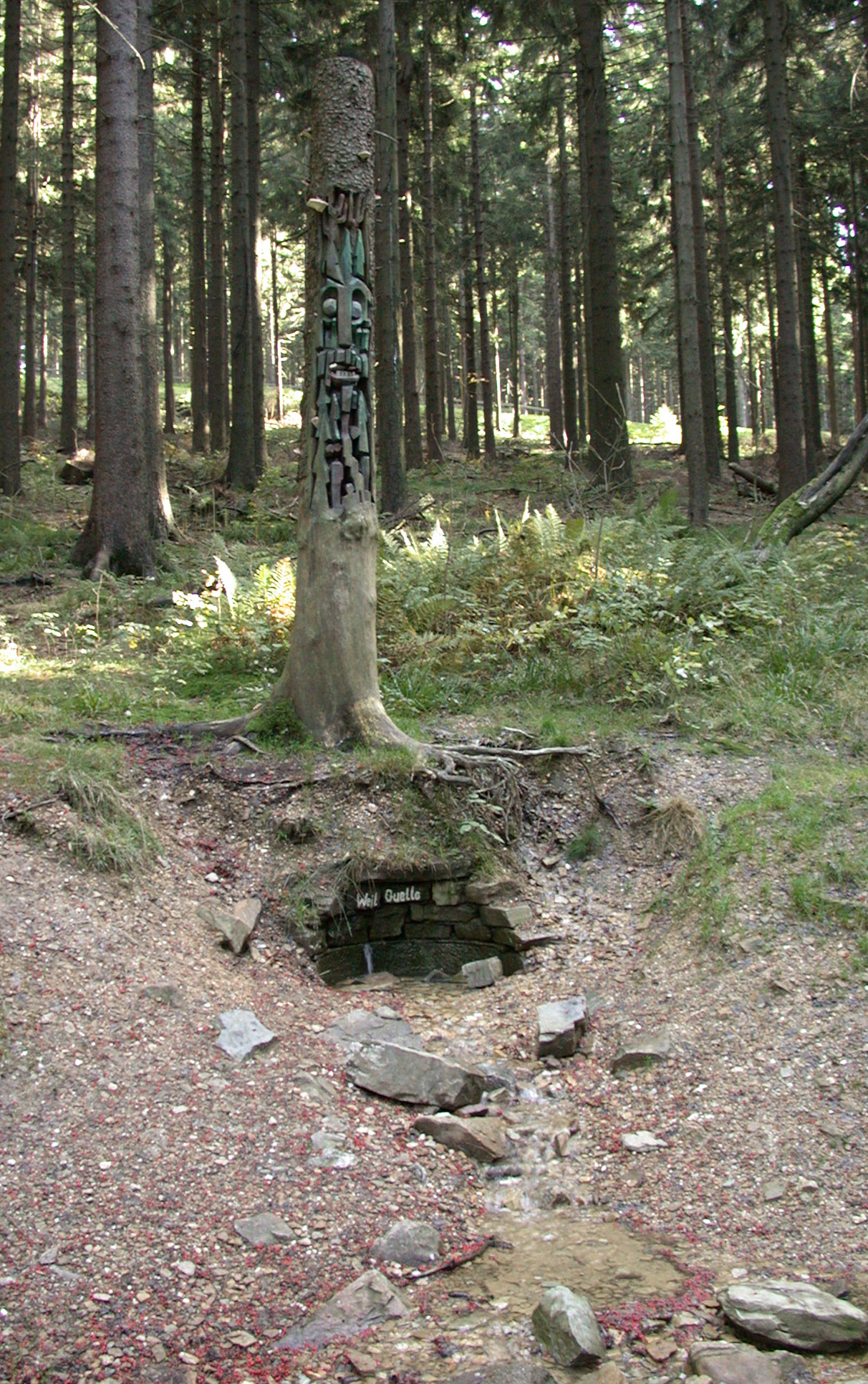
- Source of the Weil

Location
- Country: Germany
- State: Hesse

Physical characteristics
- Source
  - location: Taunus
  - elevation: 740 m (2,430 ft)
- Mouth
  - location: Lahn
  - coordinates: 50°28′26″N 8°15′50″E
- Length: 46.6 km (29.0 mi)
- Basin size: 248 km^{2} (96 sq mi)

Basin features
- Progression: Lahn→ Rhine→ North Sea

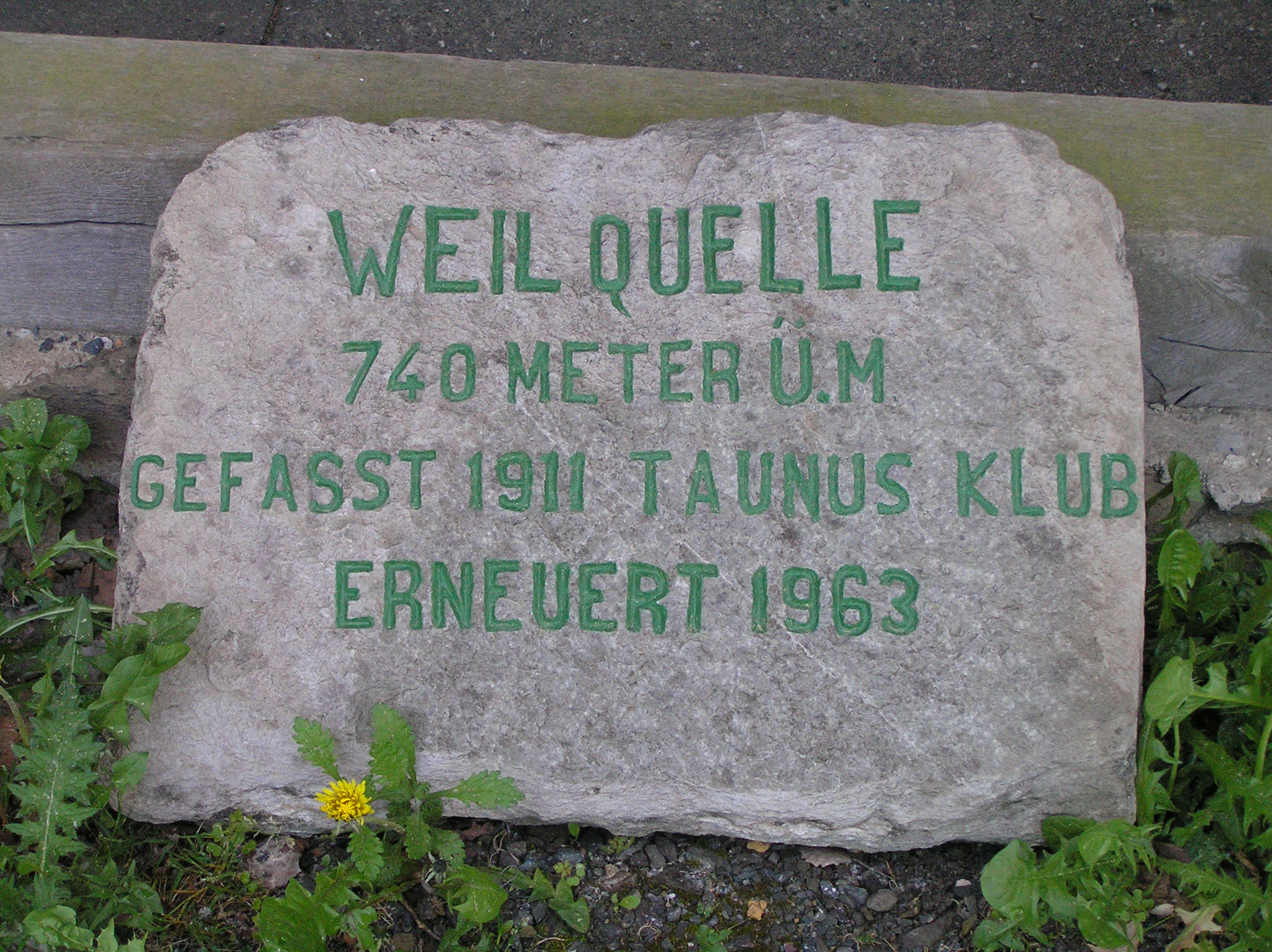
Source of the Weil 1963 by Taunusklub

The Weil (German pronunciation: [vaɪl]) is 46.6-kilometre-long (29.0 mi) river in Hesse, Germany. It is a left tributary to the Lahn river and the town of Weilburg is located next to its mouth. The river flows exclusively through the Taunus mountain range with its source being located between the Kleiner Feldberg and Großer Feldberg mountains. It flows through Schmitten, Weilrod and Weilmünster. A hiking trail as well as a biking trail follow the course of the river.
