= Apostolopoulos =

Apostolopoulos (Greek: Αποστολόπουλος) is a Greek surname. Notable people with the surname include:

- Alexis Apostolopoulos (born 1991), Greek footballer
- Andreas Apostolopoulos (1952–2021), Greek-Canadian businessman
- Apostolos Apostolopoulos (born 2002), Greek footballer
- Iasonas Apostolopoulos, Greek human rights activist and civil engineer
- Konstantinos Apostolopoulos (born 1993), Greek footballer
- Steve Apostolopoulos, Canadian businessman
- Vasilios Apostolopoulos (born 1988), Greek footballer
