= Human rights defender =

Person who acts to protect human rights

A human rights defender or human rights activist is a person who, individually or with others, acts to promote or protect human rights. They can be journalists, environmentalists, whistleblowers, trade unionists, lawyers, teachers, housing campaigners, participants in direct action, or just individuals acting alone. They can defend rights as part of their jobs or in a voluntary capacity. As a result of their activities, human rights defenders (HRDs) are often subjected to reprisals including smears, surveillance, harassment, false charges, arbitrary detention, restrictions on the right to freedom of association, physical attack, and even murder. In 2020, at least 331 HRDs were murdered in 25 countries. The international community and some national governments have attempted to respond to this violence through various protections, but violence against HRDs continues to rise. Women human rights defenders and environmental human rights defenders (who are very often indigenous) face greater repression and risks than human rights defenders working on other issues.

In 1998, the United Nations issued their Declaration on Human Rights Defenders to legitimise the work of human rights defenders and extend protection for human rights activity. Following this Declaration, increasing numbers of activists have adopted the HRD label; this is especially true for professional human rights workers.

== Definition ==
The term human rights defender (HRD) became commonly used within the international human rights community after the UN General Assembly issued the Declaration on the Right and Responsibility of Individuals, Groups and Organs of Society to Promote and Protect Universally Recognised Human Rights and Fundamental Freedoms (A/RES/53/144, 1998), commonly known as the Declaration on Human Rights Defenders. Prior to this Declaration, activist, worker, or monitor were more common terms for people working to defend human rights. The Declaration on Human Rights Defenders created a very broad definition of human rights defenders to include anyone who promotes or defends human rights. This broad definition presents both challenges and benefits to stakeholders and donors seeking to support HRD protection programs, as more precise definitions exclude some categories of HRDs, but such broad definition also leaves much room for interpretation and can make it difficult to establish HRD status for some at-risk individuals.

In 2004, the Office of the United Nations High Commissioner for Human Rights issued Fact Sheet 29 to further define and support human rights defenders. This document states that, "no 'qualification' is required to be a human rights defender," but that the minimum standards for HRDs are acceptance of the universality of human rights and non-violent action.

Some researchers have attempted to demarcate categories of human rights defenders for the purpose of better understanding patterns of HRD risks. Such categorisation may discern professional vs. non-professional activity, or differentiate based on the specific rights that are being defended such as the rights of women, or indigenous land rights.

=== Self identification ===
Self-identification as a human rights defender is more common among professional human rights advocates who work within established institutions, governments, or NGOs. Individuals who work outside of these systems commonly self-identify as 'activists', 'leaders', or by a broad range of other terms instead of human rights defenders, even when their activity falls clearly within the scope outlined by the UN Declaration on Human Rights Defenders. Use of the HRD identity could benefit human rights activists by legitimising their work and facilitating access to protective measures. Use of the HRD identity can also be counterproductive by directing attention to particular individuals rather than focusing on the collective nature of their work, which may also have the effect of further endangering these individuals.

== Threats to human rights defenders ==
Human rights defenders (HRDs) face severe repression and retaliation from government and private actors including the police, military, local elites, private security forces, right-wing groups, and multi-national corporations. Abuses include threats, arbitrary arrest and detainment, harassment, defamation, deregistration, withdrawal of licencing and dismissal from professional careers, services and jobs, expelling, eviction, disappearance, and murder. HRDs who work on women's rights (WHRDs) or whomever challenges cultural gender norms tend to have an increased risks comparatively to other HRDs, this is increased for less prominent workers in remote areas. Environmental human rights defenders (EHRDs) who work on environmental rights, land rights, and indigenous rights issues also face greater threats than other HRDs; in 2020 69% of the HRDs killed globally were working on these issues.

A report published by Front Line Defenders in 2020 found that at least 331 HRDs were murdered that year in 25 countries. Although indigenous people only account for about 6% of the global population, approximately 1/3 of these murdered HRDs were indigenous. In 2019, 304 HRDs were murdered in 31 countries. Global Witness reported that 1,922 EHRDs were killed in 52 countries between 2002 and 2019. 80% of these deaths were in Latin America. Approximately 1/3 of the EHRDs reported killed between 2015 and 2019 were indigenous. Documentation of this violence is incomplete, and for every death there may be as many as a hundred cases of severe repression such as detainment, eviction, defamation, etc.

Research conducted by the Business and Human Rights Resource Center documented a 34 percent increase worldwide in attacks against human rights activists in 2017. The figures included 120 suspected murders and hundreds of incidents that involved assault, bullying, and threats. There were 388 attacks in 2017 compared to only 290 in 2016. The same study identified human rights defenders connected to agribusiness, mining, and renewable energy sectors (EHRDs) as those in greatest danger. Lawyers and members of environmental groups were also at risk.

== UN Declaration on Human Rights Defenders ==
The United Nations Declaration on the Right and Responsibility of Individuals, Groups and Organs of Society to Promote and Protect Universally Recognized Human Rights and Fundamental Freedoms (A/RES/53/144) on December 9, 1998, commonly known as the Declaration on Human Rights Defenders, is the first UN instrument to legitimise and define human rights defenders, as well as the right and responsibility for everyone to protect human rights.

The Declaration is not legally binding, but it articulates rights established by existing human rights treaties and applies them to human rights defenders in order to legitimise their work and extend protection of HRDs. Under the Declaration, a human rights defender is anyone who works to promote or protect human rights: whether professionally or non-professionally; alone or as part of group or institution.

The Declaration articulates existing rights in a way that makes it easier to apply them to human rights defenders. The rights protected under the Declaration include, among others, the right to develop and discuss new human rights ideas and to advocate their acceptance; the right to criticise government bodies and agencies and to make proposals to improve their functioning; the right to provide legal assistance or other advice and assistance in defence of human rights; the right to observe fair trials; the right to unhindered access to and communication with non-governmental and intergovernmental organisations; the right to access resources for the purpose of protecting human rights, including the receipt of funds from abroad; and the rights of free expression, association and assembly.

The Declaration indicates that states have a responsibility to implement and respect the provisions of the Declaration and emphasises the duty of the state to protect HRDs from violence, retaliation and intimidation as a consequence of their human rights work. The Declaration also places responsibility to protect human rights at the individual level and especially upon individuals in public service and professions that may affect human rights such as, medical, the judicial system that is including law enforcement etc.

== Women human rights defenders ==
Women human rights defenders (WHRDs) are women who defend human rights, and defenders of all genders who defend the rights of women and rights related to gender and sexuality. Their work and the challenges they face have been recognized by a United Nations (UN) resolution in 2013, which calls for specific protection for women human rights defenders.

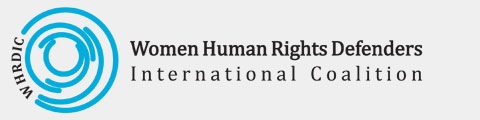
This is the logo for the Women Human Rights Defenders International Coalition that represents the coming together and discussing problematic issues dealing with human rights for all.

A woman human rights defender can be an Indigenous woman fighting for the rights of her community, a woman advocating against torture, an LGBTQI rights campaigner, a sex workers' rights collective, or a man fighting for sexual and reproductive rights.

Like other human rights defenders, women human rights defenders can be the target of attacks as they demand the realization of human rights. They face attacks such as discrimination, assault, threats, and violence within their communities. Women human rights defenders face additional obstacles based on who they are and the specific rights they defend. This means they are targeted just because they are women, LGBTI people or for identifying with their struggles. They also face additional obstacles connected with Institutional discrimination and inequality and because they challenge, or are seen to be challenging, patriarchal power and social norms. They are more at risk of facing gender based violence in the home and the community, and sexist, misogynistic, homophobic, trans-phobic threats, smears and stigmatization, as well as exclusion from resources and power.

International Women Human Rights Defenders Day has been celebrated each 29 November since 2006.

In 2017, female activists who were killed because of their advocacies and activities in defending human rights were honored during the International Women Human Rights Defenders' Day. Those murdered criticized corruption and other forms of injustice, protect their lands from governments and multinational corporations, and upheld the rights of lesbians, gays and transgender individuals.

== Environmental human rights defenders ==
Environmental human rights defenders or simply environmental defenders, have been defined by the UN Environment Programme as, "defenders carrying out a vast range of activities related to land and environmental rights, including those working on issues related to extractive industries, and construction and development projects." They also state that environmental defenders are, "defending environmental rights, including constitutional rights to a clean and healthy environment, when the exercise of those rights is being threatened whether or not they self-identify as human rights defenders. Many environmental defenders engage in their activities through sheer necessity."

The use of the term Environmental defender (or Environmental human rights defender) by human rights organizations, the media, and academia is recent and associated with the UN Declaration on Human Rights Defenders. However, the approach and role of environmental defenders is closely related to earlier concepts developed as early as the 1980s such as environmental justice and environmentalism of the poor. Although these different terms have different origins, they converge around the re-establishment of land-based cultures, re-making of place for marginalized people, and protection of land and livelihood from activities such as resource extraction, dumping of toxic waste, and land appropriation. Since the 1998 UN Declaration, the term environmental defenders is increasingly used by global organizations and media to refer to this convergence of goals and analysis.

== Protection instruments ==
Following the adoption of the Declaration on Human Rights Defenders in 1998, a number of initiatives were taken, both at the international and regional level, to increase the protection of defenders and contribute to the implementation of the Declaration. In this context, the following mechanisms and guidelines were established:

- The mandate of the United Nations Special Rapporteur on human rights defenders (2000)
- The mandate of the Special Rapporteur of the African Commission on Human and Peoples' Rights on human rights defenders (2004)
- The Human Rights Defenders Unit of the Inter-American Commission on Human Rights (2001)
- The European Union Guidelines on human rights defenders (2004)
- The Declaration of the Committee of Ministers on Council of Europe action to improve the protection of human rights defenders and promote their activities (2008)
- The European Union Human Rights Defenders mechanism, which is implemented by civil society organizations, ProtectDefenders.eu (2015)

In 2008, the Observatory for the Protection of Human Rights Defenders, a joint programme of the International Federation for Human Rights (FIDH) and the World Organisation Against Torture (OMCT), took the initiative to gather all the human rights defenders' institutional mandate-holders (created within the United Nations, the African Commission on Human and Peoples' Rights, the Inter-American Commission on Human Rights, Council of Europe, the Organisation for Security and Cooperation in Europe, the European Union) to find ways to enhance coordination and complementarities among themselves and with NGOs. In 2010, a single inter-mechanisms website was created, gathering all relevant public information on the activities of the different human rights defenders' protection mandate-holders. It aims to increase the visibility of the documentation produced by the mechanisms (press releases, studies, reports, statements), as well as of their actions (country visits, institutional events, trials observed).

In 2016, the International Service for Human Rights published the 'Model National Law on the Recognition and Protection of Human Rights Defenders'. This document provides authoritative guidance to states on how to implement the UN Declaration on Human Rights Defenders at the national level. It was developed in collaboration with hundreds of defenders and endorsed by leading human rights experts and jurists.

Several countries have introduced national legislation or policies to protect human rights defenders including Colombia, Brazil, Mexico, and Guatemala; however, key challenges in implementation remain.

== Awards for human rights defenders ==
- The United Nations Prize in the Field of Human Rights in 1998.
- The Martin Ennals Award, a collaboration of several human rights NGOs. Martin Ennals was a renowned human rights defender and secretary general of Amnesty International. Its secretariat is located at the OMCT office in Geneva. The award carries a grant of at least 20,000 Swiss Francs (about 20,000 US dollars) to be used for further work in the field of human rights.
- The Robert F. Kennedy Human Rights Award, established in 1984.
- The Sakharov Prize, established in 1988 by the European Parliament. Laureates include: Nelson Mandela, Malala Yousafzai, the Mothers of the Plaza de Mayo, Raif Badawi.
- The Human Rights Defenders Tulip, established by the Netherlands government in 2008.
- Several human rights defenders have received the Nobel Peace Prize, such as imprisoned Chinese human rights activist Liu Xiaobo who won the 2010 Nobel Peace Prize for his "long and non-violent struggle for fundamental human rights in China".
- The Front Line Defenders Award for Human Rights Defenders at Risk, established in 2005 to 'honour the work of a human rights defender who, through non-violent work, is courageously making an outstanding contribution to the promotion and protection of the human rights of others.'
- The Ginetta Sagan award for Women Human Rights Defenders, established in 1997 "to help women throughout the world in their struggle to overcome oppression, to let them know that they are not alone". Awardees include Hina Jilani, Sonia Pierre, Lydia Cacho, Julienne Lusenge.
- The Nuremberg International Human Rights Award, established by the city of Nuremberg; the inaugural award was made in 1995.
- The Cao Shunli Memorial Award for Human Rights Defenders, first awarded in 2015, named after Chinese lawyer and activist Cao Shunli. The award is given by Chinese Human Rights Defenders.

== Electronic mapping ==
Electronic mapping is a newly developed tool using electronic networks and satellite imagery and tracking. Examples include tactical mapping, crisis mapping and geo-mapping. Tactical mapping has been primarily used in tracking human rights abuses by providing visualization of the tracking and implementation monitoring.

== Examples of HRDs ==
Examples of notable Human Rights Defenders (arranged alphabetically):

- Iasonas Apostolopoulos
- Kehkashan Basu
- Noam Chomsky
- Auguste Corteau
- Waris Dirie
- Aicha Duihi
- Mahatma Gandhi
- Jia Hu
- Jaswant Singh Khalra
- Martin Luther King Jr.
- Abraham Lincoln
- Narges Mohammadi
- Nadia Murad
- Alexei Navalny
- Jesús Permuy
- Desmond Tutu
- Elie Wiesel
- Joseph Wresinski
- Malala Yousafzai

Other notable examples:

In 2017, Human rights lawyer Emil Kurbedinov, a Crimean Tatar, won the 2017 Award for Frontline Human Rights Defenders at Risk. Kurbedinov has been an avid defender of civil society militants, mistreated Crimean Tatars, and members of the media. He documents violations of human rights during searches of activists' residences as well as emergency responses. In January 2017, the Crimean Center for Counteracting Extremism arrested and detained the lawyer. He was taken to a local facility of the Russian Federal Security Service for questioning. A district tribunal ruled that Kurbedinov was guilty of doing propaganda work for terrorist groups and organizations. He was sentenced to 10 days of imprisonment.

== See also ==
- Land defender
- List of human rights organisations
- Global justice
- Global Human Rights Defence
- Human Rights Logo
- International human rights instruments
- National human rights institutions
- Networked advocacy
- Protection International
- Youth for Human Rights International
