= Beugel =

Beugel or van der Beugel is a surname. Notable people with the surname include:

- Ernst van der Beugel (1918–2004), Dutch economist, businessman, and politician
- Jacob van der Beugel (born 1978), UK-born Dutch artist
- Ingeborg Beugel (born 1960), Dutch freelance correspondent
