= 2023 Pylos migrant boat disaster =

Sinking in the Ionian Sea off the Greek coast

- Aerial photo of the migrant boat taken by HCG
- Date: 14 June 2023
- Time: 2:04 a.m. (EEST)
- Location: 80 km (45 nmi) off the coast of Pylos, Greece; 36.915°N 21.246°E
- Casualties: 104 rescued and transferred to Kalamata
- Deaths: 82 (confirmed)
- Missing: Up to 500 presumed dead, including 209 from Pakistan

On 14 June 2023, Adriana, (Note: The name of the fishing boat has been variously reported as Adriana, Andriana and Andrianna, though it is commonly left unnamed.) an Italy-bound fishing trawler smuggling migrants, sank in international waters in the part of the Mediterranean known as the Ionian Sea, off the coast of Pylos, Messenia, Greece. The boat had a capacity of 400 people, but was carrying an estimated 400 to 750 migrants, mostly from Pakistan, Syria, Palestine, and Egypt, and some from Afghanistan. After departing from Tobruk, Libya, on 10 June, concerns were raised by 13 June, with the vessel then located in the Maritime Search and Rescue (SAR) zone assigned to Greece. The Hellenic Coast Guard (HCG) helicopter and later the HCG vessel ΠΠΛΣ-920 arrived on scene, took aerial photos of the vessel, made offers of assistance that were allegedly refused, then by some accounts remained there as an observer until the boat capsized and sank, despite calm weather conditions. After Adriana had sunk "close to the deepest part of the Mediterranean Sea", the HCG and the military initiated a massive search and rescue operation. One hundred and four men were rescued, and 82 bodies were recovered. By 18 June, officials had acknowledged that over 500 people were "presumed dead."

By July 2023, investigations by the BBC, the New York Times, The Guardian, German public broadcaster ARD/NDR/Funk and Greek investigative outlet Solomon, together with research agency Forensis research group—a sister organisation of Forensic Architecture— cast doubts on the original reports by the HCG. Based on survivors' interviews, court documents, and sources from the coastguards they found evidence suggesting that the HCG ship may have caused the overcrowded vessel to capsize while attempting to tow it, which HCG denies. The HCG said it was caused by a "commotion" on the vessel. When Adriana capsized and sank shortly after 2:00 AM (EEST), the only vessel present was the HCG vessel ΠΠΛΣ-920 manned by a team that included four armed special operations coast guards wearing masks.

The European Ombudsman is investigating accusations that European Union (EU) border protection agency, Frontex, and the HCG did not take preventative steps to avoid the shipwreck. By a year after the disaster, both Amnesty International and Human Rights Watch had criticized the slow progress of official investigations.

== Background ==
Although the European migrant crisis had reached a peak in 2015, the European Union Agency for Law Enforcement Cooperation (Europol) reported in 2018 that there were at least 65,000 migrant smugglers being tracked in the booming illegal trade, which had become one of the "fastest growing forms of international organised crime." The people-smuggling business developed as a result of Libya's ongoing crisis, alongside instability in neighboring countries, with Libya becoming a hub for moving migrants and refugees across the Mediterranean into Europe. According to a February 2023 International Organization for Migration (IOM) report, there were over 706,062 migrants representing 44 nationalities in a hundred Libyan municipalities and the numbers continue to rise.

The 2022–2023 Pakistani economic crisis hampered Pakistan's ability to import essential food products, and forced Pakistani people to seek opportunities abroad.

The IOM declared the Northern Africa to Italy sea route for migrants and refugees seeking to get to Europe as the deadliest on earth, which has recorded 21,000 deaths since 2014. Human smugglers crowd migrants into unseaworthy vessels, often in locked holds for days-long journeys.

According to the BBC, in 2023 most migrants and refugees land in Italy because it is closer to Western Europe than Greece.

Such maritime smuggling routes into Europe have seen an increasing number of fatal incidents: 3,800 people died in 2022 while traversing migrant and refugee routes from the Middle East and North Africa, of whom 3,789 died on sea-based routes in and around the region. On 26 February 2023, at least 94 people died when a wooden boat from İzmir, Turkey, sank off Cutro in Southern Italy in the deadliest Mediterranean maritime incident of 2023 up to that point.

Since 2015, when the stream of Middle Eastern, Asian, and African migrants and refugees attempting to enter European Union nations reached its height, Greece became the "main thoroughfare". Greek authorities have argued that the number of newly arrived migrants places a "disproportionate burden" on them. Shortly after the Pylos shipwreck, a spokesperson from the Greek migration ministry told the BBC that he wanted a European Union migration policy that accepted migrants who were in need, not just those who can afford to pay smugglers.

With the election of the center-right New Democracy party leader, Kyriakos Mitsotakis as prime minister in 2019 the country took a "harder line" against the tens of thousands of asylum seekers in Greece—often Syrian war refugees.

Since 2015, with hundreds of thousands of asylum seekers attempting to enter the European Union member states, the word "pushback" entered the EU lexicon. In the 2021 report of the UN Special Rapporteur on the human rights of migrants, Felipe González Morales defined pushbacks as "measures, actions or policies effectively resulting in the removal of migrants, individually or in groups, without an individualized assessment in line with human rights obligations and due process guarantees. According to a 19 July 2023 article by the German public broadcaster, Deutsche Welle (DW), pushbacks had "become so so systematic, they are de facto policy." In 2021, Amnesty International has said that Greece has used pushbacks as their "de facto border policy" to discourage asylum seekers.

A July 2023 BBC article about the deadly Pylos shipwreck said that there was an increase in international attention to pushbacks in Greece following the New York Times 19 May release of video footage taken on Lesbos, Greece, where 12 asylum seekers, including an infant, were forced into a van, taken by speedboat to a HCG vessel, transferred to an inflatable raft in the Aegean Sea, then abandoned at sea under the hot sun.

A BBC article from June 2024 alleges that the Greek coastguard has, on occasion, purposefully forced people out of territorial waters, even after individuals have reached the Greek islands. Over the course of 2020 to 2023, 15 incidences resulting in 43 deaths occurred. Migrants alleged that the coastguard physically threw them overboard.

== Timeline ==
=== The migrant boat, Adriana ===
Eastern Mediterranean, showing Adriana's route and Kalamata, Messenia, where survivors were taken

The Italy-bound "rusted, aging", overloaded migrant boat was a fishing trawler, named Adriana, that was estimated to be around 20 to 30 metres (66 to 98 ft) long. The Greek newspaper, Kathimerini, had reported on 9 June that smugglers had to convince apprehensive migrants to get on board a boat they thought was incapable of making "the more-than-five-hundred-nautical-mile journey" with hundreds of passengers. It had departed from Tobruk, a city in Cyrenaica, Libya, south of the Greek island of Crete, on 10 June 2023. According to one estimate the boat had the capacity to carry at most 400 people, but could have been carrying up to 750 people including men, women, and children. According to a PBS Newshour report, traffickers charged each passenger US$4,500, which meant that the traffickers could have potentially made more than US$3 million. Aerial photos showing the boat's overladen upper and lower decks were taken by the HCG hours before the boat capsized.

Initially, the IOM estimated that around 400 were aboard. Ioannis Zafiropoulos, the deputy mayor of the Greek port city of Kalamata, stated that there were over 500.

No one on board had a life jacket. The Washington Post reported after the tragedy that rescue ship best practice includes the distribution of life jackets via smaller boats.

=== Distress calls and response ===
At 9:55 a.m. (EEST) on Tuesday, 13 June, Nawal Soufi, an activist posted on Twitter (now X), that the fishing vessel Adriana was in distress. She wrote, "At this moment I was told by the group of migrants on board the boat in distress with 750 people that 6 people are dead and two others are in critical condition. I hope from the bottom of my heart to be proven wrong by someone." Her second tweet included the coordinates of the fishing boat. According to the Refugee Support Aegean (RSA), this was the first public announcement of the fishing boat's distress.

Alarm Phone, a European rescue-support charity had also received a distress call—the person calling said that there were about 750 people on board. Alarm Phone reported that the passengers were saying that the captain had abandoned the ship.

At 11:00 a.m. (EEST) on 13 June, the Italian coast guard alerted Greek authorities and the European Union (EU) border protection agency, Frontex, of the vessel in distress and also told the HCG that there were two dead children on board, according to the RSA. The Italian authorities informed the HCG of the peculiar movements of the vessel. The HCG said that Frontex aircraft and two merchant ships detected the vessel approaching north at high speeds, prompting the dispatch of more aircraft and vessels. Offers for aid were made to the ship but were refused according to the HCG.

The Coast Guard claimed in official statements that the boat and its passengers had refused assistance because its destination was Italy, and so its boats had hung back.

In the afternoon, one of the merchant ships approached Adriana and offered it assistance; the passengers refused it. Another merchant ship later did the same and received the same response. A HCG patrol approached the deck of the vessel in the evening, where they confirmed the presence of a large number of migrants. The migrants again refused any aid, stating that they wished to continue to Italy. In all three instances, the migrants stated that they wanted food and water, which the Greek patrol ship and a Maltese-flagged merchant ship provided. The Greek patrol later accompanied the vessel.

According to audio leaked in February 2025, an officer from the Greek rescue coordination centre instructed Adriana to tell the captain of an approaching ship, Lucky Sailor, that the migrants' destination was Italy, not Greece. When the captain of Lucky Sailor later communicated with the same rescue coordination centre he informed a coordination officer that the migrants had screamed that they wanted to go to Italy, not Greece, after which the coordination officer twice asked the captain to write that information in the ship's log. The Greek coastguard did not comment on the leaked conversations.

=== Capsizing ===
At around 1:40 a.m. (EEST) on 14 June, the HCG learned that Adriana's engine had broken down. After receiving a plea for aid, HCG officers then approached the ship. They stated that they then "saw the boat take a right turn, then a sharp left, and then another right so big that it caused the vessel to capsize." (Later the HCG said that they had used one rope during their assessment of the situation, some two hours before the ship capsized.) Around 10 to 15 minutes later, Adriana sank, sending its passengers into the waves of the Ionian Sea. Survivors of the shipwreck have stated that a HCG vessel caused the fishing boat to capsize by attempting to tow it at dangerously high speeds, despite passengers' cries of distress to stop. Survivors have also stated that during their ensuing interrogations they were advised by interrogators not to discuss the boat having been towed, and that reports from individual interrogations reading word-for-word identically would suggest that their testimonies were altered. The ship sank around 50 miles (80 km) off the coast of Pylos, Messenia, in the Peloponnese, in an area around 13,000 to 17,000 feet (4,000 to 5,200 m) deep, which has been described as being near the "deepest part of the Mediterranean Sea".

=== Search, rescue, and detention ===
Immediately following the sinking, the HCG and the military initiated a massive search and rescue operation. This account has been disputed by survivors who stated that, "The Greek boat tied a rope in the middle of the boat. It went right, left and then right again, very quickly. Then the boat capsized, and everyone fell into the water," and "Then, they [the Greek coast guard] sailed away and watched us from afar. We spent about two hours in the water." The HCG later stated that the onboard camera recording system was not working, and that telephone data from critical moments in the operation was not recorded.

The operation was complicated by strong winds in the area. Survivors were transferred to Kalamata. After rescuing 104 survivors, the Greek authorities stated that they expected to find no more, leaving hundreds still missing. The Mayan Queen IV, a luxury superyacht, was notified by the HCG to transport 100 of the 104 rescued survivors, as well as recovered bodies, to Kalamata.

The survivors were bussed from Kalamata port to the Reception and Identification Center (RIC) in Malakasa.

== Victims ==
By 18 June, officials acknowledged that over 500 people were presumed dead.

Of the 104 survivors, there were no women and children. The smugglers kept the women and children locked in the hold. Based on survivor accounts, it is believed that up to 100 children were being held at the time of the sinking.

According to leaked testimonies told by survivors, Pakistanis were allegedly forced below deck, with other nationalities allowed on the top deck, where they had a far greater chance of surviving a capsize. Pakistan's Interior Minister, Rana Sanaullah, said that there were at least 350 Pakistani victims on the overloaded vessel. Of the thirty people from the small city of Kotli, only two survived. Pakistan's Federal Investigation Agency has stated that only 12 of the survivors were Pakistani, and that 209 are amongst those still missing (181 from Pakistan and 28 from Pakistan-administered Kashmir). Earlier reports claimed that there were 298 Pakistanis missing, of whom 135 were from Kashmir.

The search for the missing lasted until 15 June with only 82 bodies, including the captain, recovered. The Guardian described it as one of the deadliest shipwrecks of 2023 in the Mediterranean sea.

== Judicial proceedings ==
=== Against trafficking suspects ===
By the evening of 16 June the Greek authorities had arrested nine suspects, all men of Egyptian descent, believed to have been responsible for the people-smuggling operation. On 19 June, the men, aged between 20 and 40, accused of human smuggling and operating the boat, appeared in a Greek court in Kalamata and pleaded not guilty. About 20 mobile phones that had been confiscated by the Greek Coast Guard were surrendered to the court in late July. The crew of the Coast Guard ship provided testimony to the Piraeus Naval Court. On 30 September, 119 days after the shipwreck, the phones of the 13 Coast Guardsmen that were present during the shipwreck were confiscated by order of the Piraeus Naval Court prosecutor as part of the ongoing investigation. Additionally, Pakistani authorities arrested 10 suspected traffickers.

=== Against the HCG ===
A lawsuit on behalf of 40 survivors was filed at the Naval Court of Piraeus in September 2023 alleging that Greek authorities failed to protect the lives of those on board.

On 26 May 2025, 17 coastguards including the captain of the HCG vessel ΠΠΛΣ-920 were charged with various offences related to the sinking and deaths.

== Investigations ==
On 16 June 2023 the IOM and UNHCR, the UN Refugee Agency, welcomed the investigation that was ordered in Greece and called for preventive action. On 3 August, Amnesty International and Human Rights Watch stressed the "need for an effective, independent, and impartial investigation". In a 28 July 2023 letter addressed to Mitsotakis, the Council of Europe Commissioner for Human Rights said that Greece has a "legal obligation to conduct effective investigations into the Pylos shipwreck", which includes fact-finding and the punishment of the persons responsible for hundreds of deaths. This also includes ensuring that the "remains of deceased migrants are located, respected, identified, and buried." Emily O'Reilly, who is the elected European Parliament's European Ombudsman told Euronews that she has demanded access to Frontex's formal report of the capsizing and sinking of Adriana. Both Frontex and the HCG have been accused of not taking preventative steps to avoid the tragedy. On 14 December 2023, six months after the sinking, Amnesty International and Human Rights Watch issued a joint statement saying that the "nature of ongoing judicial investigations in Greece raises concerns about the prospects for accountability for the shipwreck".

According to investigations completed by the BBC and News 24/7, contradicting the Greek coastguard's account of the incident, the boat had not moved for at least seven hours before sinking. A New York Times investigation found that the authorities watched and listened for 13 hours as the boat lost power and drifted aimlessly. An investigation by the Washington Post retraced Adriana's route on the Mediterranean Sea and reported that decisions taken by the HCG had contributed to the tragedy.

A joint investigative team of researchers and journalists, including Solomon, the Forensis research group—a sister organisation of Forensic Architecture—The Guardian, Der Spiegel, and the German national broadcaster, ARD examined court documents, sources from the coastguards, as well as survivors' interviews and found evidence contradicting the HCG's original reports. Other sources for their investigative reporting included "distress signals, videos and photographs by the HCG, Frontex, and nearby commercial vessels as well as logs and testimonies." They said that the Greek coastguard is responsible for the sinking. The joint investigation by Solomon, Forensis, the StrgF/ARD, and The Guardian won the European Parliaments 2023 Daphne Caruana Galizia Prize for investigating the Adriana shipwreck.

An investigation by the BBC alleged that the coastguard pressured the survivors of the wreck to frame the Egyptians as the smugglers. This was corroborated by a joint investigation by Lighthouse Reports and other news organisations based on testimonies from 17 survivors and sources from Frontex. A joint investigation by Lighthouse Reports, Der Spiegel, SIRAJ, El País and Reporters United has revealed that a Libyan network with ties to Khalifa Haftar, was responsible for the smuggling.

== Reactions ==
=== Protests in Greece ===
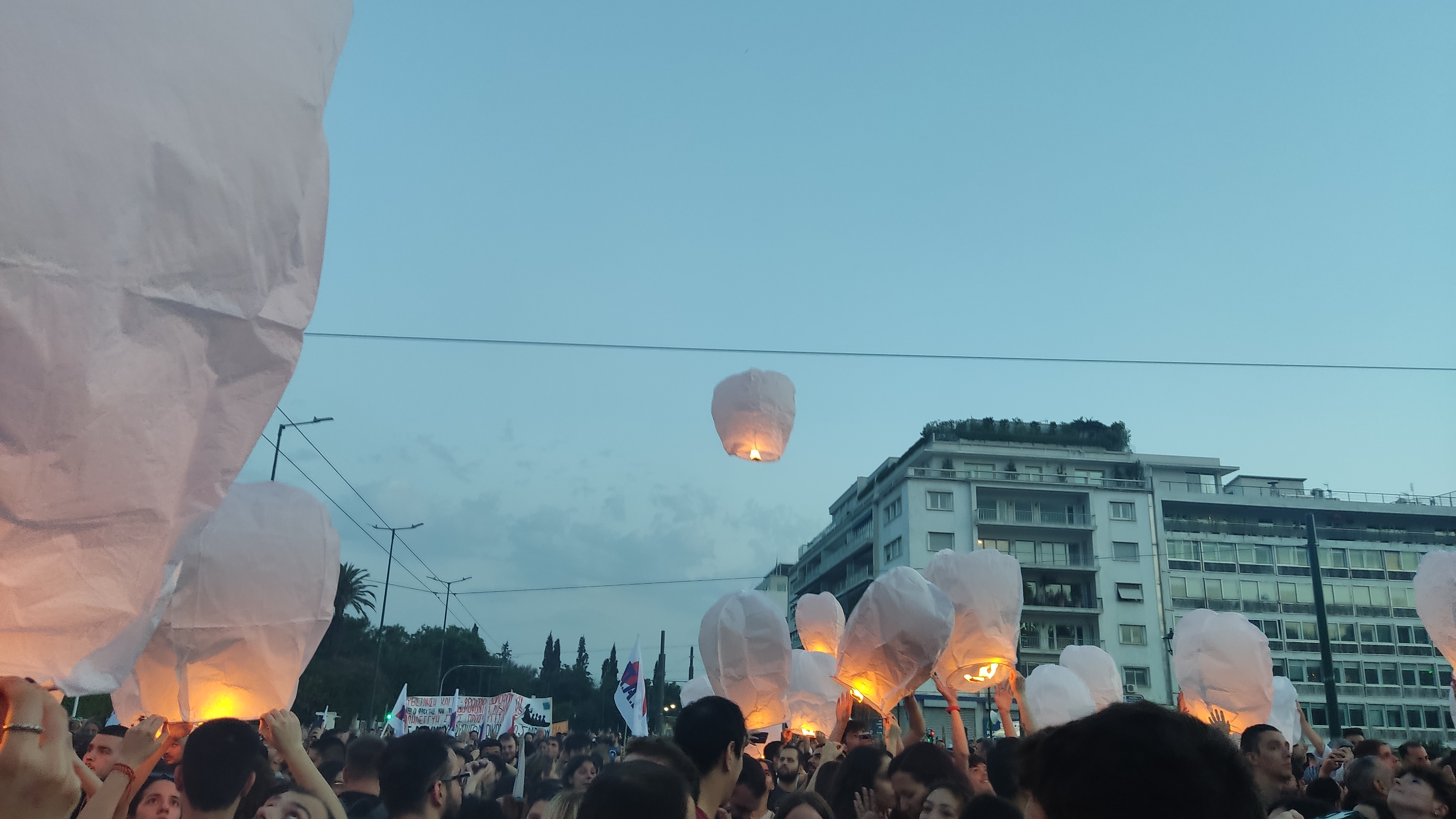
Lanterns lit in memory of the victims during the protest in Athens

On 15 July, thousands protested the European Union's migration policies with protesters converging in Athens and Thessaloniki. Some protestors in Athens threw petrol bombs at police and were teargassed. Protesters in Kalamata demonstrated near the migrant facilities, with one banner reading: "Crocodile tears! No to the EU's pact on migration".

Many left-wing organisations, trade unions, anti-racist collectives and parties, including the Communist Party of Greece, called for protests on 15 June in solidarity with the refugees and against pushbacks and border fences intended to control migration.

On 18 July, the Greek Archaeological Society hosted an event in which, among other issues, the sinking was discussed, with the Greek government responding by evicting the society from its headquarters.

=== Reaction of Greek government and opposition ===
Ioannis Sarmas who served in the role of caretaker prime minister for several weeks in 2023 following his appointment 25 May 2023 by President Katerina Sakellaropoulou, announced three days of national mourning. Sakellaropoulou visited some of the survivors and conveyed her condolences. A special meeting of ministers to discuss assistance for survivors was held on 15 June, where then Sarmas ensured the respect of rights to communicate via phone or email with family members was granted to survivors who are being held at the Reception and Identification Center (RIC) in Malakasa, since Friday.

The opposition leader, Alexis Tsipras, said he had visited Kalamata port and spoken with survivors who said they had "called for help". He asked: "What sort of protocol does not call for the rescue... of an overloaded boat about to sink?" Tsipras said European migration policy "turns the Mediterranean, our seas, into watery graves".

=== Reactions in Pakistan ===
Because of the large death toll of Pakistanis, the Pakistani prime minister Shehbaz Sharif declared a day of mourning on 19 June 2023. The Pakistani newspaper Dawn editorialised that "racist laws, anti-migration policies" which aimed to prevent migrants from entering safely and legally were to blame for the deaths of thousands of refugees.

=== Cyprus ===
On 15 June 2023 it was reported that in Cyprus, MPs of ELAM walked out on a parliamentary moment of silence for the victims of the shipwreck. In response to criticism of the far-right party's actions, it put out a statement that the moment of silence was "political exploitation" and "the aim is so that society will feel guilty for a crime committed by traffickers."

=== Comparisons with response to the Titan submersible implosion ===
Former US president Barack Obama contrasted the way in which the public turned a "blind eye" to the 14 June Adriana migrant boat tragedy—which received little media attention—with the "obsessive", "minute-by-minute", "twenty-four hour" coverage of the 18 June OceanGate Titan submersible implosion, in which five tourists in the submersible died in their failed attempt to visit the wreckage of the Titanic. Survivors of the Adriana wreck requested that the ship be raised and the bodies recovered but were told this would be too difficult and the waters too deep. The survivors contrasted the unwillingness of the authorities with the vast amount of money and resources spent in locating and ultimately recovering the remains of the Titan submersible.

=== Descriptions of shipwreck as preventable ===
The New York Times, Washington Post, The Guardian, The Conversation, Human Rights Watch, Amnesty International, UNCHR Greece and Refugee Support Aegean (RSA) described the deadly Pylos shipwreck as preventable.

=== International reactions ===
- Ursula von der Leyen, President of the European Commission, promised that European Union member nations would work together to "crack down on migrant smuggling practices".
- António Guterres, UN Secretary General, stated on 14 June 2023, that “this is yet another example of the need for Member States to come together and create orderly safe pathways for people forced to flee and for comprehensive action to save lives at sea and reduce perilous journeys.”
- UN Committee on Migrant Workers (CMW), released a statement on 21 June 2023, calling on the European Union, the African Union and the League of Arab States to work together to establish safe and regular migration routes after at least 81 migrants drowned and hundreds more went missing in one of Europe's deadliest shipwrecks.
- Dunja Mijatović, Council of Europe Commissioner for Human Rights, sent a letter on 19 July 2023 to the Prime Minister of Greece, Kyriakos Mitsotakis stressing that Greece has a legal obligation to conduct effective investigations into the Pylos shipwreck, which resulted in the death of more than 80 persons with many hundreds still missing, to establish the facts and, where appropriate, to lead to the punishment of those responsible. The Commissioner expresses concern about reports of pressure having been exercised on survivors and about allegations of irregularities in the collection of evidence and testimonies, which may have led to a minimisation of the focus on certain actors in this tragedy, including the Greek Coast Guard.

== See also ==
- 2013 Lampedusa migrant shipwreck
- 2014 Malta migrant shipwreck
- 2023 Calabria migrant boat disaster
- 2026 Chios migrant boat shipwreck
- List of maritime disasters in the 21st century
- List of migrant vessel incidents on the Mediterranean Sea
- List of shipwrecks in 2023
