= Channel Rescue =

British human rights organisation

Channel Rescue is a British human rights organisation, focused on monitoring the British government's response to the English Channel migrant crossings.

== History ==
The organisation was founded in 2020 by a group of anti-racist and anti-fascist activists, basing themselves off monitoring work done by human rights groups in Greece around the Lesbos refugee camps. The group raised £19 000 through a GoFundMe crowd fundraiser.

== Activities ==
The group monitors the activity of the Border Force in response to the migrant boats in the English Channel, including logging the coordinates of responses, the ships involved, and the interactions between the Border Force and asylum seekers. The group also files freedom of information requests to increase the amount of public information concerning the Border Force's activities. The group additionally provides training on ensuring that migrant boats can dock safely.

The group has opposed attempts by the Home Office to introduce pushback tactics in the English Channel. In September 2021, the group published evidence showing that the Border Force was trialling the use of jet skis to collide with migrant boats and shift the direction of their movement. In November 2021, the group launched a legal action against the government proposals for those practices, saying that the proposals were illegal under maritime law and were inhumane.

The group has also opposed proposals by the Home Office to make claiming asylum in the UK more difficult.
