= 2026 Chios migrant boat shipwreck =

Capsizing of migrant vessel off the coast of Chios

- Date: 3 February 2026
- Location: Near Mirsinidi, Chios, Greece
- Casualties: 25 rescued
- Deaths: 15 (confirmed)
- Missing: Unknown

On 3 February 2026, a collision occurred between an inflatable speedboat carrying migrants and a patrol boat of the Greek coast guard a few kilometers off the island of Chios. The shipwreck resulted in the death of at least 15 people, with 25 migrants being rescued, including 11 minors, and one injured woman later succumbing to her wounds. Two pregnant women had miscarriages. The vast majority of the confirmed 15 fatalities were caused by severe head trauma, not drowning, while the number of missing passengers remains unknown. Two members of the Greek coast guard were slightly injured. All survivors from the speedboat were Afghan nationals, except a Moroccan man who was arrested on charges of smuggling.

There have been conflicting accounts of the collision with the Greek coast guard stating that the speedboat had its lights switched off and ignored signals to stop, with a pursuit ensuing and leading to the speedboat ramming the patrol boat on the side. Passengers disputed this account, saying the patrol boat ran over the inflatable.

With a history of pushbacks, the Greek authorities were criticized for the handling of the operation, with questions arising about the claimed speed of the inflatable, the patrol boat camera being off at the time of the incident and the likelihood of 15 deaths by severe head injury being consistent with the damage shown on the patrol boat in later photographs. Government officials stood behind the coast guard, dismissing allegations of pushbacks, assigning the blame to smugglers and stating "we will continue to defend our borders".

== Accounts of the collision ==
=== Coastguard's account ===
According to the Greek Coastguard, on the night of 3 February 2026, a coastguard patrol boat located the inflatable boat navigating with the lights off towards the eastern coast of Chios, off Mirsinidi beach. The patrol boat warned the driver of the inflatable with sirens and light signals, but the driver did not comply with the warnings and change course instead, crashing into the right side of the patrol boat. The intensity of the crash resulted in the capsizing and sinking of the inflatable with all its passengers falling into the sea.

=== Survivors' accounts ===
Survivors' accounts of the incident dispute that of the coastguard. According to survivors, the inflatable speedboat was going straight at the time of the collision and there were no warning lights or sirens preceding it. Instead, a bright light shone from the left of the speedboat seconds before the patrol boat ran it over.

== See also ==
- 2023 Pylos migrant boat disaster
