= Minority Rights Group International =

Minority rights organisation

Minority Rights Group
- Founded: 1969
- Type: Non-governmental organisation
- Purpose: Minority rights Indigenous rights
- Location: London, United Kingdom
- Region served: Worldwide
- Website: minorityrights.org

Minority Rights Group (MRG) is an international human rights organisation, headquartered in London, with offices in Budapest and Kampala. The organisation's mission statement is to secure rights for ethnic, national, religious, linguistic minorities, and indigenous peoples around the world. MRG has an international Governing Council that meets twice a year. MRG has consultative status with the United Nations Economic and Social Council (ECOSOC) and observer status with the African Commission on Human and Peoples' Rights.

The organisation was set up in 1969 by a group of activists and academics in order "to protect the rights of minorities to co-exist with majorities, by objective study and consistent international public exposure of violations of fundamental rights as defined by the UN Charter". The organization is considered the main international advocacy organization in the field of minority rights, and has produced a directory of minorities that are persecuted or denied political representation.

Its first director was David Astor, editor and proprietor of The Observer newspaper at the time.

== See also ==
- Genocide
- Global Human Rights Defence
- Minority group
- Minority rights
- List of human rights organisations
