= Minority rights =

Rights of members of minority groups

Minority rights are the normal individual rights as applied to members of racial, ethnic, class, religious, linguistic or gender and sexual minorities, and also the collective rights accorded to any minority group. In modern liberal democracy, the protection of minority rights is the main principle.

Civil-rights movements often seek to ensure that individual rights are not denied on the basis of membership in a minority group. Such civil-rights advocates include the global women's-rights and global LGBT-rights movements, and various racial-minority rights movements around the world (such as the Civil Rights Movement in the United States).

Issues of minority rights intersect with debates over historical redress or over positive discrimination.

== History ==
Prior to the Paris Peace Conference (1919–1920), the term "minority" primarily referred to political parties in national legislatures, not ethnic, national, linguistic or religious groups. The Paris Conference has been attributed with coining the concept of minority rights and bringing prominence to it.

The issue of minority rights was first raised in 1814, at the Congress of Vienna, which discussed the fate of German Jews and especially of the Poles who were once again partitioned up. The Congress expressed hope that Prussia, Russia, and Austria would grant tolerance and protection to their minorities, which ultimately they disregarded, engaging in organized discrimination.

The 1856 Congress of Paris paid special attention to the status of Jews and Christians in the Ottoman Empire. In Britain, William Gladstone made the massacres of Bulgarians by the Ottoman Empire a major campaign issue and demanded international attention. The Congress of Berlin in 1878 dealt with the status of Jews in Romania, especially, and also Serbia, and Bulgaria. On the whole, the 19th-century congresses failed to impose significant reforms.

The first minority rights were proclaimed and enacted by the revolutionary Parliament of Hungary in July 1849. Minority rights were codified in Austrian law in 1867. Russia was especially active in protecting Orthodox Christians and Slavic peoples under the control of the Ottoman Empire. However the Russian government tolerated vicious pogroms against Jews in its villages. Russia was widely attacked for this policy. By contrast there was little or no international outrage regarding the treatment of other minorities, such as black people in the southern United States before the 1950s when African colonies became independent.

Before the World War I, only three European countries declared ethnic minority rights, and enacted minority-protecting laws: the first was Hungary (1849 and 1868), the second was Austria (1867), and the third was Belgium (1898). In the pre-WW1 era, the legal systems of other European countries did not allow the use of European minority languages in primary schools, in cultural institutions, in offices of public administration and at the legal courts.

=== Minority rights at the Paris Peace Conference of 1919 ===
At the Versailles Peace Conference the Supreme Council established 'The Committee on New States and for The Protection of Minorities'. All the new successor states were compelled to sign minority rights treaties as a precondition of diplomatic recognition. It was agreed that although the new states had been recognized, they had not been 'created' before the signatures of the final peace treaties. The issue of German and Polish rights was a point of dispute as Polish rights in Germany remained unprotected, unlike the German minority in Poland. Like other principles adopted by the League, the Minorities Treaties were a part of the Wilsonian idealist approach to international relations; like the League itself, the Minority Treaties were increasingly ignored by the respective governments, with the entire system mostly collapsing in the late 1930s. Despite the political failure, they remained the basis of international law. After World War II, the legal principles were incorporated in the UN Charter and a host of international human rights treaties.

=== International law ===
Minority rights, as applying to ethnic, religious or linguistic minorities and indigenous peoples, are an integral part of international human rights law. Like children's rights, women's rights and refugee rights, minority rights are a legal framework designed to ensure that a specific group which is in a vulnerable, disadvantaged or marginalized position in society, is able to achieve equality and is protected from persecution. The first postwar international treaty to protect minorities, designed to protect them from the greatest threat to their existence, was the Convention on the Prevention and Punishment of the Crime of Genocide.

Subsequent human rights standards that codify minority rights include the International Covenant on Civil and Political Rights (Article 27), the United Nations Declaration on the Rights of Persons Belonging to National or Ethnic, Religious and Linguistic Minorities, two Council of Europe treaties (the Framework Convention for the Protection of National Minorities and the European Charter for Regional or Minority Languages), and the Organization for Security and Co-operation in Europe (OSCE) Copenhagen Document of 1990.

Minority rights cover protection of existence, protection from discrimination and persecution, protection and promotion of identity, and participation in political life. For the rights of LGBT people, the Yogyakarta Principles have been approved by the United Nations Human Rights Council. For the rights of persons with disabilities, the Convention on the Rights of Persons with Disabilities has been adopted by United Nations General Assembly.

To protect minority rights, many countries have specific laws and/or commissions or ombudsman institutions (for example the Hungarian Parliamentary Commissioner for National and Ethnic Minorities Rights).

While initially, the United Nations treated indigenous peoples as a sub-category of minorities, there is an expanding body of international law specifically devoted to them, in particular Convention 169 of the International Labour Organization and the UN Declaration on the Rights of Indigenous Peoples (adopted 14 September 2007).

In 2008, a declaration on LGBT rights was presented in the UN General Assembly, and in 2011, an LGBT rights resolution was passed in the United Nations Human Rights Council (See LGBT rights at the United Nations).

There are many political bodies which also feature minority group rights, which might be seen in affirmative action quotas or in guaranteed minority representation in a consociational state.

== National minorities in the law of the EC/EU ==
The direct role of the European Union (and also the law of the EU/EC) in the area of protection of national minorities is still very limited (likewise the general protection of human rights). The EU has relied on general international law and a European regional system of international law (based on the Council of Europe, Organization for Security and Co-operation in Europe, etc.) and in a case of necessity accepted their norms. But the "de-economisation of European integration", which started in the 1990s, is changing this situation. The political relevance of national minorities' protection is very high.

Now (2009), although protection of the national minorities has not become a generally accepted legally binding principle of the EU, in several legal acts issues of national minorities are mentioned. In external relations protection of national minorities became one of the main criteria for cooperation with the EU or accession.

== See also ==
- Civil rights
- Cultural rights
- Disability rights movement
- European Centre for Minority Issues
- European Roma Rights Centre
- Global Human Rights Defence
- Intersex human rights
- Individual and group rights
- Linguistic rights
- Minority Rights Group International
- Minoritarianism
- Tyranny of the majority
- Ethnic party

== Bibliography ==
- Azcarate, P. de. League of Nations and National Minorities (1945) online
- Barzilai, G. 2003. Communities and Law: Politics and Cultures of Legal Identities. Ann Arbor: University of Michigan Press.
- Fink, Carole. 2006. Defending the Rights of Others: The Great Powers, the Jews, and International Minority Protection, 1878–1938 excerpt and text search
- Henrard, K. 2000. Devising an Adequate System of Minority Protection: Individual Human Rights, Minority Rights, and the Right to Self-Determination Leiden: Martinus Nijhoff Publishers
- Jackson Preece, J. 2005. Minority Rights: Between Diversity and Community Cambridge: Polity Press
- Malloy, T.H. 2005. National Minority Rights in Europe Oxford and New York: Oxford University Press.
- Pentassuglia, G. 2002. Minorities in international law: an introductory study Strasbourg: Council of Europe Publications
- Šmihula, D. 2008. "National Minorities in the Law of the EC/EU", Romanian Journal of European Affairs, Vol. 8 no. 3, pp. 2008, pp. 51–81. online
- Thornberry, P. 1991. International Law and the Rights of Minorities. Oxford: Clarendon Press
- Weller, M. (ed.) 2006. The Rights of Minorities in Europe: A Commentary on the European Framework Convention for the Protection of National Minorities. Oxford and New York: Oxford University Press.
- Weller, M., Denika Blacklock and Katherine Nobbs (eds.) 2008. The Protection of Minorities in the Wider Europe Basingstoke and New York: Palgrave Macmillan.

=== Links ===
- Gabriel N. Toggenburg, Minority Protection and the European Union, OSI, Budapest 2004
- Gabriel N. Toggenburg / Günther Rautz, Das ABC des Minderheitenschutz in Europa, Böhlau, Wien 2010
- Gabriel N. Toggenburg, The Union's role vis-a-vis its minorities after the enlargement decade: a remaining share or a new part?, European University Institute, Florence 2006
