= Andreas Apostolopoulos =

Greek-Canadian billionaire (1952–2021)

- Ανδρέας Αποστολόπουλος
- Born: 1952; Kalamata, Greece
- Died: 15 February 2021 (aged 69)
- Occupation: Businessman
- Children: Steve Apostolopoulos

Andreas Apostolopoulos (1952 – 15 February 2021) was a Greek-Canadian billionaire businessman, primarily concentrated on real estate investment and redevelopment. He is best known for his ownership of the Silverdome in Pontiac, Michigan. The Apostolopoulos family is one of the richest Greek families in the United States and the richest Greek family in Canada. He died on 15 February 2021.

== Biography ==
Born in the port city of Kalamata, Greece, Apostolopoulos emigrated to Canada in 1969. Starting as a labourer and janitor, he progressed to owning small service and manufacturing companies, paving the way to commercial real estate investment and redevelopment. He was the chairman of Triple Group of Companies, based in Toronto, Ontario.

== Silverdome purchase ==
Apostolopoulos made international news in 2009 when his investment company purchased the Pontiac Silverdome at auction for $583,000. A low purchase price for an 82,000-seat stadium that had been constructed in 1975 for $55.7 million ($220 million in 2009). Apostolopoulos's company Triple Sports and Entertainment managed and operated the Silverdome as a sports and entertainment venue, investing millions of dollars to bring back the stadium to its original condition hosting many events, the first event at the Silverdome under his ownership was a monster truck and motorsports show on 17 April 2010.

The stadium has since been imploded and will be completely demolished and prepared for future development.

== Durham Live casino ==
Durham Live is a $1.3 billion entertainment district that is in the process of being developed in south Pickering in the Canadian city of Pickering, Ontario. The plan received approval for development in 2017. It will contribute $600 million in tax revenue and $1 billion towards Pickering's GDP and represents the largest private investment in Pickering's history. 61% of Pickering residents voted in favor of the development. According to Universal City Condominiums, a condo developer near the Durham Live development site, "Durham Live" will include "a massive casino, hotel, film studio, theatre, waterpark, big box retail, luxury stores, golf course, performance hall, and gourmet dining".

== Duffins Creek wetland controversy ==
In early March 2021, Triple Group received significant negative press for plans to rezone a protected wetland for development into an Amazon warehouse. Environmental groups filed a court injunction to prevent the project from going forward. On March 12, Amazon announced that they were no longer considering the site for their warehouse. In November 2022, news came out that 90% of the wetland had been cleared and tilled.

== Detroit Penobscot building ==
The Penobscot building, is a class-A office tower complex consisting of three office towers in Downtown Detroit, Michigan. The 1928 Art Deco building is located in the heart of the Detroit Financial District. The Penobscot is a hub for the city's wireless Internet zone and fiber-optic network. The Penobscot building is on the National Register of Historical Properties and was purchased in 2012 by Triple Properties Inc. The firm purchased the building when the property was in foreclosure during Detroit's worst economic recession in history. The Penobscot building, once considered a crown jewel of downtown Detroit's real estate domain, has suffered from extensive neglect by Apostolopoulos' property management company in recent years. In early 2020, Triple Group received hundreds of fines and violations with penalties, totalling tens of thousands of dollars, for conditions including rodent infestation and solid waste buildup.
