= Aicha Duihi =

President of the Sahara Observatory

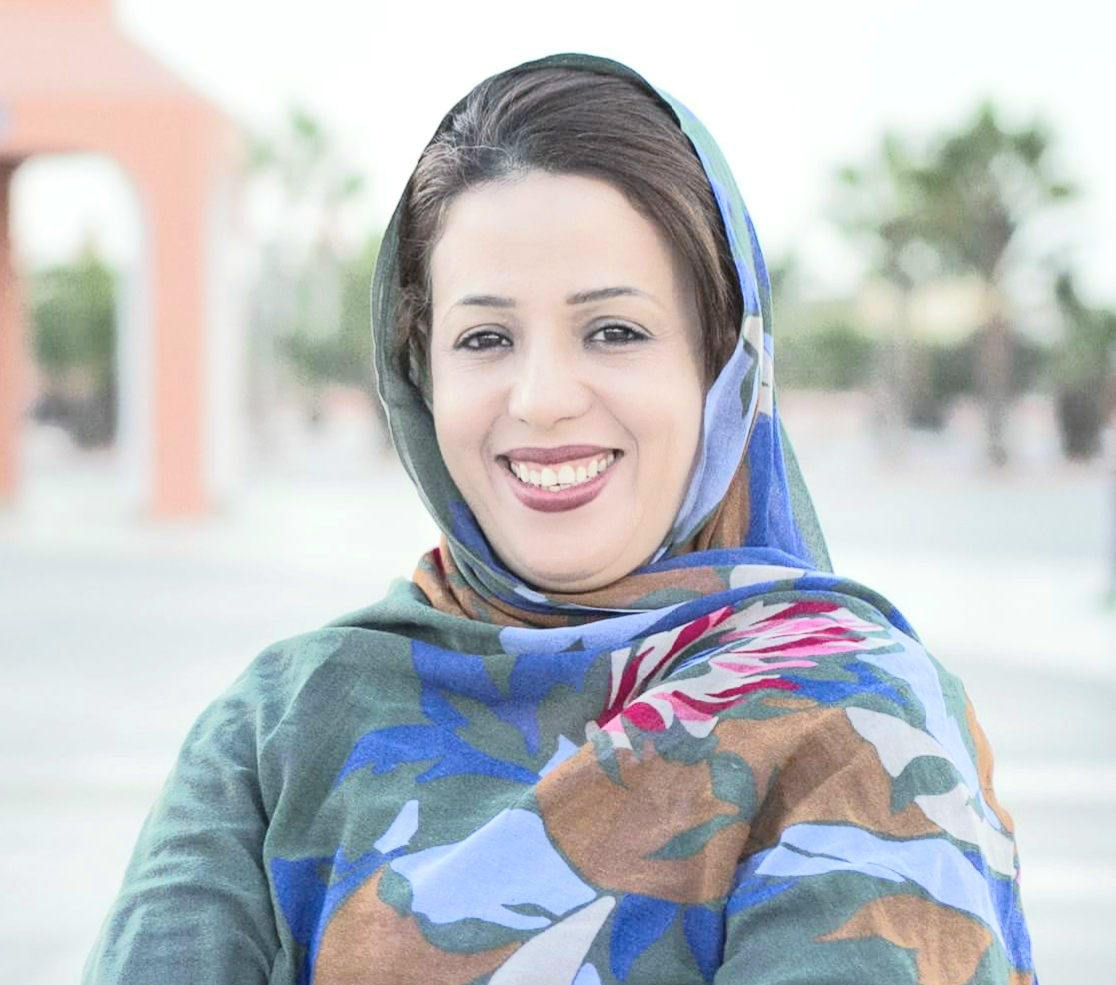
- Education: Institute of Business Administration, postgraduate DESA degree in economics of organizations
- Occupation: Human rights activist
- Organization(s): Sahara Observatory for Peace, Democracy and Human Rights
- Website: saharaobservatory.org at the Wayback Machine (archived 29 January 2019)

Aicha Duihi (Arabic: عائشة الدويهي) is a Moroccan Sahrawi human rights activist who is the president of the Sahara Observatory for Peace, Democracy and Human Rights. Duihi has advocated against the Polisario Front's camps in the Tindouf Province of Southwestern Algeria on the border of Western Sahara, and serves as a spokesperson for those kidnapped and those being held captive in the Polisario camps. She seeks to combat propaganda and misinformation which further marginalise vulnerable women.

In 2019, Duihi earned the European Prize for International Women's Leadership in the European Parliament.

== Activism ==
As president of the Sahara Observatory, Duihi is responsible for communicating with other NGOs about areas of concern and interest. With the Independent Human Rights Network and Sahara League for Democracy and Human Rights, Duihi issued a statement condemning international silence on the state of Polisario camps in Tindouf and Lahmada, specifically calling out arbitrary trials and the arrests of journalists and other human rights activists.

Duihi has also lobbied the United Nations Security Council to address inequality and discrimination based on sex in regards to the role of women in establishing peace in the region. To this end, she has contributed to the creation of numerous citizens' initiatives and projects targeting the improved well-being of children, as well as initiatives seeking to curb human trafficking.

Duihi has praised the efforts of the Equity and Reconciliation Commission and reforms carried out after the adoption of the 2011 constitutional reforms in Morocco.

=== COVID-19 pandemic ===
In 2020 Duihi created a program called "Afgarich Sahara" (Heroes of the Sahara) which was aimed towards children in the region, giving them the opportunity to share their distance learning and quarantine experiences during COVID-19 as well as contributing to culture, art, and creativity on an online platform to foster a positive atmosphere in households. Her organization, the Sahara Observatory (OSPDH), carried out public education efforts in support of social distancing measures while also monitoring rights and freedoms that could be curtailed by quarantine measures. For instance, the OSPDH organized distance learning sessions for youth leaders on civil advocacy and reporting, and for women's rights defenders in the Middle East and North Africa region, with particular focus on the violence against women during the COVID-19 pandemic.
