= Border Violence Monitoring Network =

- Founded: 2016; 10 years ago
- Type: Non-profit NGO
- Purpose: Human rights, Activism
- Region served: Europe and the Western Balkans
- Fields: Human Rights Monitoring, Legal and Political Advocacy, Campaigns, Research
- Website: www.borderviolence.eu

The Border Violence Monitoring Network (BVMN) is a coalition of over 12 organizations whose stated goal is "documenting illegal pushbacks & police violence by EU [European Union] member state authorities in the Western Balkans and Greece". The organization was founded in 2017 and is regarded as an authoritative source on pushbacks and refugee protection.

In 2018, BVMN recorded video footage of pushbacks along the Croatian–Bosnian border, which was widely circulated online. In 2019, it reported 3,251 pushbacks either from Croatia to Bosnia and Herzegovina or from Greece to Turkey. To date, BVMN has documented over 1387 pushbacks from 16 countries.

== Key Publications ==
=== Black Book of Pushbacks ===
In December 2020, it published the Black Book of Pushbacks, a two-volume work that documents the experiences of 12,654 migrants who suffered from human rights violations while traveling on the Balkan route in the previous four years, in collaboration with the United Left group in the European Parliament. At the book launch, German MEP Cornelia Ernst called the incidents described in the book "reminiscent of brutal dictatorships" and said that she hopes the book "will contribute to bringing an end to these crimes and holding the governments that are responsible accountable".

=== Torture Report ===
In 2020, BVMN released a 51-page report into the use of torture or other inhuman treatment during pushbacks. This report was based upon 286 statements from migrants and refugees. Among the BVMN's findings is that in 2020, 90% of pushed-back migrants interviewed experienced "some form of degrading treatment or torture" from border guards. According to the BVMN's report, the most common form of violence during pushbacks is beating or kicking migrants, including the use of dogs or attempted lynching. Use of electric weapons has been reported against 362 people. Thirty-seven percent of migrants reported being forced to undress, which almost doubled compared to 2019. In some cases, the migrants' clothes were burned so that they were forced back across the border while naked, or they were detained while naked. Twenty-three percent of cases involved threats with firearms.

=== Monthly Report ===
Every month the Border Violence Monitoring Network publishes a report summarizing recent trends in pushbacks and other important developments. The report brings together first-hand testimonies from a range of countries in the Balkans, Poland, Turkey, and France to look at the way European Union states and other actors are affecting systemic violence towards people crossing borders.

== Structure ==
=== Member Organizations ===
BVMN works via a horizontal network of member groups. The members are NGOs, co-ops, collectives and grassroots initiatives spread across the Balkans, Poland, France, Greece and Turkey. Members sit on an open assembly, and each contribute to various different working groups within BVMN. The following organization are named members within the Border Violence Monitoring Network, but some members choose to remain anonymous.

1. Blindspots
2. Collective Aid
3. Mobile Info Team
4. Rigardu eV
5. I Have Rights
6. Pushback Alarm Austria
7. Center for Legal Aid - Voice in Bulgaria
8. Mission Wings
9. We Are Monitoring
10. Legal Centre Lesvos
11. Infopark
12. Human Rights Observers

== Funding and Finances ==
The finances of the Border Violence Monitoring Network are based on:

- Funds from Foundations and Grants
- Member fees from BVMN's legal frame Rigardu e.V.
- Donations from BVMN supporters

BVMN currently receives or has received support from the following foundations:

- Open Society Foundations
- European Programme for Integration and Migration
- European Cultural Foundation
- Safe Passage Fund
- Sigrid Rausing Trust
- The Fund for Global Human Rights
- Heinrich Böll Foundation
- Privacy International
- Pro Asyl
- Brot für die Welt
- Guerilla Foundation
- Fondation Un Monde Par Tous
- The Global Whole Being Fund
- RiVolti ai Balcani
- Front Line Defenders
- Freedom House
