= Pickering Casino Resort =

- Entertainment Complex
- Interactive map of Pickering Casino Resort
- Coordinates: 43.839309°N 79.054092°W
- Country: Canada
- Province: Ontario
- City: Pickering
- Website: greatcanadian.com/destinations/ontario/pickering/

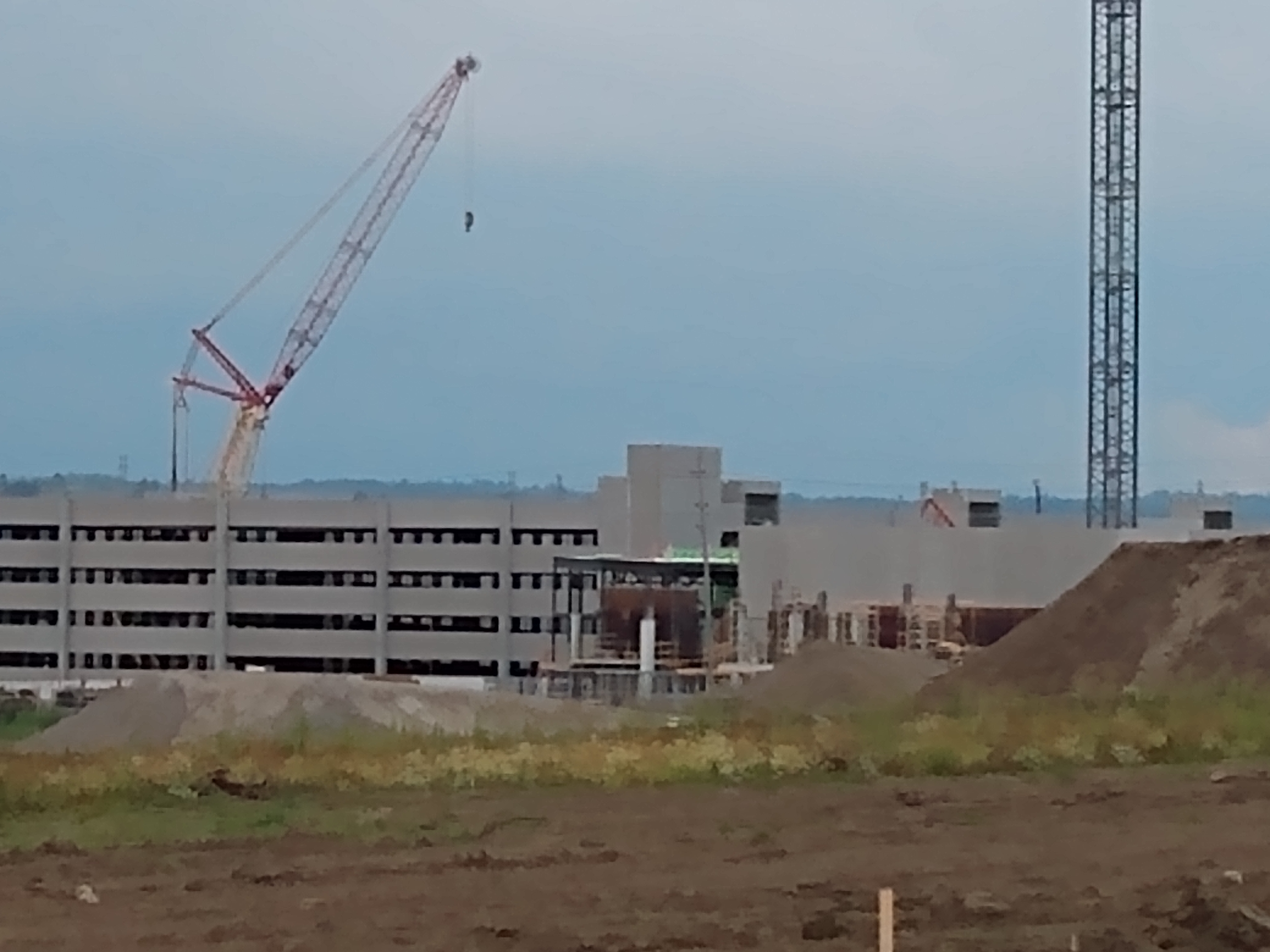
Construction in progress, August 2019

The Pickering Casino Resort is a casino, resort, and entertainment venue that is currently under development in the Canadian city of Pickering, Ontario. The resort is part of a wider entertainment complex called Durham Live.

== History ==
The plan received approval for development in 2017. It is expected to create 10,000 jobs in the city of Pickering ranging from entry level to senior managerial positions. It is also expected to contribute $600 million in tax revenue and $1 billion towards Pickering's GDP and represents the largest private investment in Pickering's history. 60% of Pickering residents voted in favor of the development. According to Universal City Condominiums, a condo developer near the resort development site, Pickering Casino Resort will include "A World-Class Casino, A Giant Amphitheatre (capacity of 16,000), State-of-the-Art Cinemas and Film Studio, A Five Star Restaurant Strip, Three Luxury Hotels, Shopping Mall, A Fitness Centre and Spa, a Botanical Garden..." It will also include Canada's first and North America's third Porsche Experience Center. The facility was expected to be operational in the fall of 2019 or by late 2019. Construction of the structures are in the advanced stages. The building permit for the city of Pickering to go ahead with this development has cost $1.6 million.

The City of Pickering, the Durham Region and Toronto governing authorities are actively involved in this project due to the magnitude of investment and effects on zoning bylaws.

The first phase of the development, the casino, was opened to the general public on July 26, 2021.
