= Pushbacks by Greece =

Pushback of migrants and refugees

Since at least 2008, Greece has pushed back tens of thousands of migrants, especially at the Evros border with Turkey and in the Aegean Sea. On land, the pushbacks involve taking people who have arrived at the Greek side of the border and transferring them to the Turkish side. Maritime pushbacks typically involve taking migrants who have either entered Greek territorial waters or landed on Greek islands and depositing them in Turkish territorial waters on craft without any means of propulsion. The number of pushbacks has increased following the European migrant crisis and breakdown in EU–Turkey relations in 2020.

The term "pushback" refers to informal returns of people against their will and outside any legal framework. It is a human rights violation both because of the risk of refoulement as well as the violence and danger to which people are exposed during pushbacks. In 2021, Amnesty International reported that pushbacks had become Greece's "de facto border policy". The Greek government officially denies taking part in pushbacks. The role of Frontex, the EU border agency, in pushbacks in Greece has been the subject of multiple investigations by the European Parliament, EU anti-fraud agency OLAF, and European Ombudsman.

== Definition ==
Pushback is a non-legal term that refers to "informal collective forced returns of people who irregularly enter the country back to the country they entered from, via procedures that take place outside legally defined rules in protocols or agreements signed by the neighbouring countries". There is debate over whether pushback is the right term as it refers to the international law obligation of non-refoulement which is not the only human rights issue with some of the tactics used by Greece to reject migrants, and in particular pushback "may fail to capture the egregiousness" of the violations.

== Legality ==
Pushbacks violate the EU Charter of Fundamental Rights and other treaties to which Greece is a party. According to Greek Council of Refugees, pushbacks also violate the Greek constitution.

In April 2018, the Committee for the Prevention of Torture reported that it "received several consistent and credible allegations of informal forcible removals (push-backs) of foreign nationals by boat from Greece to Turkey at the Evros River border by masked Greek police and border guards or (para-)military commandos. In a number of these cases, the persons concerned alleged that they had been ill-treated and, in particular, subjected to baton blows after they had been made to kneel face-down on the boat during the push-back operations". CPT urged the Greek authorities to avoid any type of pushback.

In 2021, the Council of Europe's Commissioner for Human Rights, Dunja Mijatović, urged Greece to put an end to pushbacks of migrants because "member states cannot satisfy themselves that they are not sending individuals back in violation of, for example, Article 3 of the European Convention on Human Rights and the refoulement prohibition in the UN Refugee Convention". Mijatović also stated that "the way in which these operations are reportedly carried out would clearly be incompatible with Greece's human rights obligations".

In 2021 the European Commission refused to release funds for border operations until Greece agrees to establish an independent body to investigate allegations of human rights abuses against migrants.

=== Domestic law ===
In June 2021, the Greek government designated Turkey as a safe third country for nationals from Syria, Afghanistan, Pakistan, Bangladesh, and Somalia; stating that "they are not in any danger ... due to their race, religion, citizenship, political beliefs or membership in some particular social group, and can seek asylum in Turkey instead of in Greece." In theory, this would allow Greece to deport more irregular migrants to Turkey, although Turkey has been reluctant to accept returned migrants from Greece. In 2020, about two-thirds of requests for asylum in Greece were from nationals of these countries; Somali and Afghan claims had a 94% and 66% recognition rate respectively. Migrant advocates criticized the decision because Turkey does not have a functioning asylum system and returns people to countries where they face a risk.

In 2021 the Supreme Court of Greece ordered prosecutors to investigate cases of pushbacks reported by Greek Helsinki Monitor.

== Safety ==
Topographic map of Greece and the Aegean. Lesvos, Chios, and Samos are large islands located near the Turkish coast

Pushbacks at sea come in two main types. In the first and most common, vessels that have entered Greek territorial waters are turned around and disabled in Turkish waters. In the second type, migrants who have reached Greek land are put on rafts with no means of propulsion and left in the middle of the sea. Greece uses inflatable rafts intended for use as lifeboats, to put pushed-back migrants after taking them by water to near the Turkish coast and leaving them stranded there. Both Hellenic and Turkish Coast Guard frequently push boats by maneuvering at high speed in circles around the vessel. This practice is hazardous both because of the risk of collision and because overcrowded and unseaworthy dinghies could capsize in the resulting waves. Der Spiegel reports that Hellenic Coast Guard often use violence during these actions, stab migrant boats or shoot into the water. Maritime pushbacks also entail the risk that the small boats could be run over by larger vessels unaware of their presence.

After the 2016 EU–Turkey migration deal the Turkish Coast Guard has also been observed using unsafe tactics to prevent migrants from leaving, including circling rafts at high speed and throwing rocks. Keady-Tabbal and Mann state, "Often, it seems like the two countries are playing a violent game of ping-pong across the Aegean with migrant bodies." Mare Liberum e. V. estimates that until 2020, pullbacks by Turkish Coast Guard outnumbered pushbacks by Greek authorities in the Aegean. In these cases, the boats did not enter Greek territorial waters. This changed in February 2020, when Turkish president Erdogan pushed thousands of refugees to the Turkish-Greek border. Pushbacks often involve standoffs between Turkish and Hellenic Coast Guard in which both will refuse aid to a vessel in distress and maneuver in an unsafe way around the vessel. The practice in which some migrants are pushed back and forth across the Aegean has been dubbed "Greek water polo" by locals.

Greece–Turkey land border

=== Incommunicado detention ===
In March 2020, The New York Times reported that Greece was detaining migrants at a "secret extrajudicial location" or "black site" in the municipality of Poros near the Evros river before pushing them back to Turkey. Migrants reported arbitrary detention as well as being forced to sign documents in languages that they did not understand. They reported being arrested by Greek police, held in detention, and then transferred at night to unidentified men wearing black masks who carried out the pushback.

In 2019, the European Committee for the Prevention of Torture found that the Greek authorities had forcibly disappeared migrants prior to pushbacks, although Greek authorities rejected this finding. In international law, a forced disappearance is defined as "the deprivation of liberty with the authorization, support, or acquiescence of a State, followed by a refusal to acknowledge the deprivation of liberty or concealment of the fate or whereabouts of this person".

In 2021, a Syrian who had been granted protection in Germany filed a complaint against Greece at the United Nations Human Rights Committee on the basis that his pushback at the Evros river in 2016 constituted a forced disappearance. According to Grażyna Baranowska, an expert on forced disappearances, another case of forced disappearance during a pushback (involving the Turkish national Ayşe Erdoğan in May 2019) appeared to violate the international convention. Erdoğan, who was politically persecuted in Turkey, had applied for asylum at a Greek police station. While she was detained, her brother inquired about her whereabouts but the police station denied that she was held there. Later, she was pushed back by masked men across the Evros border. In Turkey, she was arrested and sentenced to six years and three months in jail.

== Incidents ==
German researcher Laura Graf states that "illegal rejections, especially at the EU's external borders, have long been a functional component of EU border protection", and were systematically practiced in Greece before 2015. In 2008 Human Rights Watch published a book stating that Greek authorities regularly carried out pushbacks of asylum seekers both at the Evros and in the Aegean. A 2014 academic paper states that many migrants had been pushed back by Greek authorities and Frontex along the Evros river and in the Aegean.

In February 2020, Turkey announced that it would no longer prevent Syrians from leaving and bussed some to the border. There was also at least one case in which migrants were coerced into leaving Turkey. Following this escalation, Greece violently pushed back migrants both at its land and sea border, attracting international media attention. Some Frontex crews refused to participate in the pushbacks. Only a few hundred arrivals were recorded. In mid-March, Turkey quietly changed its policy and resumed intercepting migrants, during the growth of COVID-19 cases in Turkey.

=== Aegean ===
The widely reported Farmakonisi pushback on 20 January 2014 resulted in 11 Afghans, including 8 children, losing their lives after their boat capsized while being towed at high speed through rough waters by the Greek Coast Guard. No rescue was attempted. Several survivors sued Greece in the European Court of Human Rights. In October 2016, a Syrian family was flown from Kos to Turkey after being promised that they were going to Athens.

On 2 March 2020, Hellenic Coast Guard pushed back an inflatable dinghy in Greek territorial waters near Kos by making waves near the vessel, shooting into the water, and using batons on the dinghy. On 4 June, masked men aboard a RHIB that appeared to belong to the Hellenic Coast Guard pushed back migrants near Lesvos. On 20 October, a boat containing 180–200 people intending to seek asylum in Italy was caught in a storm near Crete and offered rescue. Instead, it was subjected to a violent attack, theft and threat of additional violence by the Hellenic Coast Guard. The migrants were subsequently boarded onto coast guard boats and were found abandoned in life rafts the next day. Legal Centre Lesvos has filed an ECtHR case on behalf of some of the survivors of this incident. On 25 December 2020, Turkish Coast Guard vessels videotaped Greek Coast Guard leaving migrants stranded in the sea in a rubber boat.

Between 21 and 22 April 2021, 28 people were pushed back from Samos and subsequently rescued by the Turkish Coast Guard near the Turkish coast. In July 2021, 35 Sorani-speaking migrants from Iraqi Kurdistan, intending to reach Italy, landed on the island of Antikythera having traveled more than 370 kilometres (230 mi) from Turkey. They were taken by boat to outside of İzmir where they were left in rafts and eventually rescued by the Turkish Coast Guard.

Hellenic Coast Guard officials interviewed by Der Spiegel identified the elite coast guard units MYA and KEA as the men wearing balaclava masks to avoid identification during pushbacks. One retired official stated, "Orders are always oral in these operations", to maintain plausible deniability, and "The instructions come from way up top, from politicians." The emblem of the OEA unit (part of KEA) was captured in video of one pushback.

== Estimates ==
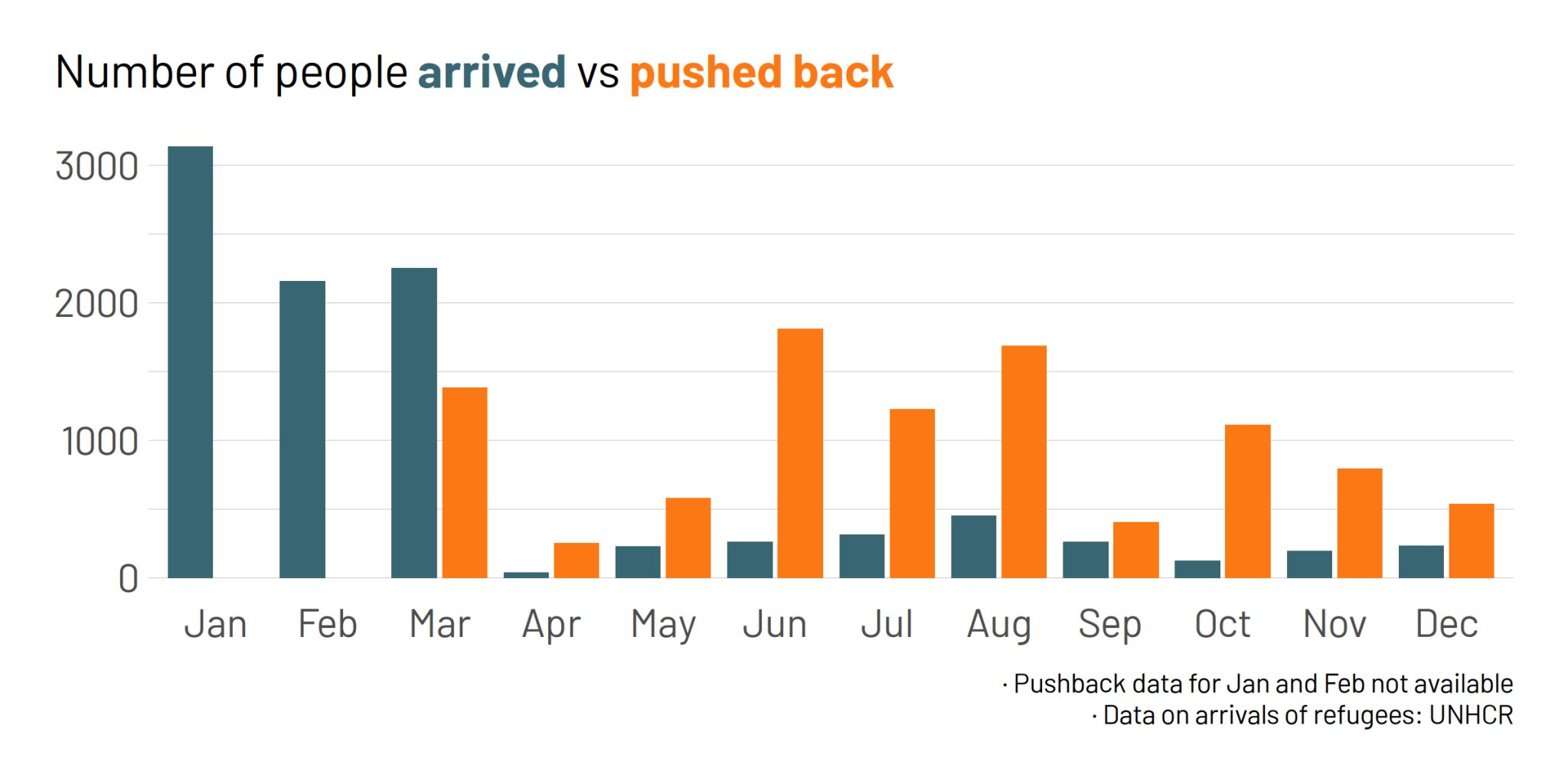
Pushbacks and arrivals on Greece's Aegean border during 2020 according to Mare Liberum e.V.

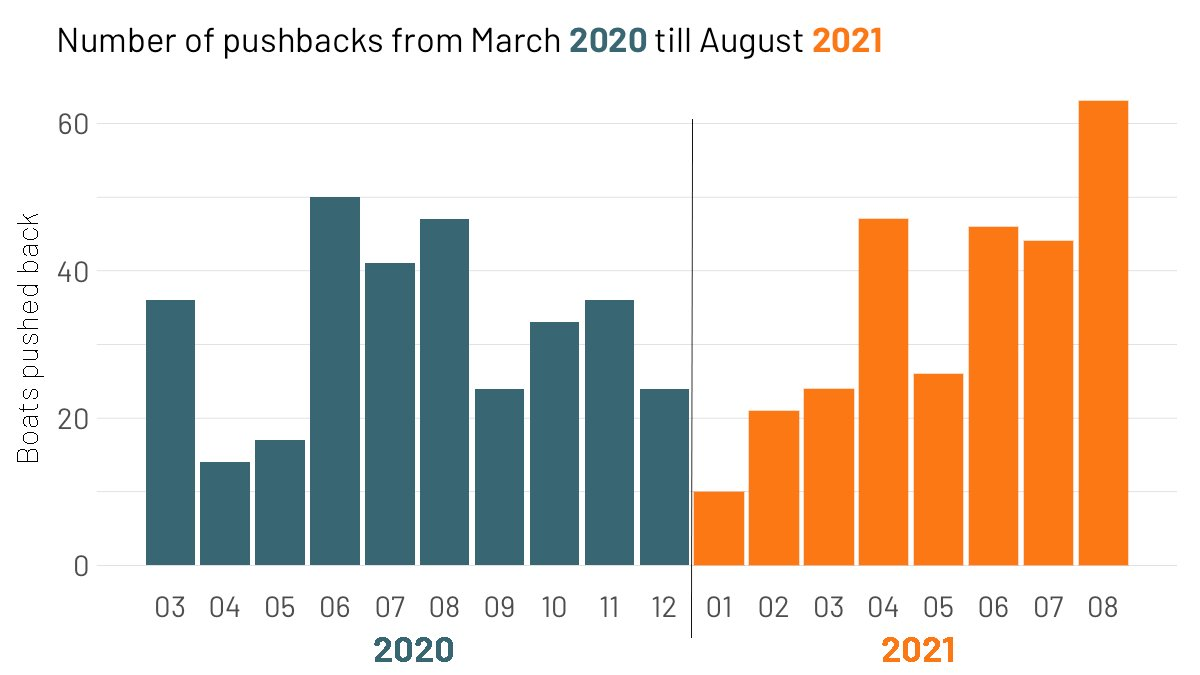
Pushbacks on Greece's Aegean border from March 2020 to August 2021 according to Mare Liberum

According to the Turkish interior ministry, Greece illegally deported 58,283 migrants to Turkey in the 12 months before 1 November 2018, but Greece disputes this. These deportations according to Turkey were in contravention of the EU–Turkey agreement under which Turkey would only accept returned migrants if they were evaluated for asylum and their claim was denied.

An investigation of pushbacks between 2017 and 2020 on the Evros border by the Greek ombudsman found a consistent pattern of reports of illegal pushbacks that the authorities had not investigated. Border Violence Monitoring Network recorded 89 pushback incidents in 2020 affecting 4,500 people at Greece's land border with Turkey. 52% of these groups included minors. In 89% of these incidents, migrants were subjected to "disproportionate and excessive use of force", including beatings (some inflicted with metal rods, batons, and heavy boots) and immersion in water. Some migrants suffered serious injury such as unconsciousness or broken bones. Electric weapons were reported in 10% of cases. Some people, including minors, were deprived of their clothes and forced back across the Evros while naked. Since 2020 some migrants have been arrested far from the border in places such as Thessaloniki, taken to the Evros border and pushed back.

Mare Liberum e.V. counted 321 pushbacks in the Aegean in 2020, affecting 9,798 people. The group estimates that 4,700 people have been abandoned on life rafts by the Greek Coast Guard in the Aegean since March 2020, a twice weekly occurrence. Mare Liberum also says there have been at least 17 instances in 2021 where Greek Coast Guard has dropped people in the water without a boat or life vest. At least 3 people died as a result.

Greek minister of shipping Ioannis Plakiotakis said in September 2020 that 10,000 people had been prevented from reaching Greece.

== Greek government position ==
On 1 March 2020, the prime minister of Greece, Kyriakos Mitsotakis, tweeted "Once more, do not attempt to enter Greece illegally – you will be turned back." In August 2020 he told CNN that reports of pushbacks were "misinformation" that originated in Turkey. In February 2021, Greece's minister for migration Notis Mitarachi said that allegations of pushbacks are "part of a broader fake news strategy promoted by Turkey, through certain non-government organisations and smuggler networks". Greece has accused Turkey of trying to weaponize migrants in order to obtain more money from the European Union.

In November 2021, Dutch reporter Ingeborg Beugel, from De Groene Amsterdammer, asked Greek Prime Minister Kyriakos Mitsotakis during a news conference about Greece practicing pushbacks. Mitsotakis answered denying any wrongdoing by Greece, stating that Greek policy is in line with EU policy and that Greece has saved thousands of lives, while also blaming Turkey for "instrumentalizing" refugees despite being a safe country. Additionally, the Prime Minister of the Netherlands, Mark Rutte, who was present, defended the Greek government, stating that the Greek government's investigation of the issue of the pushbacks was evidence of their "applying the highest standards" and that Greece was protecting the EU's outer border. Subsequently, Beugel reported being subjected to threats and violence; after consulting the Dutch embassy in Athens, she decided to leave Greece.

== Frontex involvement ==
In November 2020, Greek newspaper Efimerida ton Syntakton published a leaked document from Frontex, the EU border agency, containing accounts of maritime pushbacks in the Aegean, but they were labeled "prevention of departure". On the same dates and sometimes the same times that Frontex states the migrants returned to Turkish territorial waters of their own initiative, human rights organizations reported coercive pushbacks.

Although Frontex aircraft and ships in the Aegean operate with their location transponders turned off to avoid tracking, with video and photographic evidence they have been identified in the vicinity of six pushbacks between April and October 2020. In one incident, Syrian migrants landed on Samos on 28 April 2020 and planned to apply for asylum. Instead, the Greek Coast Guard towed them out to sea over the night and following morning. A Frontex plane designed to detect small vessels overflew them twice but they were not offered assistance despite being in distress. On 8 June, a Romanian Frontex boat MAI 1103 physically blocked a boat of migrants, passed them at high-speed generating waves, and then left at which point the Hellenic Coast Guard carried out a pushback. In another incident on 15 August, a Romanian Frontex boat was present (a few hundred meters away) as a dinghy containing Syrian migrants was repeatedly pushed back by the Hellenic Coast Guard as well as the Turkish Coast Guard. The Romanian Frontex vessel also made waves that disturbed the dinghy, a safety hazard. Regarding the second incident, international law expert Dana Schmalz said that if Frontex stopped an overcrowded boat of refugees, they would have to render assistance under international maritime law. These incidents were uncovered as part of a months-long investigation by Lighthouse Reports, Bellingcat, TV Asahi, Der Spiegel, and ARD, that "proves for the first time that Frontex officials know about the Greek border guards’ illegal practices – and that the agency itself is at times involved in the pushbacks".

Following these media reports, European Commissioner for Home Affairs Ylva Johansson called an extraordinary meeting of the Frontex board and EU Ombudsman opened an inquiry. In December 2020, Frontex head Fabrice Leggeri appeared in front of the European Parliament Committee on Civil Liberties, Justice and Home Affairs (LIBE) during which he faced questioning about the organization's role in pushbacks in Greece. He denied Frontex involvement. S&D group called for his resignation. EU anti-fraud agency OLAF also opened an investigation into Frontex for violating EU law, including pushbacks. LIBE subsequently investigated Frontex, finding that the agency turned a blind eye to fundamental rights violations and ignored its duty to report them. Internal emails reviewed by MEPs indicated that Leggeri had ordered the destruction of evidence related to a pushback on 18–19 April 2020. In May 2021 Front-Lex association filed a case against Frontex at the EU Court of Justice based on its alleged pushback involvement.

At Greece's land borders, migrants have reported being pushed back by people wearing Frontex armbands or speaking German. In 2021 Amnesty International called on Frontex to suspend its operations in Greece, stating: "All of the people we spoke to were pushed back from areas where Frontex has significant numbers of staff." The life rafts used in pushbacks were paid for by a European Union contract with Greek company Lalizas and cost EUR1,590 each.

Frontex denies taking part in pushbacks or knowing that they take place in Greece.

== See also ==
- Population exchange between Greece and Turkey
