= Ingeborg Beugel =

Dutch journalist

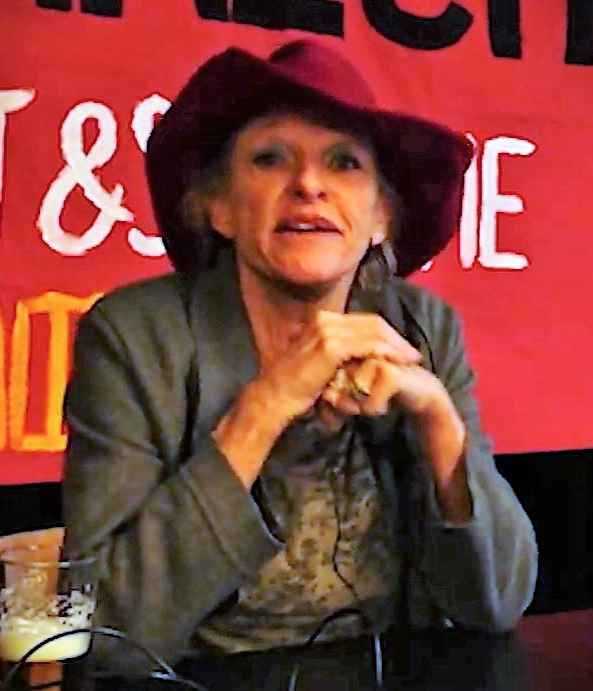
Beugel speaks on SocialistTV in 2021

Ingeborg Beugel (born 1960) is a Dutch freelance correspondent. Based in Greece, she had to temporarily leave the country in November 2021 after publicly questioning the Greek Prime Minister about pushbacks in Greece.

== Early life ==
Beugel was born in 1960 to an educated family with left-wing political inclinations. She spent her early childhood in the Hague, but the family moved to Brussels, Belgium at the age of 11 as her father, a stockbroker, had taken up a job there. She then moved to Amsterdam at the age of 18 to study history. In her final year of university, Beugel went to Athens to interview a Greek minister for NRC Handelsblad. During this time, she fell in love with an official from the ministry and ended up moving to Greece before her graduation. They then married and had two children.

== Career ==
Following her relocation to Greece, Beugel started working as a freelance journalist. She resided on the island of Hydra "for almost 40 years". In 1994, reporting for Elsevier, she travelled with a Greek humanitarian aid convoy during the Bosnian War. This convoy, which was sent for the Bosnian Serbs, passed through areas where Bosnian Muslims had been targeted by the Serb forces in their acts of ethnic cleansing. Beugel reported being "physically prevented" from speaking to Muslims by the Greek authorities in charge of the convoy.

She worked as a documentary producer for the Dutch public broadcaster IKON. She produced the film Geloof, seks en wanhoof about love and sexuality in an increasingly multicultural Netherlands. In 2014, she made the documentary film Uitgebloe(i)d? about menopause, aimed at "breaking the taboo" around the issue, inspired by her own experiences.

She also reported for KRO.

=== Incidents in 2021 ===
In June 2021, Beugel was arrested on the charge of "facilitating the illegal stay of a foreigner in Greece". This was based on the fact that she had hosted an Afghan asylum seeker in her house in Hydra, whilst he was in the process of appealing the rejection of his request for asylum. Beugel had previously reported on this individual's story and said that it was "not a secret" that he had been residing with her. After being charged, she was released. She said that her arrest was in line with other complaints of harassments of journalists by Greek police.

In November 2021, at the joint press conference of Greek Prime Minister Kyriakos Mitsotakis with the Dutch PM Mark Rutte, Beugel asked Mitsotakis when he would "stop lying" about pushbacks in Greece. Mitsotakis responded angrily, as he considered the question to be insulting. He stated that Greece deserved praise for saving lives at sea and told Beugel to blame "those who have been instrumentalising migration systematically". Their exchange of words went viral in Greece and the next days, Beugel faced online harassment, received death threats and had details of her personal life reported in the media. She also reported that a man threw a stone at her that hit her in the face, and called her a "Turkish spy". After taking advice from the Dutch Embassy in Athens, she left the country. Beugel's treatment was condemned by The Coalition For Women In Journalism. Pavol Szalai, the head of the European Union and Balkans desk of Reporters Without Borders, stated that Beugel had been the target of "a well-orchestrated discreditation campaign on social networks and in pro-government media, but also a physical attack that forced her to plan leaving the country" and considered this to be a part of a trend of journalists working on migration being targeted in Greece, pointing out the recent surveillance of Stavros Malichudis.

In January 2022, Beugel attended a demonstration in Athens.
