= Jacob van der Beugel =

British-born Dutch artist

- Born: 29 September 1978 (age 47); London
- Education: University of York
- Awards: Royal British Society of Sculptors (2015)

Jacob van der Beugel (born 29 September 1978) is a UK born, Dutch artist.

Van der Beugel studied at the University of York before going on to create work using multiple types of clay and concrete. His work is on permanent display at Chatsworth House, Derbyshire and in the collections of Victoria and Albert Museum, London. Van der Beugel's work is collected internationally and held in numerous private collections.

== Early life and education ==
Van der Beugel was born in London in 1978. Between 1997 and 2001 he studied History of Art at the University of York where he studied under Michael White. Between 2001 and 2002 he was an apprentice to Rupert Spira, and then from 2003 to 2004 he was assistant to Edmund de Waal. Since 2004 he has been based in Devon, where he has his studio.

== Art market ==
Van der Beugel shows work through the New Art Centre, Roche Court, East Winterslow, Wiltshire.

== Work ==
His piece From Here to There was acquired by the Victoria & Albert Museum in 2008.

At Chatsworth House in Derbyshire, the Duke and Duchess of Devonshire commissioned The North Sketch Sequence in 2014. This large scale installation represents the mitochondrial DNA of the Duke and Duchess of Devonshire and their son and daughter-in-law, Lord and Lady Burlington in a series of 650 ceramic panels and protruding ceramic blocks organised into 4 columns. The author, Alain de Botton described The North Sketch Sequence as "a beautiful poetic work which is exemplary in the way it manages to turn information (of which we have so much, and which usually leaves us so cold) into art (which touches our hearts)". Van der Beugel's work has recently featured in a film series by Sotheby's and Huntsman titled "Treasures of Chatsworth". More recently van der Beugel worked in collaboration with ECSG, the Epidemiology Cancer Statistics Group based at York University, the resulting work Pathways of Patients I &II are " two 275-pound architectural concrete panels delicately scored by snakelike patterns " in liquid rust.

From 2018 to 2019 van der Beugel was The Wallace Collection Artist in Residence where he worked closely with museum's curators and studied the Collection's objects and archives with an aim to explore the theme of legacy, and humanity's attempts to endure.

In the summer of 2019, The King and Queen of the Netherlands announced the completion of major renovations to their home, Huis ten Bosch Palace. This included the installation of an immersive ceramic room by Jacob van der Beugel. Taking three years to make and crafted from nearly 60,000 handmade blocks, the artwork depicts the DNA of the King and Queen of The Netherlands and its future Queen, a symbolic global citizen, or as van der Beugel describes, "a portrait of all of us" - a human portrait of the past and of the future. Van der Beugel believes the idea of portraiture is fundamental to such a house as Huis ten Bosch Palace. "Grand houses like this should absorb people's stories...It's what people do: they leave their own mark, which breathes new life into the house."

A Mutating Story, van der Beugel's solo exhibition at the Museum Beelden aan Zee, Scheveningen, will run from 20 March 2020 through to 28 June 2020. "In his monumental sculptures, the Dutch artist Jacob van der Beugel presents human cells as a ‘biological landscape’. These evocative works show the vulnerability of human cells, but also their ability to mutate, change and adapt. He brings together a sense of the inevitable and a sense of hope through compelling, beautiful works that merge art with science"

== Selected awards ==
- 2015 Member of Royal British Society of Sculptors
- 2014 Winner of CODAworx Award, USA
- 2007 Arts Council, Development Award
- 2006 Arts Council, Research and Professional Development award
- 2005 Crafts Council Development Award

== Publications ==
The North Sketch Sequence, published by Joanna Bird, 2014.

The Groene Salon, Huis ten Bosch, Netherlands, 2019.
