= Iasonas Apostolopoulos =

Greek human rights activist

Iasonas Apostolopoulos is a Greek human rights activist and rescuer of immigrants traveling at sea from Africa or Asia towards Europe. He has been active since 2015.

== Early life and education ==
Apostolopoulos is a civil engineer. He studied at the Technical University of Athens, the same university where he obtained his master's degree at environmental engineering.

== Activism ==
Apostolopoulos has worked in South Sudan with MSF Médicins Sans Frontières.

In 2019, as part of the flee of NGO "Mediterranea Saving Humans"'s boat he defied the ban imposed from the Italian government and entered the port of Lampedusa, rescuing 46 refugees.

In 2021, it was announced by the office of the President of Greece that he was to be awarded for his humanitarian efforts, only to be withdrawn hours later. Konstantinos Bogdanos, a conservative MP, then with New Democracy ruling party, boasted that he was behind the withdrawal of his award.

In 2022, after a speech at a European Parliament's event, where he blamed the Greek Coastguard for being responsible of the drowning of immigrants trying to pass the Aegean sea, he was the target of online harassment by Greek right-wing media.

He is critical of Greece's treatment of refugees. He claimed that Greece commits crimes against humanity and pushback of refugees in the Aegean Sea, which is illegal.

He authored the chapter "Just in front of Sicily: migration crisis in the Mediterranean Sea" in Newcomers as Agents for Social Change: Learning from the Italian Experience (2021) published by FrancoAngeli.
