= Steve Apostolopoulos =

Canadian billionaire businessman

- Born: Toronto, Canada
- Occupation: Businessman
- Title: Managing partner, Triple Group of Companies
- Father: Andreas Apostolopoulos

Steve Apostolopoulos is a Canadian businessman. He was born in Toronto as the son of the late Greek-Canadian businessman Andreas Apostolopoulos. He is the managing partner of the real estate firm Triple Group of Companies, the founder of the private equity firm Six Ventures, and the co-founder of credit card firm Caary.

In 2023, Apostolopoulos pursued bids to purchase the National Football League (NFL)'s Washington Commanders and the National Hockey League (NHL)'s Ottawa Senators before they were sold to other parties.
