= Global Human Rights Defence =

- Abbreviation: GHRD
- Formation: 2003
- Type: NGO
- Location: The Hague, South Holland, The Netherlands
- Chairman: Sradhanand Sital
- Website: www.ghrd.org

Global Human Rights Defence (GHRD) is an international Non-Governmental Organization (NGO) based in The Hague, Netherlands. GHRD focuses specifically on promoting and protecting human rights worldwide. GHRD places emphasis on those areas and populations of the world where severe and extensive human rights violations of ethnic, linguistic and religious minorities have continued unabated over long periods of time, and where structural help and global attention of Governments and international institutions have failed to reach.

GHRD conducts its work via three pillars:

- Human rights reporting: done by local observers
- Humanitarian aid: aimed at victims of human rights violations
- Human rights education: in South Asia, Netherlands and Europe

== Minorities ==
GHRD concentrates on the human rights of minority groups:

1. that are dominated by social, economical and political power;
2. that have been deprived of effective protection against gross and systematic violations;
3. that have been deprived of access to resources simply because of their identity and beliefs.

GHRD's work is based on the UN Declaration on Rights of Minorities (1992), and therefore it works with linguistic, religious and ethnic minorities.

"Basic aims of the United Nations, as proclaimed in the Charter, is to promote and encourage respect for human rights and for fundamental freedoms for all, without distinction as to race, sex, language or religion,[...] emphasizing that the constant promotion and realization of the rights of persons belonging to national or ethnic, religious and linguistic minorities, as an integral part of the development of society as a whole and within a democratic framework based on the rule of law, would contribute to the strengthening of friendship and cooperation among peoples and States" General Assembly Resolution 47/135, 18 December 1992.

== Identity ==
GHRD is integrally distinctive from other organisations in various ways. For one, it focuses on those issues and areas where people have been deprived of their rights without their cases being properly addressed by both governments and authorities. GHRD is the first organisation in The Hague (The Netherlands) to address specifically the human rights of minorities. Outside The Hague, GHRD is distinctive because of its permanent presence of local observers, who produce genuine information and reports of distinctive quality, due to their profound knowledge of the local humanitarian situation.

=== Objective ===
GHRD has formulated the following objectives in order to fulfil its mission:

1. To fight against the violation of human rights of minority groups, particularly in those areas and populations where structural help or global attention of the world has not been given;
2. To provide refugee centre assistance and humanitarian aid to those who lack elementary basic needs such as food, clothing, shelter and proper sanitary conditions;
3. To develop, stimulate and enhance human rights awareness in a national and international perspective, through means of education.

== History ==
GHRD was officially founded after The Hague 2003 International Conference on Human Rights, which was sub-themed Human Rights of Refugees and Victims of Ethnic and Religious Violence. At the end of the conference a gap in the human rights work was spotted: human rights of minorities. The establishment of GHRD was supported by a broad spectrum of over a 150 selected participants of national and international human rights organisations from all over the world. The memorandum of association, which was agreed upon unanimously and signed by all participating parties, provides the structure of this international organisation.

At the time of its establishment, the Board was led by Sradhanand Sital who still is the chairman of the organisation. When it was first established, GHRD had no official office and worked solely on a voluntary basis. Meetings were held at the founders’ living-rooms and activities were conducted by a small group of dedicated people. In September 2005, the organisation opened its head-office in The Hague at Javastraat and employed the first paid staff. In the building, GHRD was neighbour of United Network of Young Peacebuilders (UNOY) and United Nations High Commissioner for Refugees (UNHCR). Also in 2005, GHRD promoted a four-day congress at the City Hall of the Hague. The congress was titled GHRD reaches for the future and brought together some 120 experts in the field of human rights. Amongst the speakers were Dutch Human Rights Ambassador Mr. P. de Klerk, and the Mayor of The Hague Mr. W. Deetman.

In 2006 the founders had already some contacts in South-Asia and it was easier to start acting in the region. Moreover, the South-Asia region fulfilled the mission/vision of GHRD, as the violations of human rights of minorities did not hit the headlines nor were they on top of the political agenda.

== Headquarters ==
GHRD head-office is based in Alexanderveld in the peace capital The Hague, South Holland, where all operations from the region are coordinated. At the time of its establishment, GHRD initially opened its offices in India, and Bangladesh. Nepal and Sri Lanka followed in 2004. Except Sri Lanka, all the offices are still active. The Sri Lanka's office had to be closed after the Tsunami in December 2004. After the disaster, a great number of NGOs started working in the country and employing local human rights experts. As a small organisation, GHRD was not able to top the salaries being paid to the locals and had to abandon the country.

In 2006, GHRD opened officially the Bhutan Chapter. GHRD had been working with the Bhutanese refugees in Nepal from the start. The observer based in Kathmandu worked closely with the seven refugee camps sponsored by the United Nations High Commission for Refugees (UNHCR). In the same year, in India the Women's Wing was launched. However, due to a lack of human resources, the division was never fully activated. GHRD has also contacts spread around Malaysia and Indonesia and is currently studying the possibility of opening an office in Pakistan. In July 2007, GHRD signed a letter of intent for exchange of information with the African foundation Bajito Onda Africa.

== European Seminars ==
In 2006, GHRD decided to become more active in Europe and initiated a cycle of seminars on migrants in Europe and human rights. The European Seminars programme has as a basic principle the promotion of equality, unity and understanding among diverse cultures, ethnicities and religions of the world, and it seeks to create opportunities regarding peace and prosperity for mankind. Consequently, the topics tackle contemporary challenges, which cause racial enmity, social unrest and overt conflicts in all levels of society.

Seminars:

In 2006

- The Hague: Human Rights Education and Social Engagement.
- Berlin: Human Rights Education and Social Engagement—under the All Equal—All Different Campaign of the Council of Europe.

In 2007

- Turin: Intercultural Forum on Rights of Migration and Asylum (IN.F.O.R.M.A.)—under the All Different—All Equal Campaign of the Council of Europe.

In 2008

- Spain
- United Kingdom

== Advocacy ==
=== Reply to Dutch Human Rights Report (2017) ===
In 2017, the GHRD wrote to the Dutch Ministry of Foreign affairs to criticize its recent Human Rights report. They wrote as a representative of Global Hindu Foundation (GHF) to express their objections to the report. They noted:

"We recognize that Christians are persecuted in Pakistan, as mentioned in the report, however, undue emphasis on one religion while ignoring the suffering faced by the other religious minorities could have catastrophic consequences. Religious minorities in Pakistan comprise of the Hindu, Sikh, Ahmadi communities, it is unfortunate that the Human Rights report of the Dutch Ministry of Foreign Affairs altogether disregards these minorities. The ongoing human rights violations need to cease immediately in order to ensure that religious minorities are not completely wiped out from Pakistan.

The report sadly shows the duplicity of the Dutch government in predominantly funding and supporting those organizations which work for the Christian community. The other religious minorities in Pakistan are also in dire need of international attention.

The report is built on the underlying theme that the Christian minority is the only community which faces human rights violations all over the globe. Accordingly, the Human Rights report exclusively focuses on the issues faced by members of the Christian community."

=== Asia Bibi Case (2018) ===
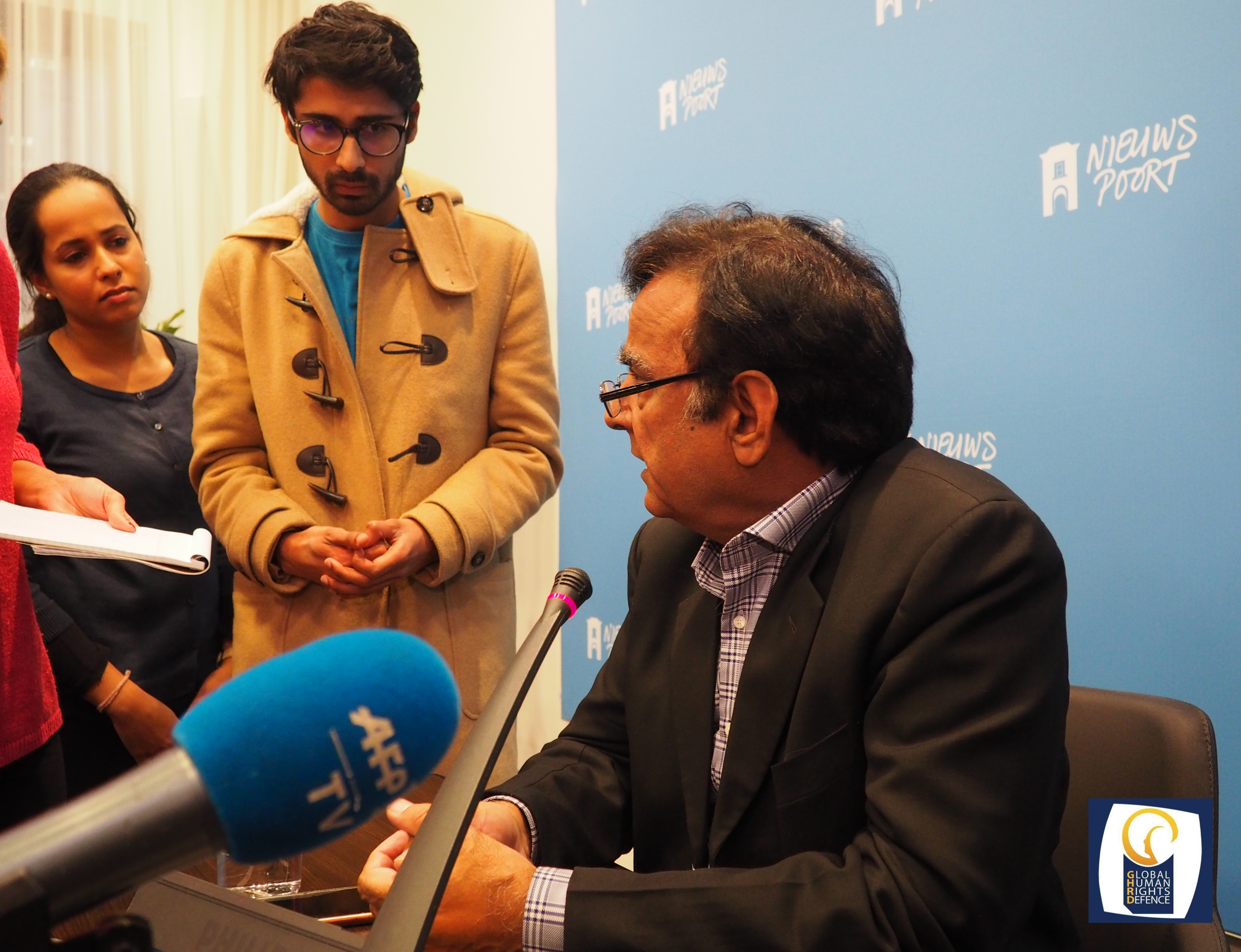
GHRD staff at Mr. Malook's press briefing

On 5 November 2018, Global Human Rights Defence's (GHRD) attended the press briefing held by Mr. Saif-ul-Malook. Mr. Malook represented Asia Bibi before the Pakistan Supreme Court and has currently sought refuge in The Netherlands.

The Pakistan Supreme Court acquitted Asia Bibi of blasphemy charges citing lack of evidence on 31 October 2018. Since the judgement, Pakistan has been rocked by protests from fundamentalist groups who have made open calls for violence against the religious minorities in Pakistan. The protestors demanded that the Pakistan government must include Asia Bibi's name on the Exit Control List, in the hope that it would prevent her from flying out of the country.

Mr. Vivek, GHRD's Human Rights Officer asked him about Asia Bibi's name being put on Pakistan's Exit Control List, he replied that under the legislation, a person's name can be put onto the Exit control list only if there is a criminal case or a case of criminal fraud pending against the person. Asia Bibi does not have any pending cases against her, so her name cannot be placed on the Exit Control List. Moreover, in so far as the agreement between the government and the protesters was concerned, the agreement has no constitutional or legal validity

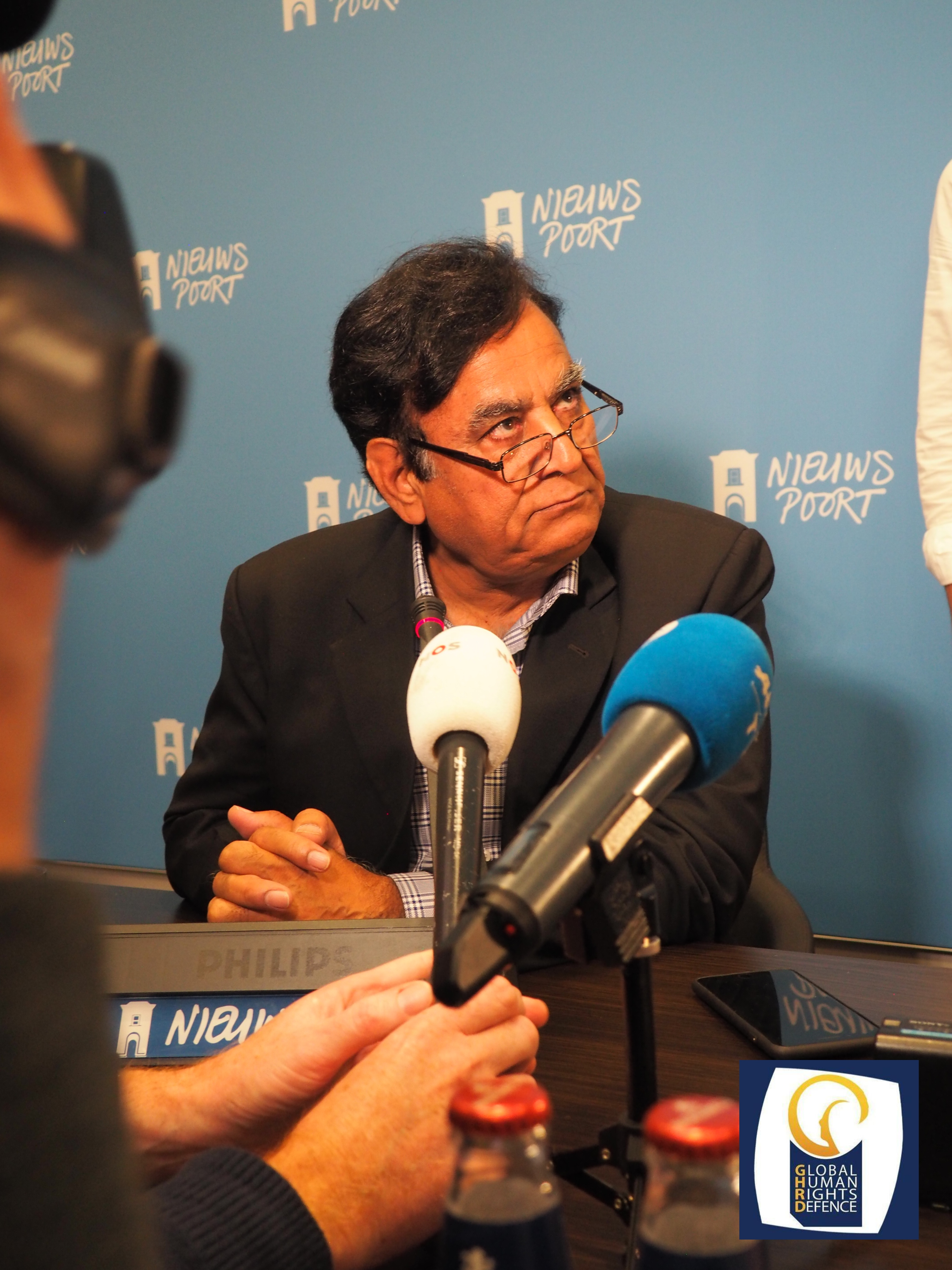
Mr. Malook at Asia Bibi's press conference

=== Kashmiri Pandits (2018) ===
On 1 October 2018, the GHRD sent a letter to Mr. Antonio Guterres, United Nations Secretary General, to raise the issue of the Kashmiri Pandits. They warned:

"Kashmiri Pandits, a religious minority group in the state of Jammu and Kashmir, have been systematically persecuted by the majority community since 1989. Kashmiri Pandits were forced to flee their homes and move to other parts of the country in order to save their lives, those who remained were mercilessly killed or subjected to other inhumane acts. Moreover, their religious places have been desecrated and vandalized. A brutal campaign of terror, murder, rape and arson and has been unleashed by the majority community which will stop at nothing to make sure that Kashmiri Pandits are completely wiped out from the region. There is an intentional attempt to bring about the physical destruction of the entire group."

The GHRD called for a need for the United Nations to address the situation of Kashmiri Pandits, before they are completely wiped out from the region.

They asked for the United Nations to meet with the Global Kashmiri Pandit Diaspora (GKPD), a collective organization with members in India, USA, Australia, Canada, Singapore and Europe. It consists of volunteers who have pledged to work towards the betterment of the Kashmiri Pandit community at all levels be it political or socio-economic and cultural.

== Cases ==
=== GHRD verdict on the Pabna rape case (2015) ===
On 13 March 2015, a 20-year-old woman belonging to the minority Hindu community was gang-raped in Pabna, Bangladesh. The victim was abducted and taken to a nearby jungle, where she was threatened with a knife and raped by the perpetrators. The perpetrators had warned her that they would kill her and her parents in case she approached the police.

The incident generated widespread attention and the case was investigated by GHRD and its local partner Research and Empowerment Organization (REO). The organizations constantly monitored the developments in the case and also provided aid to the victim and her family.

GHRD and REO identified that the authorities are not investigating the case and held protests to raise awareness about the problem. A protest was held wherein a human chain was created along with student volunteers. This pressurized the authorities to initiate action. GHRD and REO also began lobbying and advocacy efforts in Bangladesh to seek responsibility from the authorities.

After a series of protests, the police authorities finally registered the First Investigation Report (FIR) and arrested the perpetrators, Mohammed Farid Hossain (27 years) and Mohammed Hafizul (24 years). On 28 October 2018, the trial court sentenced the accused to life imprisonment. The verdict was delivered by Justice Owarul Islam.

GHRD has been also been involved in rehabilitation activities on the ground so that the victims can continue living a dignified life in society. The victim in the Pabna case has been successfully rehabilitated and is currently working with GHRD's local partner in Bangladesh, REO.

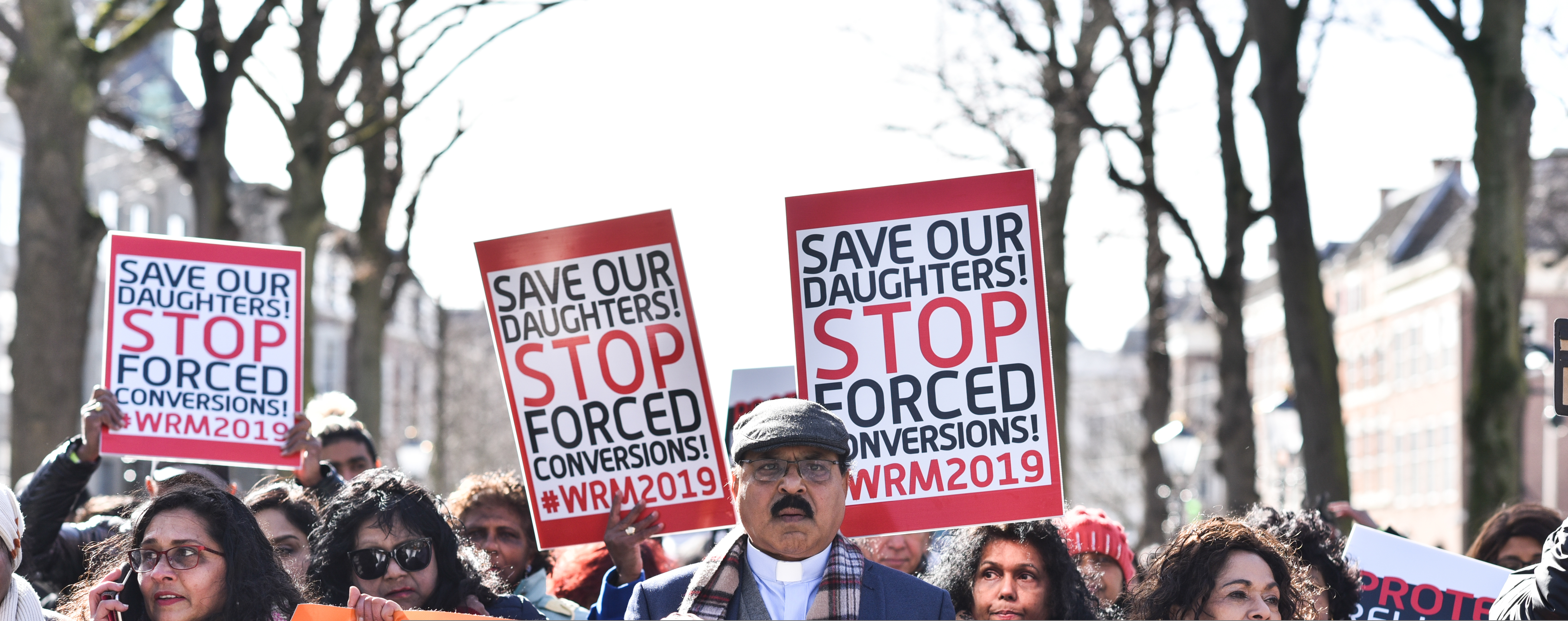
Women's Rights March in the Hague

=== Women's Rights March (2019) ===
Global Human Rights Defence (GHRD) organized an event on 7 March 2019 to highlight the persecution of religious minorities in Pakistan.

The march sought to focus international attention on the plight of minorities in Pakistan. The percentage of religious minorities in Pakistan has reduced from 23% to a mere 3.7% of the total population. Minorities are increasingly vulnerable to intimidation and attacks in Pakistan and often little is done to protect minority communities in the country.

=== Human Rights for Nirmala (2018) ===
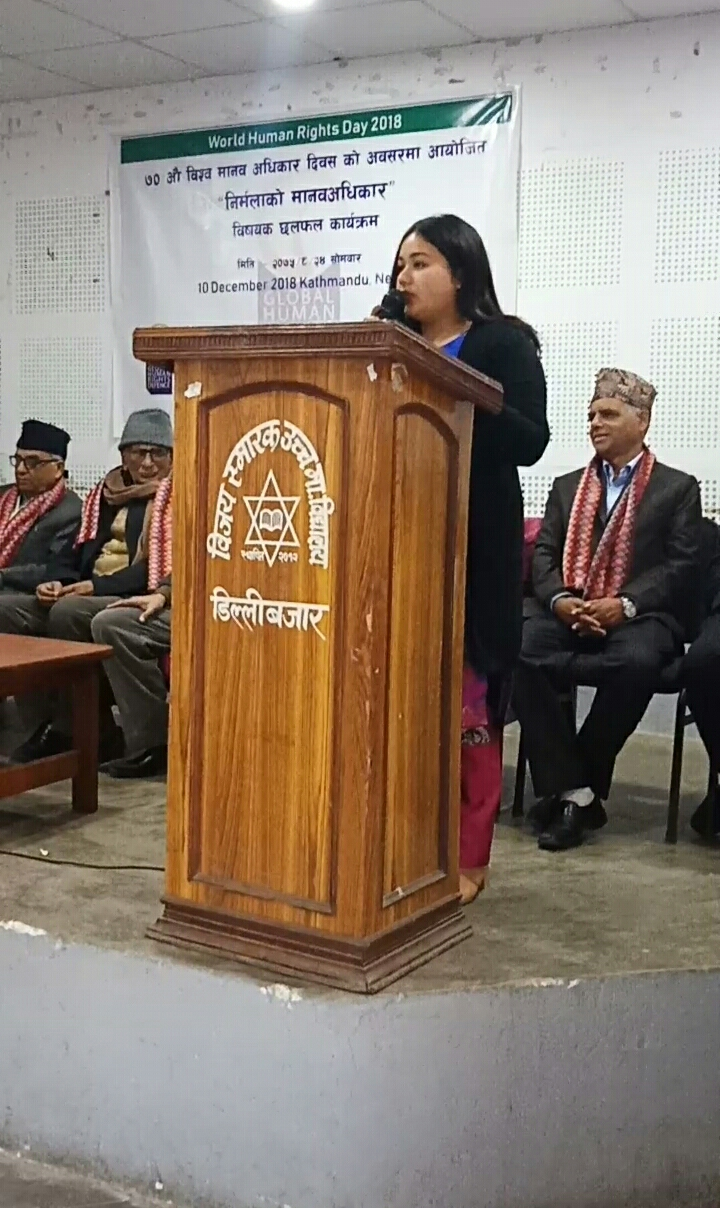
Sukomal Bhattarai at the Nirmala event in Nepal

The GHRD helped organize a programme in Nepal for the advocacy of rights for women. Ms. Sukomal Bhattarai delivered a speech on the case of Nirmala, a 13-year-old girl who was raped and murdered. She used this case to spread a message that highlighted the prevalence of gender and religion based violence. In total 8 speeches were delivered and a panel of notables and 80 guests were present at the event.

=== Protest: Religious Minorities in Pakistan (2018) ===
GHRD organized a protest on 22 September 2018 before the United Nations in Geneva to focus international attention on the persecution of religious minorities in Pakistan.

A group of over 100 protesters participated in a march through the center of Geneva city. The protesters assembled in the city center, wearing black shirts which proclaimed “Protect Pakistani Christians”. The march began in the city center, moved past the train station and through the central business district of Geneva. The protesters then briefly halted by Lake Geneva.

The protesters helped raise awareness about the plight of Christians in Pakistan. Curious onlookers and citizens were informed about the serious violations against religious minorities in Pakistan. Specific references were made to the unjust Blasphemy laws and the Asia Bibi case. Individuals were educated about the gross violations of freedom of religion and belief, and the need for the international community to take action.

The gathering was joined by the dignitaries, Dr. Mario Silva, executive chairman of IFRAS, Mr. Henri Malosse, former president of the European Economic and Social Committee, Mr. Tomas Zdechovsky, Member of European parliament, Mr. Benjamin Blanchar, Director of SOS Chrétiens d’Orient and Mr. Gyorgy Holvenyi, Member of European Parliament.

=== Press Release: International Day for the Elimination of Violence against Women (2018) ===
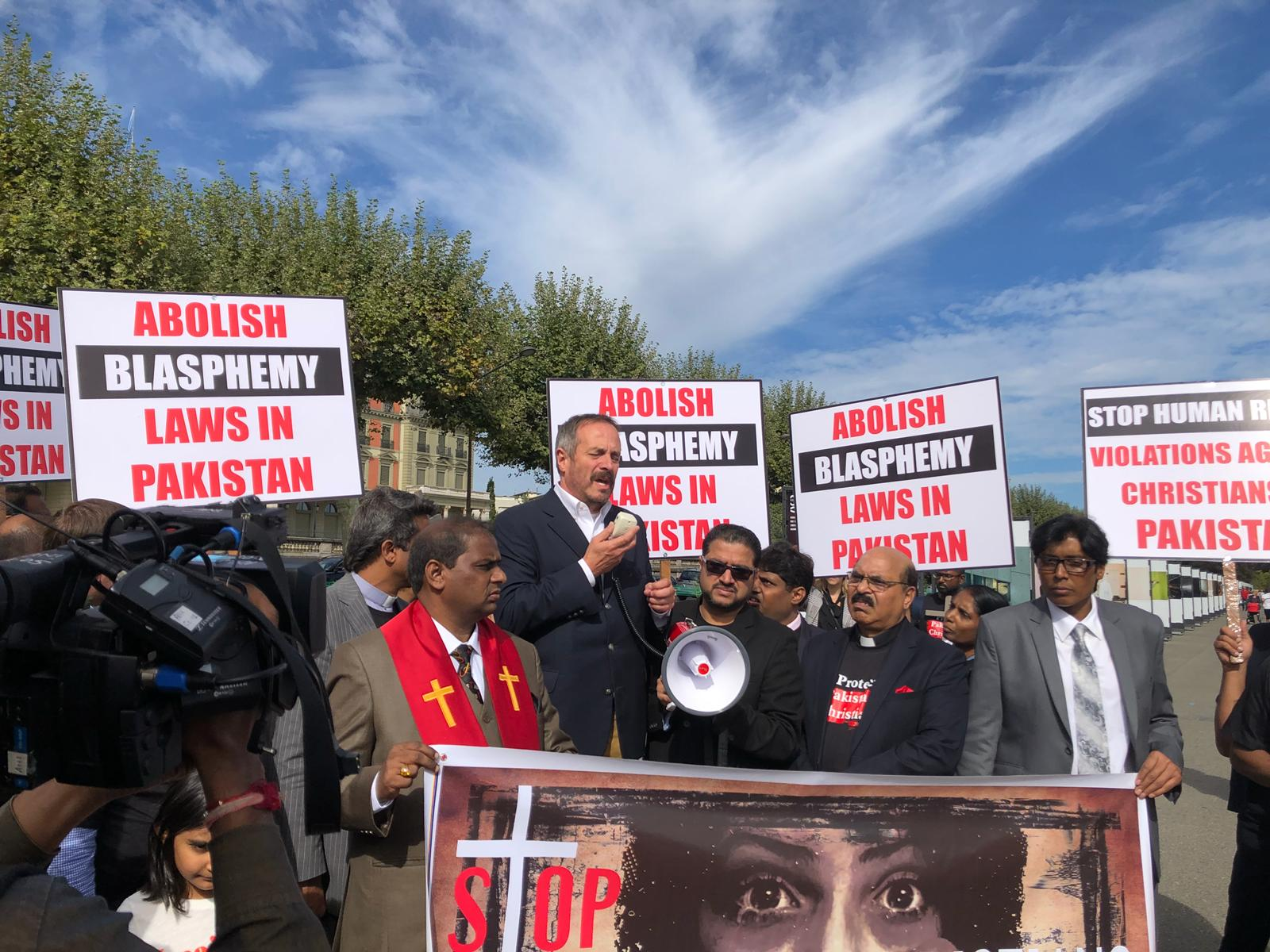
GHRD protest in Geneva

On 24 November 2018, Human Rights Focus Pakistan (HRFP) in collaboration with Global Human Rights Defense (GHRD) organized an event on International Women's Day 2018 for the Elimination of Violence Against Women. The representatives of civil society organizations, women activists, political workers, social activists, HRD's, lawyers, teachers, youth and students participated to end violations against women.

The screening of the Video Documentary, “The Trapping Faiths” was also arranged during event and the all participants endorsed the recommendations jointly including to end-up the abductions, forced conversions and forced marriages of minority girls which was raised in video documentary through 4 case studies of Hindu and Christian girls, as the numbering are growing day by day. The speakers urged that state must ensure victims and their families are kept safe and all violence against women is eliminated.

== Campaigns and Involvement ==
=== Stop the Gang Rapes Campaign (2007) ===
In 2007 GHRD started its first campaign. The initiative focused on the gang rapes that victimised Bangladeshi women and young girls. The main objective of the campaign was to raise awareness to the issue. The campaign was based in the Netherlands and it spread naturally via the internet to other European countries and even reached the United States. The campaigners used social utilities such as MySpace and Facebook to promote the message.

The campaign was also promoted via its ambassadors: Scottish band Brand New Deja Vu, DJ Paul Jay and Bangladeshi writer Taslima Nasrin. GHRD made available petitions in several languages asking the Bangladeshi government to take necessary actions. The campaign was launched on 16 June 2007 with a Beach Benefit Concert at Scheveningen (Netherlands). Performances were made by Brand New Deja Vu, DJ Paul Jay, Valerius and Little Things That Kill.

=== Fight Modern Slavery (2011) ===
In 2011, GHRD campaigned against modern slavery—existing today in forms from trafficking for the sex trade, to bonded labour, child labour, caste discrimination, and sexual exploitation. A series of activism events included: rallies, door to door campaigns, information sessions, street dramas, and screenings of the GHRD documentary. The documentary focuses specially on trafficking of girls from Nepal.
