= Pushback (migration) =

Forced return of refugees and immigrants

In migration, pushback is "a set of state measures by which refugees and migrants are forced back over a border – generally immediately after they crossed it – without consideration of their individual circumstances and without any possibility to apply for asylum". Pushbacks violate the prohibition of collective expulsion of asylum seekers in Protocol 4 in countries party to the European Convention on Human Rights and often violate the international law prohibition on refoulement.

Pushback is contrasted with "pullback", a form of extraterritorial migration control the country seeking to repel asylum seekers arranges with a third country to prevent them from leaving.

== Definition ==
Neža Kogovšek Šalamon considers that there is no single, recognized definition of a pushback, but in general they can be characterized as "informal collective forced returns of people who irregularly enter the country back to the country they entered from, via procedures that take place outside legally defined rules in protocols or agreements signed by the neighbouring countries". Pushbacks target migrants indiscriminately, regardless of whether they have grounds for international protection, and without the opportunity to apply for asylum. In many cases the forced return is enforced with police violence and is often accompanied by threats, humiliation, and theft of migrants' belongings and mobile phones. Pushbacks are typically done in a clandestine fashion, frequently without informing the authorities of the country that is receiving the pushed-back migrants. Therefore, there is usually no documentation that a pushback took place and it is difficult for victims to seek redress.

According to Niamh Keady-Tabbal and Itamar Mann, writing for the European Journal of International Law, the word "pushback" is related to "an erosion of refugee law, and a parallel license to inflict ever more extreme violence upon people on the move who are not bone fide refugees". In the case of pushbacks in the Aegean, they doubt that pushback is an appropriate word for "a human rights violation that encapsulates a will to eliminate a person’s presence on the face of the planet".

== Legality ==
If the refugees are at risk of life or freedom due to "race, religion, nationality, membership of a particular social group or political opinion", with the exception of "danger to the security of the country", the pushbacks violate the principle of non-refoulement in international law, including the Convention Relating to the Status of Refugees.

In some regions additional laws apply, in Europe pushbacks often violate the prohibition of collective expulsion of asylum seekers in Protocol 4 of the European Convention on Human Rights. Refoulement, as well as summary expulsions, are also prohibited by Articles 18 and 19 of the EU Charter of Fundamental Rights., Article 13 of the International Covenant on Civil and Political Rights, Article 22§9 of the American Convention on Human Rights, and Article 12§5 African Charter on Human and Peoples' Rights. Depending on the circumstances, pushbacks may themselves constitute torture, or ill-treatment, or violate the right to life, prohibited by international law including the ECHR and the EU Charter of Fundamental Rights. Marco Stefan and Roberto Cortinovi, at the European University Institute, describe pushbacks as "a major threat to the fundamental rights and rule of law standards established under EU primary and secondary legislation". There have also been attempts to challenge pushbacks on the basis that they could amount to forced disappearances or crimes against humanity in especially severe cases.

UNHCR has urged European countries to put an end to pushbacks at Europe's land and sea borders, calling them "simply illegal". Both the Court of Justice of the European Union and the European Court of Human Rights have ruled that Hungary's policy of systematically deporting migrants to the Serbian border was unlawful. 72,000 people have been affected by this policy since 2016, which Hungary continues despite these rulings. However, Frontex suspended its operations in Hungary.

Pushbacks by the Hungarian authorities often involve police brutality - beating up asylum seekers and setting the dogs upon them - that in several cases end with death. The Hungarian authorities usually fail to investigate these tragedies effectively, and the cases are taken to the European Court of Human Rights. In Hungary, the Hungarian Helsinki Committee examines and reports about these abuses, provides free legal assistance to the plaintiffs, and takes them to court.

Members of the parliament in Finland voted 167 to 31 in July 2024 for a law allowing pushbacks. Under the law, no asylum claims will be accepted on Finlands eastern border, if Russia transports migrants there in a hybrid warfare destabilization attempt, like it did in late 2023. When ordered, the measure allows the use of force to return migrants to Russian territory. The order has to be issued by the president in conjunction with the parliament and the measure is limited to one month per directive.

== Cases ==
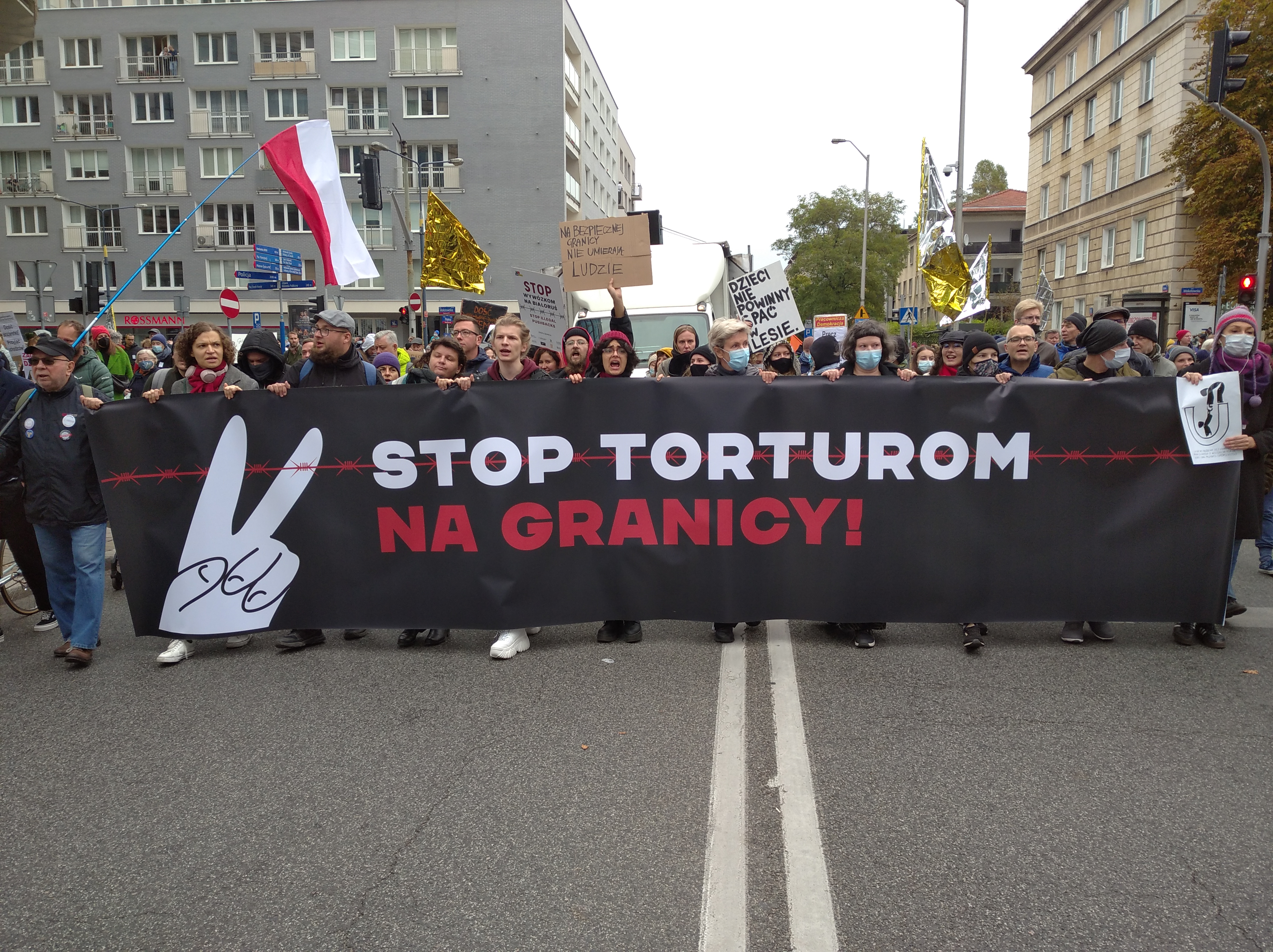
People in Warsaw take part in a protest rally in solidarity with migrants who have been pushed back at Poland's border with Belarus in October 2021.

On 5 May 2021, analysis by The Guardian estimated that EU countries had carried out almost 40,000 pushbacks, linked to 2,000 deaths, since the beginning of the COVID-19 pandemic. The Border Violence Monitoring Network, a coalition of organizations dedicated to monitoring and documenting pushbacks and other attributed human rights violence has documented 1281 testimonies, affecting over 22,646 persons.

=== Balkan route ===
Amnesty International has documented pushbacks by Greece since 2013. In 2021, Council of Europe Commissioner for Human Rights Dunja Mijatović urged Greece to put an end to pushbacks of migrants. Many of the pushbacks in Greece and Croatia are accomplished by masked men who have been observed operating Hellenic Coast Guard vessels or in heavily surveilled areas of the Croatian–Bosnian border. According to the Border Violence Monitoring Network (BVMN), almost 90% of migrants traveling on the Balkan route who reported pushbacks in 2020 also reported "torture, inhuman or degrading treatment". BVMN has reported "assaults lasting up to six hours, attacks by unmuzzled police dogs, and food being rubbed into the open wounds of pushback victims". In 2021 through 30 June, the Protecting Rights at Borders coalition recorded 5565 people reporting pushbacks.

=== European Union–Belarus border ===
After the Belarusian government aided migrants to cross the Belarus–Poland border as a part of what European Commission president Ursula von der Leyen described as a hybrid attack, Poland legalized pushback of migrants by force in October 2021, which is illegal under EU and international law. Human rights group Amnesty International and other human rights organisations replied by stating that Poland and Lithuania had breached migrants' rights, as they limit the access of asylum seekers to their territory. Lithuania and several other countries have proposed legalizing pushbacks to the European Commission as a result of the border crisis.

=== Others ===
Pushbacks have been reported on Europe's borders in the Western, Central and Eastern Mediterranean. There are reports that Turkey has engaged in pushbacks on its borders with Syria and Iran. Tunisia also engages in pushbacks of migrants (mostly Libyans). Australia also engaged in pushback. On 15 January 2014, an orange fibreglass "survival capsule", containing about 60 asylum seekers, came ashore at Cikepuh in West Java. A second containing 34 people arrived at Pangandaran on 5 February. The Daily Telegraph reported that the Australian government was believed to have purchased eleven of the capsules from Singapore at a cost of around $500,000. In May 2014, Australia was alleged to have placed two persons who had arrived earlier in the year onto a boat with other asylum seekers which was turned back to Indonesia. In January 2015, Minister Dutton announced that 15 vessels, containing 429 asylum seekers in total, had been subject to turnback operations of some kind towards Indonesia or Sri Lanka since the beginning of Operation Sovereign Borders.

== See also ==
- Opposition to immigration
- Stop the boats
- Weaponized migration
