= Leuninger =

Leuninger is a German surname.

People with this surname include:

- Franz Leuninger (1898–1945), German trade unionist, politician and resistant against the Nazis' rise to power and regime
- Herbert Leuninger (1932–2020), German Catholic priest and theologian
