= Herbert Leuninger =

German Catholic priest (1932–2020)

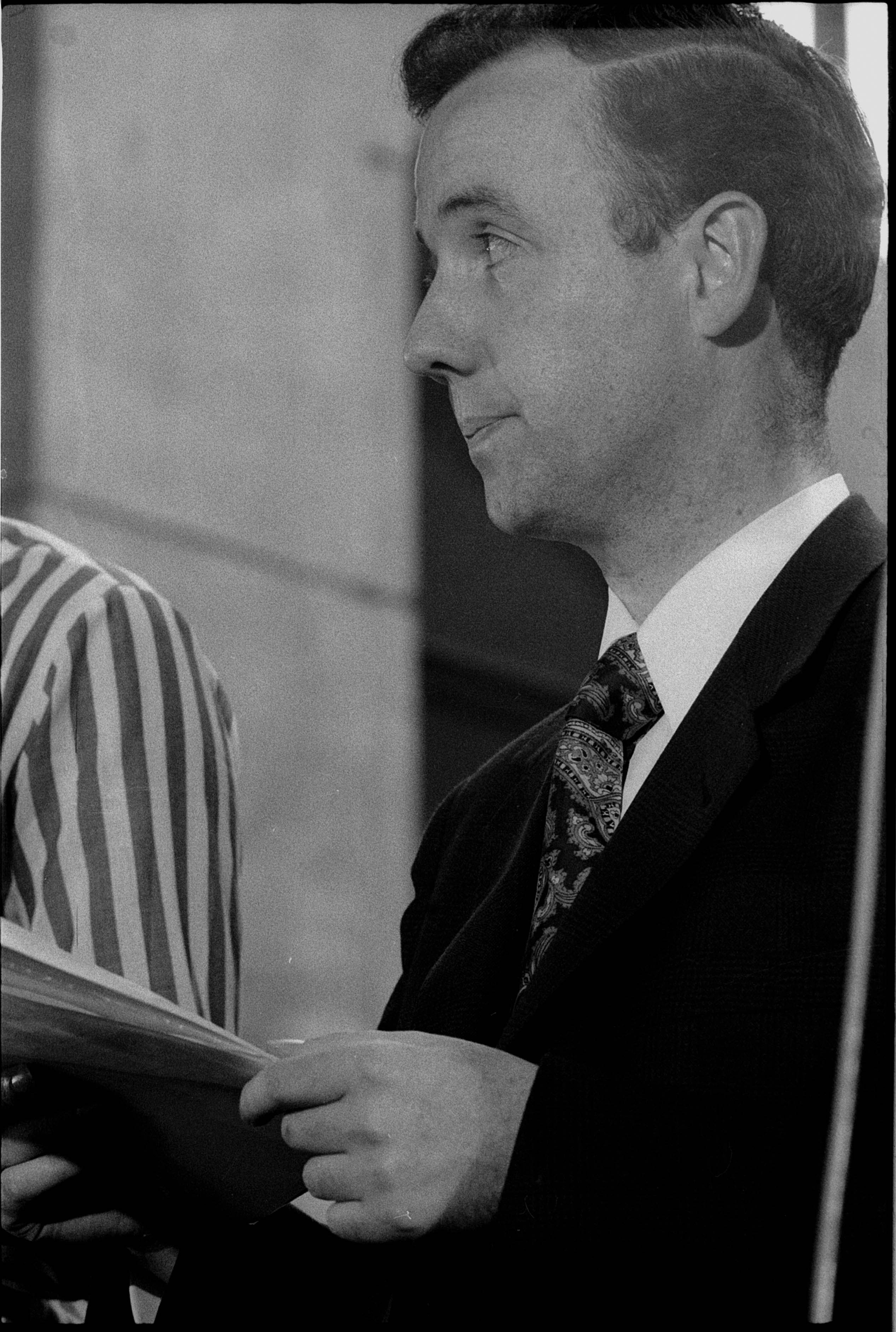
- Herbert Leuninger
- Born: 8 September 1932; Cologne-Ossendorf, Germany
- Died: 28 July 2020 (aged 87); Limburg an der Lahn, Hesse, Germany
- Occupations: Theologian; Catholic priest; Human rights activist
- Organizations: Diocese of Limburg; Pro Asyl; European Council on Refugees and Exiles
- Awards: Wilhelm Leuschner Medal
- Website: www.leuninger-herbert.de

Herbert Leuninger (8 September 1932 – 28 July 2020) was a German Catholic priest and theologian. He was a human rights activist for asylum in Germany, a co-founder and speaker of the organisation Pro Asyl, helping refugees, and a member of the board of the European Council on Refugees and Exiles. He is remembered as a "loudspeaker" of refugees.

== Life ==
Leuninger was born in Cologne-Ossendorf, the second of three children of Alois and Elisabeth Leuninger from Mengerskirchen, Westerwald, where he grew up; his brother Ernst Leuninger also became a priest and theologian. His uncle Franz Leuninger was a Christian trade unionist active in the German resistance to Nazism, who was executed on 1 March 1945 at the Plötzensee Prison.

After his Abitur at the Gymnasium Philippinum Weilburg, Leuninger studied philosophy and theology. He was ordained as a priest in Limburg Cathedral on 8 December 1958. He assisted in a parish in Frankfurt-Nied, and then was chaplain (Kaplan), from 1959 in Oberlahnstein and later at the Antoniuskirche in Frankfurt's Westend, then as parish priest in Kriftel. In 1970, he was appointed youth pastor (Jugendpfarrer) for the Main-Taunus district. He served as the advisor for migration questions (Migrationsreferent) to the Bishop of Limburg from 1972 to 1992, under bishops Wilhelm Kempf and Franz Kamphaus. Leuninger served as a member of the board of the European Council on Refugees and Exiles based in London.

In 1986, he founded with Jürgen Micksch and others in Frankfurt Pro Asyl, a human rights organisation for refugees seeking asylum in Germany. He served as the organisation's spokesman until 1994, then as its referent for Europe until 1998.

Besides dealing with questions of the Church and theology, Leuninger was involved with topics related to asylum in Germany, such as Integration von Zugewanderten (integration of immigrants), Fremdenfeindlichkeit (Xenophobia, literally: hostility towards strangers], and Multikulturelle Gesellschaft (multi-cultural society) and published on these areas.

Leininger died after a short illness in Limburg at the age of 87.

== Awards ==
- 1991: Wilhelm Leuschner Medal of the state of Hesse
- 1998: Walter-und-Marianne-Dirks-Preis, with his brother Ernst Leuninger
