= Hungarian Helsinki Committee =

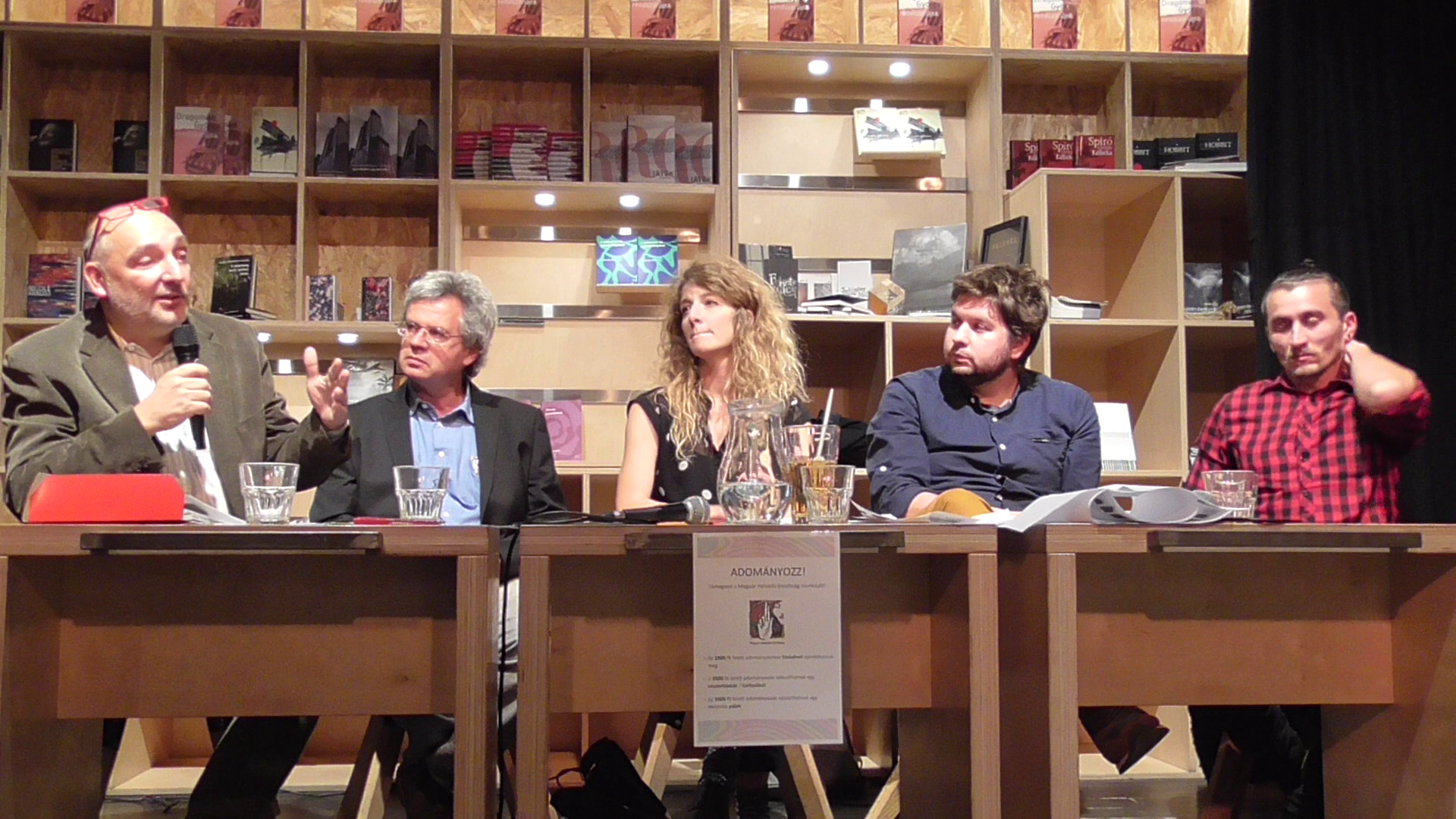
An event of the HHC

The Hungarian Helsinki Committee (HHC; Hungarian: Magyar Helsinki Bizottság) is a non-governmental human rights organization founded in 1989 and based in Budapest, Hungary. The HHC is a member of the International Helsinki Federation for Human Rights and the European Council on Refugees and Exiles. The HHC defines itself as monitoring the respect for human rights protected by international human rights instruments, to inform the public about human rights violations and to provide victims of human rights abuse with free legal assistance. It is also linked with the OMCT and is a member organisation of the European Council on Refugees and Exiles (ECRE).

The Hungarian Helsinki Committee is also active in the rights of asylum seekers, condition of people detained, the stateless and people residing in foreign countries in need of legal assistance.

== Areas of work ==
The Hungarian Helsinki Committee specializes on 3 topics - managing projects, legal cases and publishing reports, analyses, and articles mostly in them:

- Rule of law – defending individuals, organisations, and society against the government's abuse of power
- Refugee and migrant rights – legal aid and representation to people who had to flee their home countries
- Justice – working for a fair criminal justice system, prisoners and their families, stepping up against police ill-treatment

== Notable cases and results ==
=== The Ukrainian refugee crisis ===
When Russia invaded Ukraine on 24 February 2022, war refugees arrived in a wholly demolished asylum system in Hungary, lacking the institutional capacity to cater for their needs. The Hungarian Helsinki Committee's monitoring team was on the Ukrainian–Hungarian border collecting first-hand information already on the second day of the war. It also created a specific email address and a landing page, and is conducting monitoring and legal assistance visits to the border area and diverse locations where Ukrainian refugees are accommodated all around the country ever since.

In March 2022, the HHC was the only refugee response actor who publicly denounced that potentially tens of thousands of Ukrainian refugees holding dual Hungarian–Ukrainian nationality had been excluded from support services due to a legislative gap. In reaction, the government immediately amended the legislation to remedy this situation.

=== Recent victories at the European Court of Human Rights ===
The Committee brought a number of transit zone and pushback cases to the European Court of Human Rights. The ECtHR confirmed in several judgments that the detention of asylum-seekers in Hungary's transit zones had been arbitrary and, thus, unlawful in 2017. In addition, the Court consequently ruled that the detention conditions in the transit zone amounted to inhuman treatment in the case of children and pregnant women.

== International awards ==
- Human Rights Prize of the Calouste Gulbenkian Foundation - also called the Calouste Gulbenkian Prize on Human Rights (2017)
- Pro Asyl Human Rights Prize (2018)
- Sakharov Prize for Freedom (2019)
- The European Economic and Social Committee's EU Civil Solidarity Prize (2021)
- shortlisted for the Parliamentary Assembly of the Council of Europe's Václav Havel Prize for Creative Dissent (2018)
- nominated for the Nobel Peace Prize (2021)
