= Winkels (Mengerskirchen) =

- Ortsteil of Mengerskirchen
- Coat of arms
- Interactive map of Winkels
- Location within Germany Location within Hesse
- Coordinates: 50°32′53″N 08°10′40″E
- Country: Germany
- State: Hesse
- Admin. region: Gießen
- District: Limburg-Weilburg
- Municipality: Mengerskirchen
- Elevation: 320 m (1,050 ft)

Population (2006-12-31)
  - Total: 967
- Time zone: UTC+01:00 (CET)
  - Summer (DST): UTC+02:00 (CEST)
- Postal codes: 35794
- Dialling codes: 06476
- Vehicle registration: LM

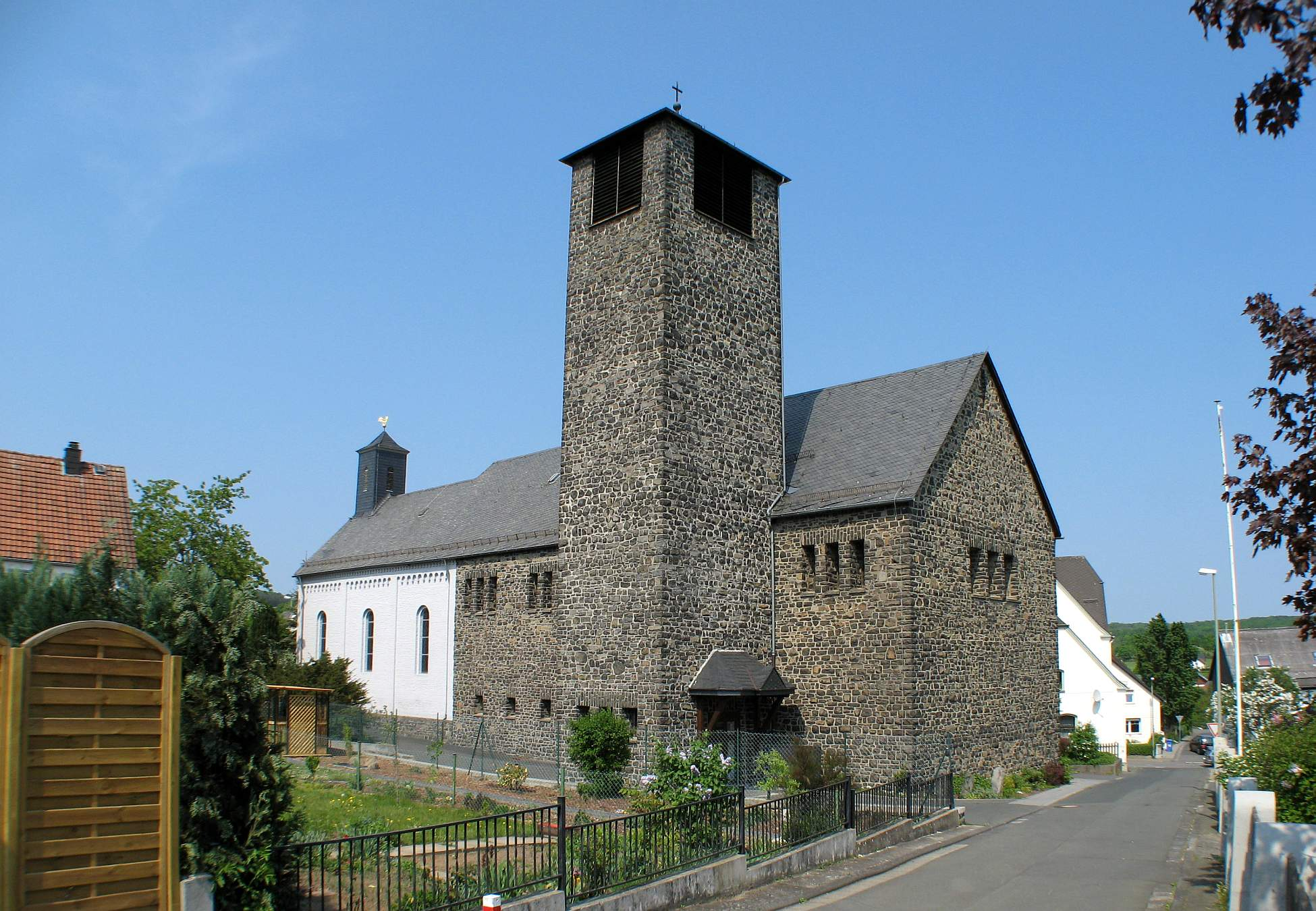
The Church in Winkels (built 1880)

Winkels is a village of the municipality of Mengerskirchen in the district of Limburg-Weilburg in Middle Hesse. It has 967 permanent and 38 temporary residents (as of 31 December 2006).

The village lies at the foot of the Westerwald not far from the Lahn in a valley. It is enclosed by wooded and bare Basalt-hills along the highway from Weilburg to Rennerod.

== History ==
Winkels was first mentioned in the year 1237 as Winkelsece in court documents. In the immediate area the castle Eigenberg (locally known as the "Maienburg") was erected. In the year 1331 it became the seat of the knights called the Lehnsmänner von Mudersbach. Under the command of the knights, locals were made to provide the castle owners with supplies and both manual and animal labour.

For many centuries the residents of Winkels had to walk long distances to the next church, in Mengerskirchen. In 1879 they began to build their own small church which was completed in 1880. Originally called the Strieder Chapel after the then mayor Strieder, it was extended in 1947 and today carries the name Mariä Geburt (Birth of Mary).

Agriculture in the stony grounds around the hills of the Westerwaldes was always difficult and the residents lived a poor and hard life. Only after the industrial revolution started and the menfolk could travel to nearby towns and cities to earn extra money, did the situation improve somewhat. Many "Winkelser" citizens were skilled builders and worked as stonemasons, bricklayers or carpenters in Westfalen, or in Siegerland or in Bergische during the spring and summer months, leaving the old, the women and children to plough and work the fields. In the long Winter months they occupied themselves with home-work and many were skilled weavers, filter-makers or potters. There were once two very large ovens to bake the pottery products of this small village.

After World War II there were significant shifts in the population, in part due to displaced persons relocating. From the mid-1950s there was a significant decrease in farming. The majority of the residents today commute to work in nearby and some more distant towns and cities such as Weilburg, Limburg, Wetzlar, Wiesbaden and Frankfurt. Also two local clay pits opened up to extract a rare quality clay from the ground. Several small workshops and factories have settled into the area providing work for local men and women.

The former independent village of Winkels, as part of the Oberlahnkreis, combined with the neighbour town of Mengerskirchen and a few other small villages during the state ordered Federal Boundaries Reform Act on 1 January 1971.

== Major Anniversary ==
Winkels celebrated its 750th year birthday on the 7th to 10 August 1987. Among some of the many important state and city representatives attending, was the Mayor of Berlin (Berlin celebrating its 700-year birthday later that same year) attended, as did a group of Dutch citizens and the mayor of the north Holland Partner town Berkhout, and the Mayor of Bad Kissingen (as a representative from a town suburb that also carries the name Winkels).

== Infrastructure and Facilities ==
- Kindergarten
- Volunteer Fire Brigade Winkels founded 1928 (incl. a Young Fire Fighters Club founded 30. März 1985)

== Clubs and Organisations ==
- Athletic- and Sport Club (1898) Winkels
- Male Choir Männergesangverein-Frohsinn (1895)
- Schützenverein (Hunting and marksmen Club) St. Sebastian (1963)
- Brass Band (1953) Winkels
- Women's- and Mothers Club

== Places of interest ==
- Castle Maienburg (Eigenberg)
- Church of Winkels, built 1880
- The Waldsee Lake

== Notable Persons from Winkels ==
- Abbot Bonifatius Becker (1898–1981)

== Partner Town ==
Berkhout (52°38′N, 5°0′E) is a town in the Dutch province of North Holland. It is a part of the municipality of Wester-Koggenland, and lies about 5 km (3.1 mi) west of Hoorn.
