= Bonifatius Becker =

German abbot (1898–1981)

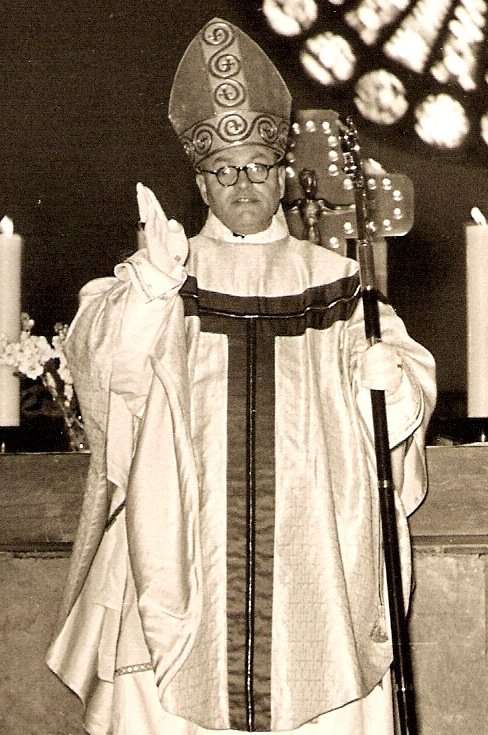
Bonifatius Becker after his Consecration as Abbot in 1956

Bonifatius Becker OSB (31 October 1898 – 9 May 1981) was the first resident abbot in more than 100 years of the Kornelimünster Abbey, a monastery near Aachen rebuilt in 1956. He served as abbot between 1956 and 1967.

He was born Josef Becker in Winkels, Westerwald, Hesse-Nassau, Prussia, German Empire, the eldest of 11 children. He became a trained bricklayer, and worked in his parents' building business in Wanne-Eickel, where they had resettled during the Great Depression.

He joined the Benedictines at Ilbenstadt Abbey in 1930 as a late vocation. There he took holy orders and was ordained priest in 1937. In May 1939 he was named prior of Kornelimünster monastery, and after it was raised to the status of an abbey in 1953, he was named Apostolic Administrator.

On 9 March 1956 he was elected abbot of the abbey and on 23 March 1956 received a canonical visitation by Dr. Ildefons Schulte-Strathaus, Abbot of the Abbey of Siegburg, who presented him the insignia of office. On 27 May 1956, he received his benediction in the recently rebuilt abbey, a project begun under his supervision, following its consecration on 2 May 1956 by the Bishop of Aachen, Johannes Pohlschneider. Bonifatius Becker was abbot until 1967 when he retired for health reasons. He died at Kornelimünster in 1981.
