= Mengerskirchen =

- Municipality
- Flag Coat of arms

- Location of Mengerskirchen within Limburg-Weilburg district
- Interactive map of Mengerskirchen
- Location within Germany Location within Hesse
- Coordinates: 50°33′50″N 08°09′21″E
- Country: Germany
- State: Hesse
- Admin. region: Gießen
- District: Limburg-Weilburg

Government
  - Mayor (2023–29): Daniel Melchert

Area
  - Total: 30.82 km^{2} (11.90 sq mi)
- Elevation: 430 m (1,410 ft)

Population (2025-12-31)
  - Total: 5,687
  - Density: 184.5/km^{2} (477.9/sq mi)
- Time zone: UTC+01:00 (CET)
  - Summer (DST): UTC+02:00 (CEST)
- Postal codes: 35794
- Dialling codes: 06476
- Vehicle registration: LM, WEL
- Website: www.mengerskirchen.de

Mengerskirchen is a municipality in Limburg-Weilburg district in Hesse, Germany.

== Geography ==
=== Neighbouring communities ===
Mengerskirchen borders in the north on the community of Greifenstein (Lahn-Dill-Kreis), in the east on the community of Löhnberg, in the south on the communities of Merenberg and Waldbrunn (all three in Limburg-Weilburg), and in the west on the communities of Neunkirchen, Elsoff and Oberrod (all three in the Westerwaldkreis in Rhineland-Palatinate).

=== Constituent communities ===
Mengerskirchen’s Ortsteile are, Dillhausen, Mengerskirchen, Probbach, Waldernbach and Winkels.

The community administration’s seat is the market centre of Mengerskirchen. Each of the constituent communities is represented on a municipal advisory board (Ortsbeirat) by a community head (Ortsvorsteher).

== Tourism ==
=== Sightseeing ===
- Burg Mengerskirchen (castle)
- Acidic mineral springs in Dillhausen and Probbach
- Maienburg (Eigenberg) castle ruins near Winkels
- Winkels church built in 1880

=== Sport ===
Around the Knoten, the highest elevation in the community of Mengerskirchen, those who are interested can give themselves over to cross-country skiing during the winter months. In summer, the two man-made lakes, Seeweiher and Waldsee, offer the opportunity to bathe.

== History ==
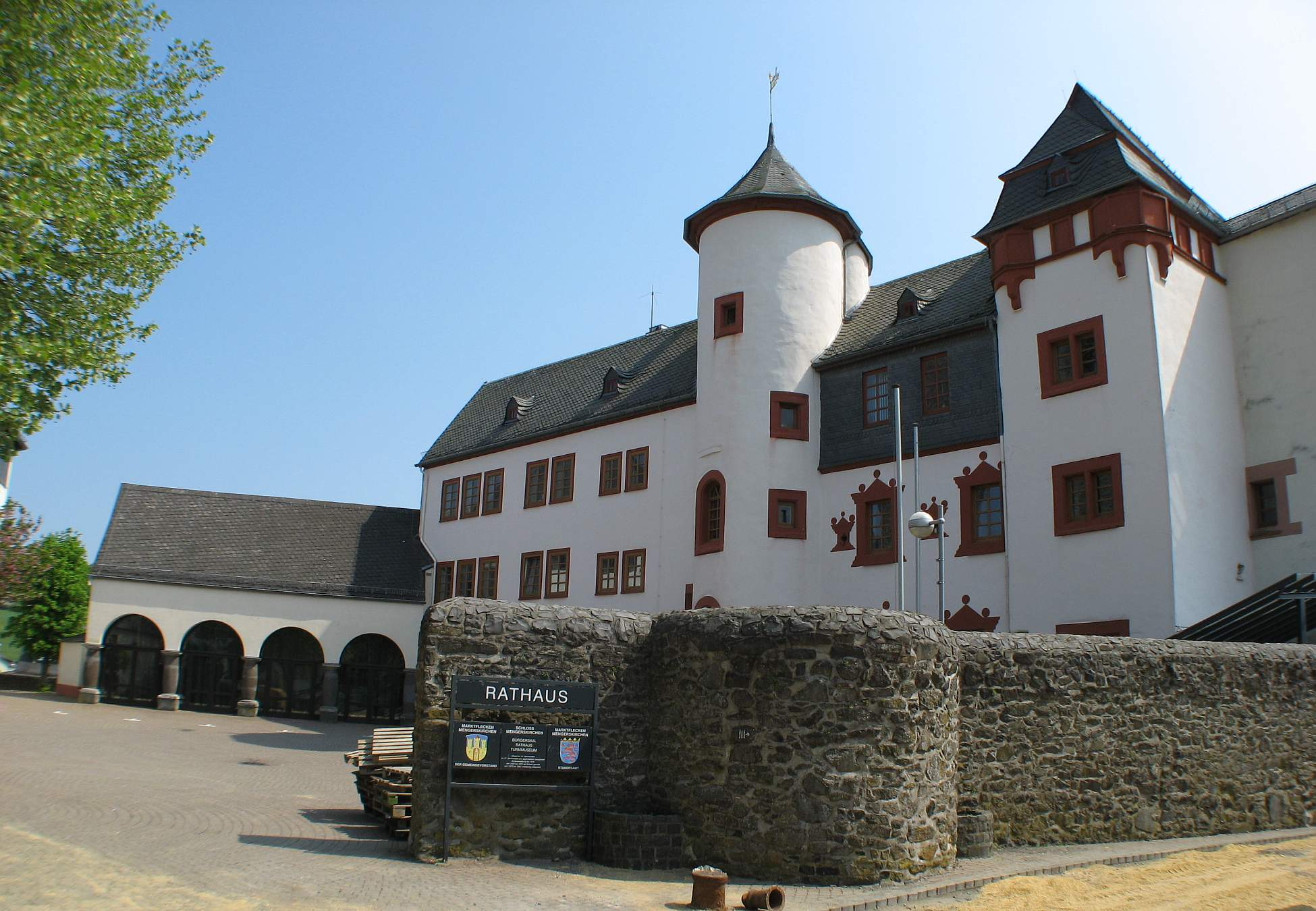
Mengerskirchen Castle

Mengerskirchen had its first documentary mention in a document from the monastery St. Lubentius, Dietkirchen, in 1279. The outlying community of Winkels had already been mentioned in 1243, Waldernbach in 1296, Probbach in 1299 and Dillhausen in 1307. Mengerskirchen was described in 1307 as an “oppidum”. Town rights are documentarily confirmed only on 18 February 1321. In 1481 came market rights, too.

Near Mengerskirchen ran the hill fort wall Rentmauer, affording the community dwellers at that time some protection. There is proof that the community had its own priest and that it also served as the centre of the Calenberg tithing area in 1313, in which year it is believed building work began on Mengerskirchen Castle. Together with the courts of Beilstein, Haimau (today Löhnberg) and Nenderoth, a tithing court was kept on the Kalenbergskopf, a high ridge between Arborn, Mengerskirchen and Nenderoth. In 1481 Friedrich III conferred the privilege for a yearly fair to be held on 14 September near Mengerskirchen.

From 1343 to 1561, Mengerskirchen lay under Nassau-Beilstein rule, then passing along with all Nassau-Beilstein’s holdings back to Nassau-Dillenburg. Count Otto II of Nassau-Dillenburg bequeathed Mengerskirchen to his wife, Adelheid von Vianden as a widow’s seat.

At the crossroads where the two old trade roads, the Hohe Straße (“High Road”) from Herborn to Limburg, and the Rheinstraße from Cologne to Frankfurt, meet, an important customs place was built. Its territory comprised Almenrod, Arborn, Cödlingen, Dillhausen, Helmenrod, Nenderoth, Nieder- and Oberprobbach (today simply Probbach), Obershausen, Odersberg and Winkels, thereby making Mengerskirchen bigger than the actual Residence of Beilstein. The castle in Mengerskirchen housed the Amt of Mengerskirchen with many interruptions until 1816. The last Amtmann retired in this year and the Amt was united with the Amt of Weilburg.

In 1867, Prussia created through a new ordering of the Duchy of Nassau, which it had annexed the year before this, among others, the district of Oberlahnkreis to which Mengerskirchen thereafter belonged. In the administrative reform in Hesse in 1974, it was grouped into the district of Limburg-Weilburg. On 1 January 1971, the market town of Mengerskirchen became the administrative seat of the like-named greater community.

== Politics ==
=== Community council ===
The municipal election held on 26 March 2006 yielded the following results:

Parties and voter communities		% 2006	seats 2006	% 2001	seats 2001
CDU	Christian Democratic Union of Germany	59.0	15	59.9	15
SPD	Social Democratic Party of Germany	28.0	7	28.0	7
FWG	Freie Wähler- und Wählerinnengemeinschaft Mengerskirchen	13.0	3	12.1	3
Total		100.0	25	100.0	25
voter turnout in %		47.3		56.9	

== Economy and infrastructure ==
=== Transport ===
Mengerskirchen is not directly linked to the long-distance road network. The nearest interchanges with Bundesstraße 49 are found in the communities of Merenberg and Löhnberg (about 5 km or 3 miles away). The nearest interchanges with the A 45 (Dortmund–Aschaffenburg) are found in the town of Herborn (about 18 km or 11 miles away). Ever since the narrow-gauge Kerkerbachbahn (railway) was closed in 1958, there has been no railway line. Frankfurt and Frankfurt Airport lies some 85 km (53 mi) away.

=== Education ===
In the community of Mengerskirchen there is one primary school and one Hauptschule-Realschule. Furthermore, other secondary schools are attended in Weilburg.

==== Franz-Leuninger-Schule ====
In the main centre of Mengerskirchen stands the Franz-Leuninger-Schule, the community’s primary school. It was named after the German Resistance fighter against the Nazi régime, Franz Leuninger, who was from Mengerskirchen.

==== Westerwaldschule ====
In the outlying centre of Waldernbach is found the Westerwaldschule, opened on 21 October 1977, a Hauptschule and Realschule for the communities of Mengerskirchen, Merenberg, Waldbrunn (except Ellar), and Beselich (constituent community of Heckholzhausen).

=== Public institutions ===
- Kindergarten Mengerskirchen
- Kindergarten Waldernbach
- Kindergarten Winkels und Probbach
- Kindergarten Dillhausen
- Mengerskirchen Volunteer Fire Brigade, founded in 1898 (includes Youth Fire Brigade)
- Dillhausen Volunteer Fire Brigade, founded in 1927 (includes Youth Fire Brigade)
- Probbach Volunteer Fire Brigade, founded in 1934 (includes Youth Fire Brigade)
- Waldernbach Volunteer Fire Brigade, founded in 1925 (includes Youth Fire Brigade)
- Winkels Volunteer Fire Brigade, founded in 1928 (includes Youth Fire Brigade)

== Famous people ==
- Franz Leuninger (1898–1945), German Resistance fighter against the Nazi régime
