= Rosenhang Museum =

- Location: Weilburg, Germany
- Coordinates: 50.486636°N 8.269577°E
- Type: Contemporary art museum
- Founder: Joachim Legner
- Website: www.villa-rosenhang.de

The Rosenhang Museum is a museum for contemporary art. It is located in Weilburg an der Lahn, a climatic spa town of 13,000 inhabitants, between Limburg and Wetzlar in Hesse. It is a private museum open to the public, founded by Joachim Legner, at the instigation of international gallerist Michael Schultz, who is also the chairman of the Nassauischer Museumsverein Weilburg (Nassau Museum Society Weilburg).

The museum occupies an old brewery building, partly rebuilt, and houses the Legner collection. The collection comprises works by contemporary artists working in Germany, such as Christopher Lehmpfuhl, Cornelia Schleime, Elvira Bach and SEO as well as by Gerhard Richter, Markus Lüpertz and Stephan Balkenhol.

The museum organizes exhibitions of contemporary art focusing on artists from the region. Old Masters are the subject of special shows. The institution's intent is to bring contemporary art to the province while addressing art lovers from all over Germany and the town's international visitors.
