= France terre d'asile =

French asylum rights organization

France terre d'asile (France asylum land) is a French, non-profit organisation that supports asylum seekers and advocates for asylum rights. It was created in 1971. Among other activities, it manages housing centres for asylum seekers (CADA). France terre d'asile promotes solidarity, protection, justice and citizenship in Europe.

France terre d'asile supports unaccompanied foreign minors, regularized immigrants and detained foreigners. It aims to support every migrant person, particularly refugees and stateless people, as defined in the Geneva Conventions and the New York protocol and convention.

The association is a member of the Fundamental Rights Agency of the European Union, of the European Council on Refugees and Exiles, and of the United Nations Economic and Social Council. It is an independent and secular organization.

== History ==
From its creation in 1971, France terre d'asile worked to welcome asylum seekers in France and to guarantee the implementation of international conventions on asylum rights.

In 2007 it changed its legal status. Thereafter France terre d'asile expanded its scope.

In 2012 it entered Tunisia and participated in the creation of a house of the rights and of the migrations by the civil society.

== Critiques ==
The organization has a budget of 69 million euros, mostly from public subsidy (70% from the minister of the interior). It employs 902 persons. It was criticized for the large amount of its subsidy. France terre d'asile explained that it uses this money to implement public policies, which is different from classic subsidy.

France terre d'asile is regularly criticised for its close relationships with political authorities.
