= Gert Fritz Unger =

Gert Fritz Unger (March 23, 1921, Breslau – August 3, 2005, Weilburg) was a German writer and author of Wild West novels.

== Life ==
After studying mechanical engineering, Unger won German youth swimming competitions at the end of the 1930s. He served in the German submarine force as a torpedo mechanic at the outbreak of World War II and ended up as a British prisoner of war.

After returning to Germany, Unger moved to the Ruhr region and initially worked as a fitter and craftsman in Gelsenkirchen; one of his first jobs was repairing the defective clock at Buer town hall. Later, he was responsible for major projects as a site manager at the Siemens company.

In 1949, Unger took part in a competition organized by the Nordwestdeutscher Rundfunk radio station and won first prize with his entry for a detective radio play, whereupon he began writing novels in his spare time and later concentrated on the genre of the Western. Initially, however, Unger wrote sea adventures - inspired by his time in the Navy. At the request of his publisher, he put his first Western on paper. At Uta Publishing, Unger collaborated on the Billy Jenkins, Tom Prox, and Pete series of novels and wrote his first independent western. From 1951 he was a full-time writer. In 1960, Unger moved from the Ruhr region to Weilburg in Hesse. From 1972, Bastei-Verlag published his novels, including in the series Western-Bestseller von G.F. Unger with numerous cover motifs by the Spanish painter and artist Vicente B. Ballestar, and from 1973 Unger was given his own series by Zauberkreis Verlag.

At the height of his activity, Unger wrote a novel almost weekly; later, this number dropped to six new novels a year, which were always first published in paperback before being reprinted in the magazine novel. On August 3, 2005, Unger died of a short, serious illness at the age of 84.

After Unger's death, Bastei-Verlag published not only new editions of two series in booklet format and one series in paperback format, but also ten paperbacks with the imprint "Neuer Roman" ("New Novel"), although none of these novels bore any reference to the author's passing. All of them were manuscripts that Unger had completed before his death.

== Services ==
Unger's publications can be found in various publishing houses, including Zauberkreis, Pabel, Indra, and Kelter. At first, he wrote mostly rental books for the commercial lending libraries that prospered in the 1950s, which were later reprinted as staple novels. Later, when the paperback market gained a strong foothold, Unger managed to gain a foothold there. Except for his early contributions from the 1950s to the Billy Jenkins and Tom Prox series, for which he wrote a total of about 25 booklets, probably only one of his novels (Skull Ranch Volume 1) was originally published as a booklet. Normally - contrary to Unger's current image as a booklet novelist - his 742 Westerns were first published in book form, namely as a rental book or paperback, and only the reprints appeared as novel booklets.

In addition to his civil name, Unger used various pseudonyms for his publications, such as G. F. Bucket or A. F. Peters. However, it is a widespread misconception that Unger hides behind all "G. F." pseudonyms. For example, G. F. Barner, G. F. Wego and G. F. Waco stand for Gerhard Friedrich Basner.

Due to the high total circulation of his works, he became the most successful German-language Western author. At the same time, he is the first and, besides Thomas Jeier and Alfred Wallon, the only German-language Western author whose works were published as translations in the USA. The numerous reprints and new editions of the approximately 742 Western novels and others exceed more than 300 million copies.

Unger's novels, when told in the third person, are written in the present tense, while those told in the first person are in the past tense. His stories follow cowboys as protagonists in defending and maintaining honor. Thus, in Unger's understanding, a Western is "the lonely struggle of a single man against a destiny."

Unger's literary role models included Mark Twain, Jack London and Louis L'Amour, according to his own statements.

== Links ==
- Literature by and about Gert Fritz Unger in the German National Library catalogue
- "Nachruf". Der Spiegel.
