= MYLA =

Legal nonprofit

Macedonian Young Lawyers Association (MYLA) is non-governmental, nonprofit and nonpolitical organization founded in 1994 as a professional NGO established with free association of citizens with aim to implement actions for full implementation of the rule of law principle, and enforcement of the contribution of young lawyers in the development of the legal profession in North Macedonia through projects and activities.

== History ==
Immediately after it establishment in 2003 MYLA had participated in the preparation of the “Legal profession reform INDEX” in cooperation with the American Bar Association – Central and Eastern European Legal Initiative. The cooperation with ABA-CEELI has continued also in the following years in projects related to the legal profession and also combating corruption in the local communities.

In 2005 MYLA commenced fruitful cooperation with the Council of Europe through organization of advanced training for lawyers and legal professionals on issues related to the legal protection of the human rights within the system established with the European Convention of Human Rights. From 2005 to 2013 MYLA organised more than 13 training events which were attended by more than 300 lawyers and legal professionals.

The same year cooperation was established with the Organization for Security and Cooperation in Europe (OSCE) which in the following years will be effectuated through organization of training for the law on criminal procedure, continuous education for young lawyers and publication of manual for legal skills for defense lawyers in criminal procedures.

In 2006 MYLA started with implementation of activities for protection of the right to access to information in cooperation with the Foundation Open Society Macedonia and Swedish Helsinki Committee. Monitoring of the implementation of the Law on free access to information of public character, training for lawyers and NGOs and also legal assistance in the cases where access to information will be denied.

In 2007 MYLA expanded its scope of work with the right of access to justice through activities aimed at adoption of an efficient law on legal aid for the impoverished population. Simultaneously with the adoption of the law in 2009 MYLA began a process of monitoring of the implementation of the Law in cooperation with FOSM and SHC which later with support from FOSM had grown to a broad project which is implemented continuously and which includes: monitoring of the implementation of the Law, preparation of analysis, lobbying and advocacy, provision of preliminary legal aid and also promotion of the right to free legal aid. MYLA also from 2011 is an authorized organization for provision of legal aid.

In 2008 MYLA started with implementation of activities in the field of legal protection from discrimination and unequal treatment. In this area MYLA is implementing training for lawyers, preparation of reports and analysis, strategic litigation and also promotion and popularization of the legal mechanisms for combating discrimination.

In 2009 MYLA with cooperation with the Westminster Foundation for Democracy, International Bar Association and the Assembly of Republic of North Macedonia had implemented the project “The role of the parliament in maintaining the rule of law principle and implementation of the constitutional obligations and human rights guarantees".

In 2010 MYLA started cooperation with the UN High Commissioner for Refugees (UNHCR) in provision of legal assistance, representation and integration of refugees, asylum seekers and stateless persons which continues in the following years.

Due to its work MYLA in 2012 was identified by the Judicial strengthening project funded by USAID as a professional organization of lawyers and support was provided for strengthening the institution.

== Activities ==
1. Representation of the interests of the young lawyers and theirs continuous education and networking;
2. Legal protection of the stateless persons, refugees and asylum seekers;
3. Аccess to justice and support to improvement of the effectiveness of the Law on legal aid;
4. Prevention and protection of discrimination and un-equal treatment;
5. Monitoring of the implementation of the laws related to human rights protection and the judiciary.

MYLA is a member of European Council on Refugees and Exiles.
