= Pro Asyl =

German pro immigration organization

- Formation: 1986; 40 years ago
- Founder: among others: Jürgen Micksch; Herbert Leuninger
- Type: Non-profit NGO
- Headquarters: Frankfurt, Germany
- Services: Protecting human rights
- Fields: Lobbying, research, consultancy.
- Members: 25.000 (2025)
- Secretary General: Beate Wagner
- Management: Karl Kopp, Helen Rezene
- Affiliations: European Council on Refugees and Exiles (ECRE)
- Budget: 6.020.618 EUR (2025)
- Website: www.proasyl.de

PRO ASYL is Germany's largest pro-immigration advocacy organization. Founded in 1986 by Protestant pastor Jürgen Micksch [de], Catholic priest Herbert Leuninger, and others, it has over 25,000 members and an annual budget of more than €6.020.618 (as of 2025). It supports asylum in Germany, in Europe, and worldwide.

== Working fields ==
Pro Asyl provides individual support to refugees, including legal advice and representation in court, if necessary up to the level of Germany's Constitutional Court or the European Court of Human Rights.

The organization also lobbies politically for the rights of refugees by launching campaigns and taking part in panel and TV discussions. Politically, Pro Asyl strives for "a humane society, open towards foreigners."In 2004, Pro Asyl and partner organizations from seven Central European countries founded the European Refugee Fund. Pro Asyl is also a member of the European Council on Refugees and Exiles (ECRE) and works closely with the UNHCR, as well as with other international human rights organizations. Through their pan-European network of correspondents, Pro Asyl conducts analyses and surveys regarding the situation of refugees in their countries of origin, as well as on their escape routes and intermediate stopovers.

Pro Asyl played a key role in advocating for the rights of asylum seekers in the years following 2015, when over one million people, primarily from Syria and Afghanistan, arrived in Germany. It campaigned against the growing anti-immigration politics fuelled by the rise of the far right, and lobbied against the implementation of new European immigration laws 2024. Pro Asyl celebrated its 40th birthday in 2026.

== Awards ==
The organization received a number of awards of national relevance, including the Bonhoeffer-Prize 1998, the Aachener Friedenspreis 2001, and the Theodor-Heuss-Medal 2008.
