= Franz Leuninger =

German trade unionist and resistance activist (1898–1945)

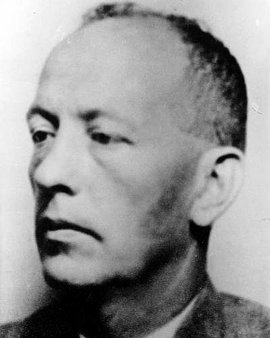
- Born: 28 December 1898; Mengerskirchen, German Empire
- Died: 1 March 1945 (aged 46); Plötzensee Prison, Berlin, Germany
- Cause of death: Execution
- Occupations: Trade union leader; Politician; Resistant
- Organizations: Construction workers' trade union; Deutsches Heim

Franz Leuninger (28 December 1898 – 1 March 1945) was a German trade unionist, politician and resistant against the Nazis' rise to power and regime. Working as a bricklayer after school, he became a member of the trade union for construction workers early on, serving as its regional leader in Silesia in the 1920s. He was a member of the city council of Breslau for the Zentrumspartei from 1930, and ran for the German Reichstag in 1933, as a strong opponent of the Nazi party.

After the 20 July 1944 plot to assassinate Hitler, he was arrested as one of the personalities planned for leading positions in a new beginning. Months later, he was sentenced to death and executed. He is remembered as a man who sacrificed his life consciously, based on his Christian faith, to fight against an unjust regime. He was introduced as a martyr of the 20th century by the Catholic Church, and a school and streets were named after him.

== Early life and career ==
Leuninger was born in Mengerskirchen in the Westerwald region, the third of nine children of the farmer and smith Weinand Leuninger and his wife Elisabeth. He was raised with a strong Christian background, laying the foundation for his belief in human rights such as dignity and freedom of conscience (Menschenwürde und Gewissensfreiheit). After elementary school, despite his abilities, the family could not afford to enroll him in higher education. He took jobs in building farm roads in his hometown, then, not even 14 years old, helping one of his brothers in construction work in Remscheid. He then worked as a bricklayer in the Siegerland region. In the winter season, when construction stopped, he assisted his father in smithing.

During the First World War, he was drafted and served until the end of the war. He ended the war with the rank of Unteroffizier. Afterwards, he worked as bricklayer in the Aachen region. He joined a Christian trade union for construction workers early on, the Christlicher Bauarbeiterverband, a subdivision of Christian trade unions. He became its local secretary in Aachen in 1922. In 1924, he married Anna Paulina Meuser in Mengerskirchen. He rose to district secretary, and worked in the same function in Euskirchen. He was then called to service in Krefeld, where the couple moved into a first apartment together, and three sons were born, Franz, Walter and Herbert. From 1927, not even 30 years old, he led the trade union in Breslau where he was responsible for Silesia. He was a member of the Deutsche Zentrumspartei, elected to the city council of Breslau in 1930. In March 1933, he ran for the German Reichstag; in his campaign, he was a strong opponent of the Nazi party. He warned urgently of the consequences of them taking over the government, foreseeing the damage to the trade unions in particular, and democracy, justice and freedom in general. He said in an election meeting in 1932 that all present would lose their homeland (Heimat) if Hitler came to power. Some were irritated by the combination of union manager and Zentrumspartei, but Leuninger clarified that his sense for justice would demand him to stay faithful to the interests of workers even against party interests.

== Under the Nazis ==
After the Nazis came to power, free trade unions were banned, and Leuninger was laid off. After being unemployed for a short time, he took over the management of a non-profit housing association (Siedlungsgesellschaft) called Deutsches Heim (German home), for which he had already worked voluntarily. In this position, he was able to offer jobs to people who criticized the regime. He came into contact with the resistance groups around Carl Goerdeler, the mayor of Leipzig, Ludwig Beck, the Army's Chief of General Staff and a leader in the anti-Hitler resistance, and the Christian trade unionist Jakob Kaiser.

In World War II, Leuninger was drafted to serve in the army in the Invasion of Poland. He wrote in a letter to his brother stating "There is nothing that justifies war, and all means are permitted to prevent a war. Back in Breslau, he agreed to be ready to take over the position of Ober-Präsident of Silesia in the Beck/Goerdeler shadow cabinet in the democratic new beginning which the lotters hoped would follow a successful revolution. After the failure of the assassination attempt on Hitler on 20 July 1944, Leuninger was arrested on 26 September, accused of not having reported the peace negotiations of which he was aware. This was a crime of high treason under the penal code of the time. He remained in custody for several months, while his wife escaped to the West, and their sons were drafted. He was tried by the People's Court on 28 February 1945. He was sentenced to death, and executed the following day on 1 March 1945 in Plötzensee Prison in Berlin, at the age of 46. In a sermon in an ecumenical memorial service at the site on 20 July 1999, Karl Meyer said that Leuninger walked to his execution singing psalms.

Leuninger belonged to those killed when the end of the war was already near. Hermann von Lüninck, who was in prison with him, wrote: "He lived the last days with admirable strength, which can only be explained by his deep Christian faith ... Franz Leuninger was a man who sacrificed his life for us and for his fatherland with great awareness and clear will." ("Mit bewundernswerter, nur aus seinem tief-christlichen Glauben erklärlichen Stärke hat er die letzten Tage gelebt ... Franz Leuninger war ein Mensch, der sein Leben ganz bewusst und klaren Willens für uns und für sein Vaterland geopfert hat.")

== Memorial ==
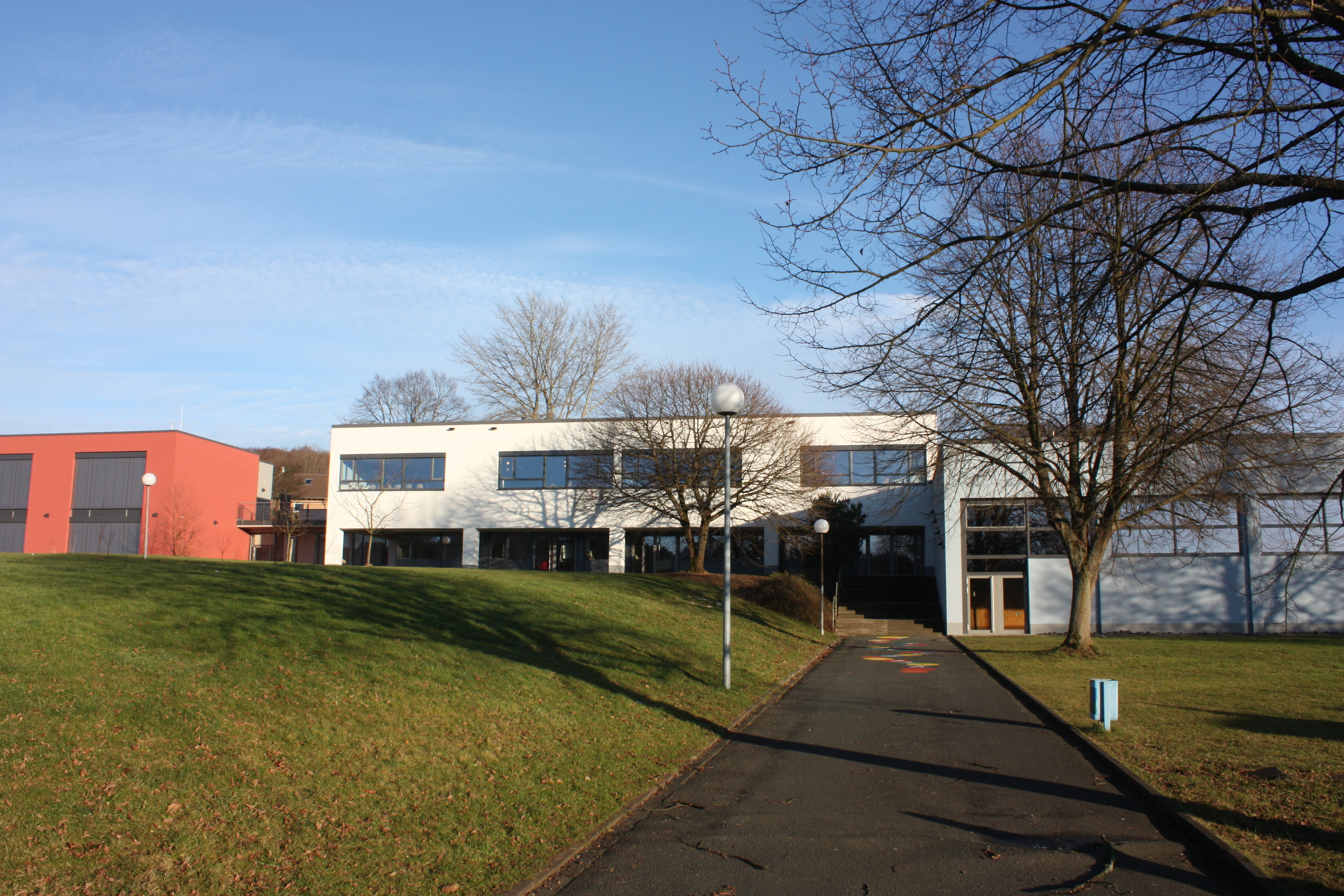
The Franz Leuninger School in Mengerskirchen

The Catholic Church acknowledged Franz Leuninger as a witness of faith (Glaubenszeuge) in a semi-official work entitled the ''German Martyrology of the 20th Century''. Msgr Helmut Moll, commissioned by the German Bishops' Conference to produce the work, memorialized those who died for their Christian ideals as victims of violence (Gewaltopfer). Moll spoke in Remscheid on 23 October 2016, opening an exhibition at St. Suitbertus commemorating Leuninger and two others related to Remscheid, Sister Francis van den Berg and the priest Franz Stappers.

Biographer Günter Buchstab gave a brief portrait of Leuninger as a deeply religious Catholic, who understood Christianity as an entailing an obligation to show solidarity with his fellow men. According to Buchstab, as a trade unionist, Leuninger fought tenaciously and courageously for a more just social order, for the improvement of the situation of the construction workers he represented and their families and as a patriot and upright democrat, he was a determined opponent of political extremism.

The primary school of his birthplace Mengerskirchen in the Limburg-Weilburg district has been named after him. A street near Berlin's Plötzensee Prison, where he was judicially murdered, was named Leuningerpfad after him in 1962, as was in 1984 a street in Hannover's Wettbergen suburb.

== Cited sources ==
- Günter Buchstab (1985). "Leuninger, Franz". Neue Deutsche Biographie (in German). Vol. 14. Berlin: Duncker & Humblot. pp. 375–376. (full text online).
- Laubach, Johannes (20 July 2004). "20. Juli 1944: Franz Leuninger und der Widerstand gegen Hitler / Das Schicksal in die Hände des Herrgotts gelegt. / Ein entschiedener Gegner des Nationalssozialismus". Nassauische Neue Presse (in German).
- Leuninger, Alois (1970). Franz Leuninger zum Gedenken (in German). Mengerskirchen: Herbert Leuninger.
- Leuninger, Alois (1970). Franz Leuninger zum Gedenken (2) (in German). Mengerskirchen: Herbert Leuninger.
- Meyer (20 July 1999). ""Das heilige Deutschland soll leben." / Gedenkstätte Deutscher Widerstand". stiftung-20-juli-1944.de (in German).
- Moll, Helmut (2002). Den Widerstand mit dem Tod bezahlt. Katholiken unter Hitlers Terror im Euskirchener Raum (PDF) (in German). Weilerswist: Euskirchen. pp. 6–8.
- Rauch, Andreas M. (July 2004). "Christliche Märtyrer dem Vergessen entreißen / Zum 60. Jahrestag des Attentates auf Hitler am 20. April 1944" (PDF). Auftrag (in German) (255). Gemeinschaft Katholischer Soldaten: 11–17. Archived from the original (PDF) on 16 September 2021.
- Stirken, Norbert (18 January 2016). "RP-Serie Krefelder Märtyrer : Christlicher Gewerkschafter hingerichtet". Rheinische Post (in German).
- "Franz Leuninger / 28. Dezember 1898 - 01. März 1945". Gedenkstätte Deutscher Widerstand (in German).
- "Execution of Alleged Conspirators in "July 20" Plot". jewishvirtuallibrary.org.
- "Leuningerpfad". berlin.kauperts.de (in German).
- "Märtyrer des 20. Jahrhunderts / Vortrag über christliche Gewaltopfer und Widerständler der NS-Zeit". Diocese of Limburg (in German). 20 October 2018.
- "Kirche zeigt Märtyrer des 20. Jahrhunderts / In der Kirche St. Suitbertus wird die Ausstellung "Märtyrer des Erzbistums Köln im 20. Jahrhundert" mit einem Hochamt eröffnet". Remscheider General-Anzeiger (in German). 20 October 2016.
