= European Council on Refugees and Exiles =

European Council on Refugees and Exiles (ECRE)
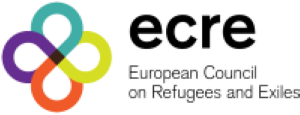
- Founded: 1974
- Type: Non-profit
- Headquarters: Secretariat in Brussels
- Location: Avenue des Arts / Kunstlaan 7-8, 1210, Brussels, Brussels-Capital Region, Belgium
- Services: Protecting and advancing the rights of refugees, asylum seekers, and other forcibly displaced persons in Europe and in Europe’s external policies.
- Fields: Legal Support and Litigation; Advocacy; Communication
- Members: 125 member organisations
- Director: Julie Lejeune
- Website: https://ecre.org/

The European Council on Refugees and Exiles (ECRE) is a pan-European alliance of 125 organisations in 40 countries protecting and advancing the rights of refugees, asylum seekers and other forcibly displaced people. ECRE's mission is to promote the establishment of fair and humane European asylum policies and practices in accordance with international human rights law.

== History ==
The European Council on Refugees and Exiles (ECRE) was established in 1974.

It has developed and continues to manage the Asylum Information Database (AIDA), the European Database of Asylum Law (EDAL) and the European Legal Network on Asylum (ELENA).

== Member Organisations ==
Member organisations
Region	Name	Country
Central Europe	Asylkoordination Österreich	Austria
Central Europe	Diakonie in Österreich	Austria
Central Europe	Plattform Asyl – FÜR MENSCHEN RECHTE	Austria
Central Europe	Verein Projekt Integrationshaus*	Austria
Central Europe	Centre for Refugee Support	Belarus
Central Europe	Afghan LGBT Organization	Czechia
Central Europe	Organization for Aid to Refugees (OPU)	Czechia
Central Europe	Arbeiterwohlfahrt (AWO)	Germany
Central Europe	Caritas Germany	Germany
Central Europe	Diakonie Deutschland	Germany
Central Europe	Der Paritätische Gesamtverband	Germany
Central Europe	Female Fellows	Germany
Central Europe	International Refugee Assistance Project Europe	Germany (International)
Central Europe	PRO ASYL	Germany
Central Europe	Rainbow Afghanistan	Germany
Central Europe	International Refugee Assistance Project (IRAP)	Germany
Central Europe	Hungarian Helsinki Committee	Hungary
Central Europe	Menedék – Hungarian Association for Migrants	Hungary
Central Europe	Association for Legal Intervention (SIP)	Poland
Central Europe	Helsinki Foundation for Human Rights	Poland
Central Europe	Ocalenie Foundation	Poland
Central Europe	Human Rights League	Slovakia
Central Europe	Slovak Humanitarian Council (SHR)	Slovakia
Central Europe	AsyLex	Switzerland
Central Europe	RefugePoint	Switzerland (International)
Central Europe	Swiss Refugee Council	Switzerland
Central Europe	Right to Protection	Ukraine
Central Europe	The Tenth of April	Ukraine
Mediterranean	Cyprus Refugee Council	Cyprus
Mediterranean	Refugee Rights Association	Cyprus
Mediterranean	Emmaüs Europe	France
Mediterranean	Entraide Pierre Valdo	France
Mediterranean	Forum réfugiés	France
Mediterranean	France terre d'asile	France
Mediterranean	French Refugee Council	France
Mediterranean	Safe Passage France	France
Mediterranean	Community Rights in Greece	Greece
Mediterranean	Fenix – Humanitarian Legal Aid	Greece
Mediterranean	Greek Council for Refugees	Greece
Mediterranean	Greek Forum of Refugees	Greece
Mediterranean	HIAS Greece	Greece
Mediterranean	Refugee Support Aegean	Greece
Mediterranean	Safe Passage International A.M.K.E	Greece
Mediterranean	Second Tree	Greece
Mediterranean	SolidarityNow	Greece
Mediterranean	Asilo in Europa	Italy
Mediterranean	Association for Juridical Studies on Immigration (ASGI)*	Italy
Mediterranean	Italian Council for Refugees (CIR)	Italy
Mediterranean	Mosaico – Action for Refugees	Italy
Mediterranean	Refugees Welcome Italia	Italy
Mediterranean	aditus Foundation	Malta
Mediterranean	Jesuit Refugee Service Malta	Malta
Mediterranean	Portuguese Refugee Council (CPR)	Portugal
Mediterranean	Union of Refugees in Portugal (UREP)	Portugal
Mediterranean	Accem	Spain
Mediterranean	Andalucía Acoge Federation	Spain
Mediterranean	Cepaim Foundation	Spain
Mediterranean	Extranjeristas en Red	Spain
Mediterranean	Movement for Peace (MPDL)	Spain
Mediterranean	Red Acoge Federation	Spain
Mediterranean	Rescate Foundation	Spain
Mediterranean	Spanish Commission for Refugee Aid (CEAR)	Spain
Mediterranean	Spanish Red Cross	Spain
Mediterranean	Association for Social Development and Aid Mobilization (ASAM)	Turkey
Mediterranean	Association for Solidarity with Refugees (Mülteci-Der)	Turkey
Mediterranean	Foundation for the Support of Women's Work (KEDV)	Turkey
Mediterranean	Refugee Rights Turkey	Turkey
Mediterranean	Refugee Support Center (MUDEM)	Turkey
Nordic / Baltic	Danish Refugee Council	Denmark
Nordic / Baltic	Estonian Human Rights Centre	Estonia
Nordic / Baltic	Estonian Refugee Council	Estonia
Nordic / Baltic	Finnish Refugee Advice Centre	Finland
Nordic / Baltic	Icelandic Red Cross	Iceland
Nordic / Baltic	Island Panorama Centre	Iceland
Nordic / Baltic	Latvian Centre for Human Rights	Latvia
Nordic / Baltic	Lithuanian Red Cross	Lithuania
Nordic / Baltic	International Cities of Refuge Network*	Norway
Nordic / Baltic	Norwegian Organisation for Asylum Seekers	Norway
Nordic / Baltic	Memorial Human Rights Centre	Russia
Nordic / Baltic	Caritas Sweden	Sweden
Nordic / Baltic	Swedish Network of Refugee Support Groups (FARR)	Sweden
Nordic / Baltic	Swedish Red Cross	Sweden
Nordic / Baltic	Swedish Refugee Law Centre	Sweden
Southeast Europe	Vaša Prava BiH	Bosnia and Herzegovina
Southeast Europe	Bulgarian Helsinki Committee	Bulgaria
Southeast Europe	Bulgarian Red Cross	Bulgaria
Southeast Europe	Refugee Advisory Board	Bulgaria
Southeast Europe	Are You Syrious	Croatia
Southeast Europe	Centre for Peace Studies (CMS)	Croatia
Southeast Europe	Croatian Law Centre (HPC)	Croatia
Southeast Europe	Civil Rights Program Kosovo	Kosovo**
Southeast Europe	Macedonian Young Lawyers' Association (MYLA)	North Macedonia
Southeast Europe	Law Center of Advocates (CDA)	Republic of Moldova
Southeast Europe	Jesuit Refugee Service Romania	Romania
Southeast Europe	Romanian National Council for Refugees (CNRR)	Romania
Southeast Europe	Asylum Protection Center (CZA)	Serbia
Southeast Europe	Belgrade Centre for Human Rights	Serbia
Southeast Europe	Centre for Research and Social Development (IDEAS)	Serbia
Southeast Europe	Grupa 484	Serbia
Southeast Europe	Psychosocial Innovation Network	Serbia
Southeast Europe	Legal Center for the Protection of Human Rights and the Environment (PIC)*	Slovenia
Western Europe	Flemish Refugee Action	Belgium
Western Europe	NANSEN	Belgium
Western Europe	Solentra*	Belgium
Western Europe	ActionAid EU Office	Belgium (International)
Western Europe	Amnesty International European Institutions Office*	Belgium (International)
Western Europe	Caritas Europa	Belgium (International)
Western Europe	Churches' Commission for Migrants in Europe – Conference of European Churches	Belgium (International)
Western Europe	International Catholic Migration Commission	Belgium (International)
Western Europe	International Rehabilitation Council for Torture Victims	Belgium (International)
Western Europe	International Rescue Committee	Belgium (International)
Western Europe	Jesuit Refugee Service Europe	Belgium (International)
Western Europe	Kids in Need of Defense Europe	Belgium (International)
Western Europe	Oxfam EU EU Office	Belgium (International)
Western Europe	SOLIDAR	Belgium (International)
Western Europe	SOS Children's Villages*	Belgium (International)
Western Europe	VOICIFY	Belgium (International)
Western Europe	Irish Refugee Council	Ireland
Western Europe	Passerell	Luxembourg
Western Europe	Dutch Council for Refugees	Netherlands
Western Europe	Foundation for Refugee Students (UAF)	Netherlands
Western Europe	British Red Cross	United Kingdom
Western Europe	Immigration Law Practitioners' Association	United Kingdom
Western Europe	Scottish Refugee Council	United Kingdom
Western Europe	Student Action for Refugees	United Kingdom

*Associate member organisation

**This designation is without prejudice to positions on status and is in line with United Nations Security Council Resolution 1244 and the International Court of Justice Opinion on the Kosovo Declaration of Independence.

== Publications ==
The ECRE Weekly Bulletin includes information about the latest developments in the areas of asylum and refugee protection. The ELENA Legal Update (ELU) includes information about important recent developments in international and European asylum law. The ECRE Press Review consists of a weekly overview of the latest news in the areas of asylum and migration. ECRE publications include comments papers, legal notes, policy notes, policy papers, working papers. ECRE also publishes AIDA reports (country reports, comparative reports and briefings). ECRE legal submissions include legal challenges, interventions and implementation of judgments.

== Social media ==
ECRE is active on the following social media platforms:

- Bluesky: ECRE
- Facebook***: European Council on Refugees and Exiles (ECRE)
- LinkedIn: European Council on Refugees and Exiles (ECRE)
- Instagram: ECRE @theecre
- X***: ECRE @ecre

*** Currently inactive
