= Weilburg =

- Town
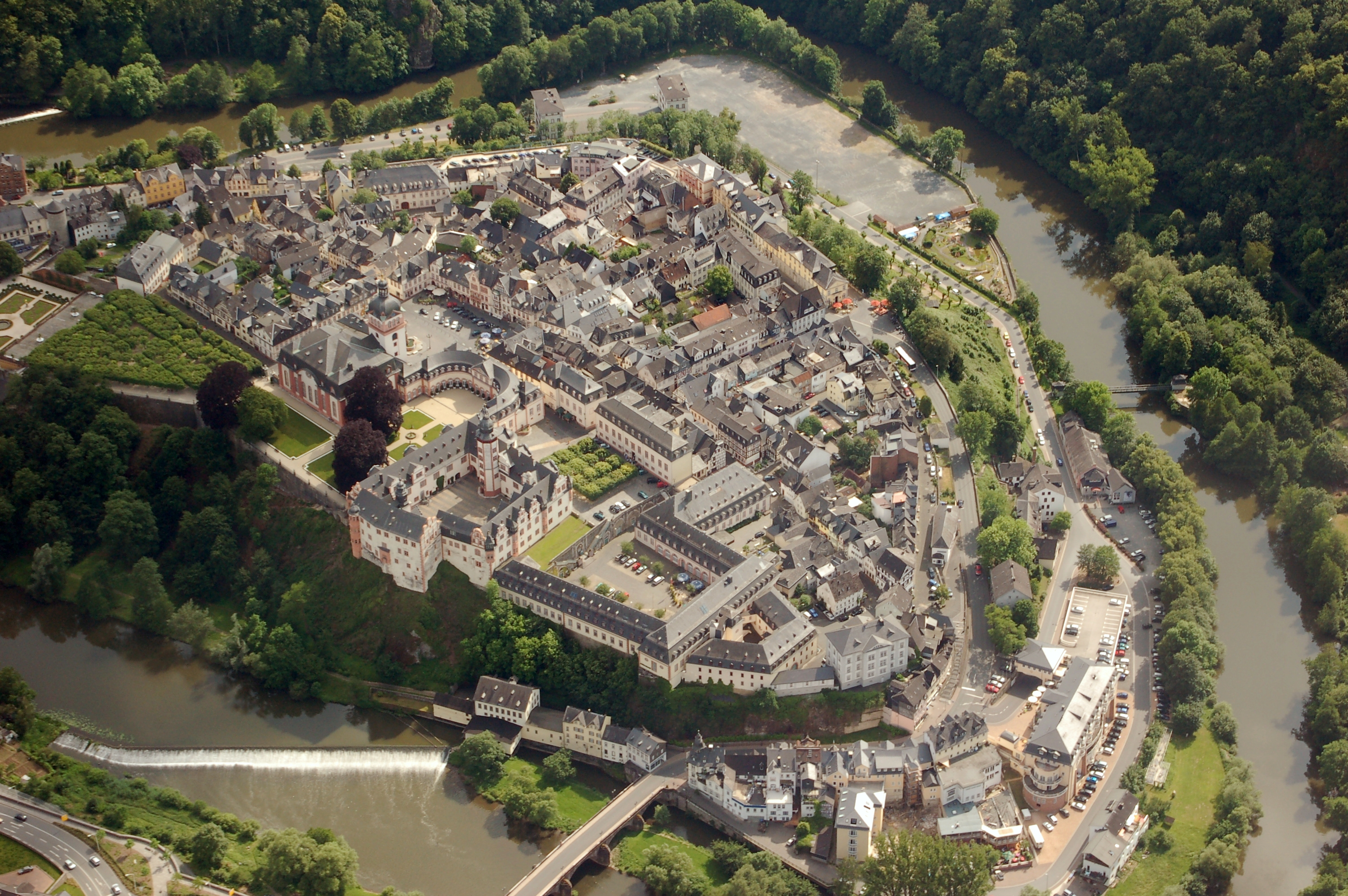
- Aerial view in 2007

- Flag Coat of arms

- Location of Weilburg within Limburg-Weilburg district
- Interactive map of Weilburg
- Location within Germany Location within Hesse
- Coordinates: 50°29′N 8°15′E
- Country: Germany
- State: Hesse
- Admin. region: Gießen
- District: Limburg-Weilburg

Government
  - Mayor (2023–29): Johannes Hanisch (CDU)

Area
  - Total: 57.51 km^{2} (22.20 sq mi)
- Elevation: 152 m (499 ft)

Population (2025-12-31)
  - Total: 13,019
  - Density: 226.4/km^{2} (586.3/sq mi)
- Time zone: UTC+01:00 (CET)
  - Summer (DST): UTC+02:00 (CEST)
- Postal codes: 35781
- Dialling codes: 06471, 06442
- Vehicle registration: LM, WEL
- Website: www.weilburg.de

Logo of the city of Weilburg

Weilburg (German pronunciation: [ˈvaɪlbʊʁk]) is, with just under 13,000 inhabitants, the third biggest town in Limburg-Weilburg district in Hesse, Germany, after Limburg an der Lahn and Bad Camberg.

== Geography ==
=== Location ===
The community lies in the Lahn valley between the Westerwald and the Taunus just upstream from where the Weil empties into the river Lahn and 80 km southeast of Koblenz. The Old Town, built on and around a rocky hill, is almost encircled by the Lahn.

=== Neighbouring communities ===
Weilburg borders in the north on the communities of Merenberg and Löhnberg (both in Limburg-Weilburg), in the east on the town of Braunfels (Lahn-Dill-Kreis), in the south on the communities of Weilmünster and Weinbach as well as on the town of Runkel, and in the west on the community of Beselich (all in Limburg-Weilburg).

=== Constituent communities ===
Besides the main town, in which just under 40% of the inhabitants live, the outlying centres of Ahausen, Bermbach, Drommershausen, Gaudernbach, Hasselbach, Hirschhausen, Kirschhofen, Kubach, Odersbach and Waldhausen also belong to Weilburg's municipal area.

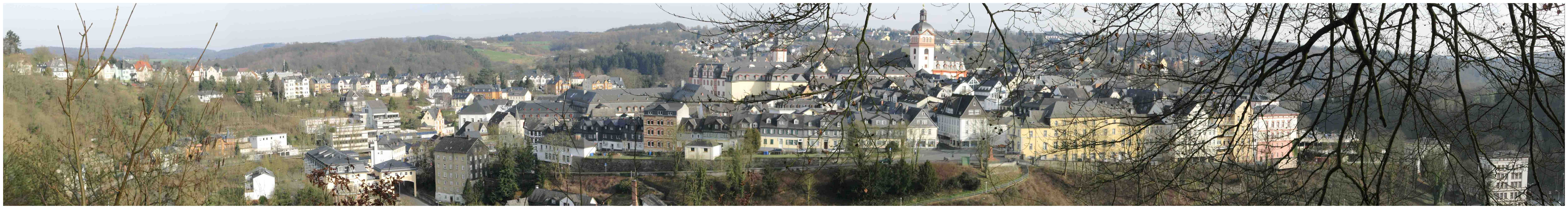
Panorama of Weilburg from the Kanapee

== History ==
It is believed that the earliest traces of settlers in the area around Weilburg are attested by finds from La Tène times from the Scheuernberger Kopf (mountain) near Kirschhofen.

Weilburg was first mentioned in 906 in a chronicle by Abbot Regino of Prüm as a fortification under the name of Wilineburch. Six years later King Conrad I, whose father had been buried in the fortification after having fallen in battle while fighting the Babenbergers near Fritzlar in 906, founded a church and an abbey. In 912, the St. Walpurgis-Chorherrenstift (monastery) was founded. The building, which was built on high ground, afforded the monastery control over the Lahn as well as the Hohe Straße ("High Road") running from Frankfurt to Cologne and the Via Publica from Flanders to Bohemia, which ran nearby.

In 918, the Wilineburg (castle) gained special historic importance when King Conrad I, lying on his deathbed, recommended to his brother Eberhard that he deliver the Imperial insignia to his bitterest rival, the Saxon duke Heinrich (Weilburger Testament).

From 993 to 1062, the town was bit by bit donated to the Bishopric of Worms. About 1225, the Bishop of Worms pledged overlordship over the town to the House of Nassau, which in the end they bought up, granting the place a year later the same town rights held by Frankfurt. Count Johann I of Nassau built his residence here in 1355, renovated the castle to a palace, and also built the town fortifications. In 1359, he had a stone bridge built across the Lahn.

The House of Nassau shaped the town's history for several centuries. Count Johann Ernst (1664–1719), in particular, renovated and beautified his town of residence by expanding the Renaissance high palace (Hochschloss), building a park and changing the town's face. Weilburg thus became one of the most fully preserved examples of a small German residence town from the time of absolutism. From 1806, the town was the governmental seat of the newly created Duchy of Nassau. Only in 1816 did William, Duke of Nassau move his residence to Biebrich. In 1866, the Duchy of Nassau was annexed by Prussia, and in 1871 it became part of the newly established German Empire.

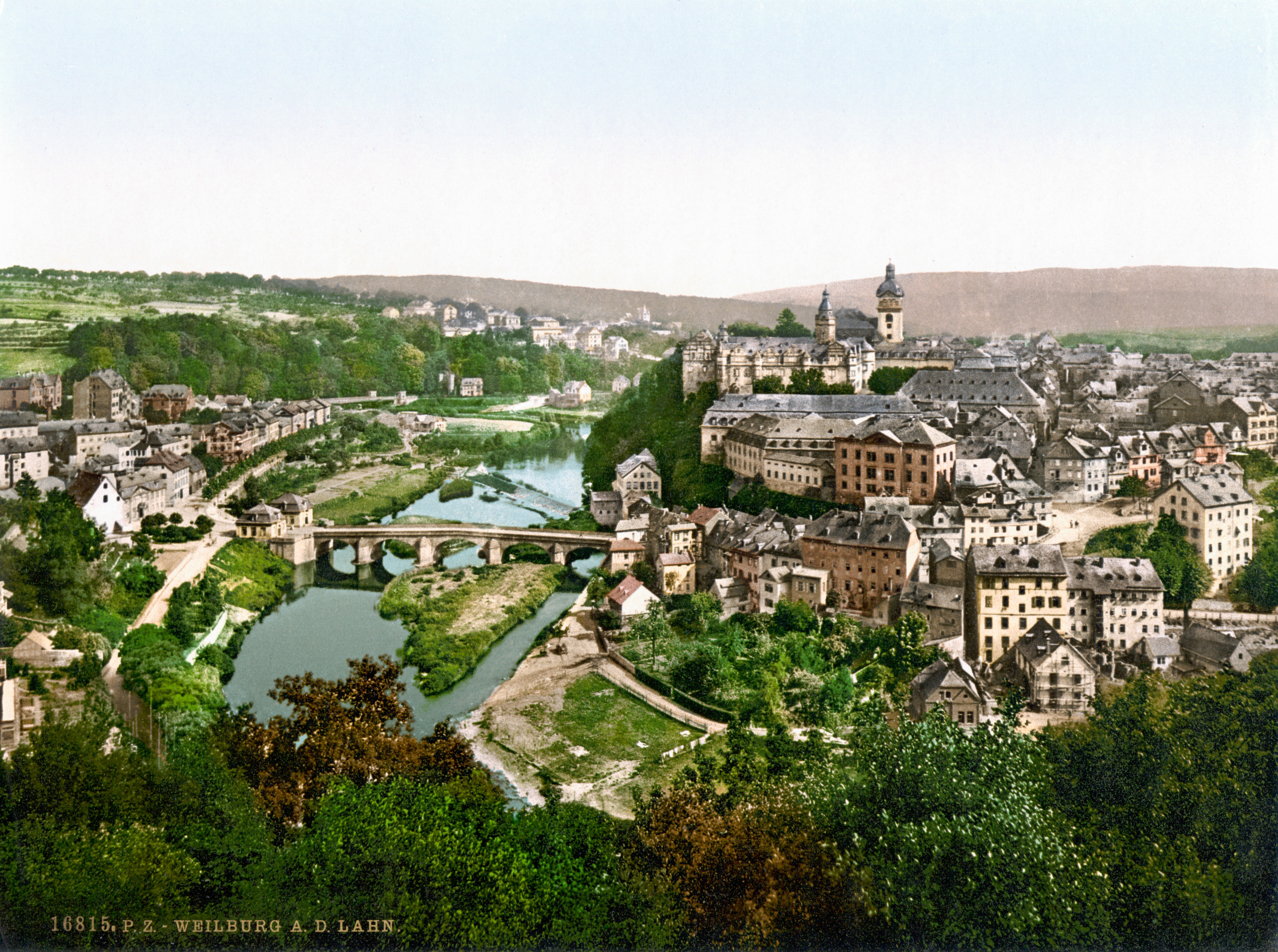
Weilburg at the turn of the 19th and 20th centuries

In the field of architectural history, Weilburg is known for its loam buildings from the time before 1800. Wilhelm Jacob Wimpf, a "government lawyer", was instrumental in furthering the so-called Pisee style of building in the town and its environs, yielding what is still Germany's tallest loam building, a six-floor house.

=== National Socialism and the Second World War ===
In 1933, as in other German cities and towns, the National Socialists were elected into power. Shortly before this, the Nazis in the region had had strong showings in elections. The last non-Nazi mayor chosen by the town council, Diffenhardt, was ousted in a no-confidence vote instigated by the Nazis in the summer of 1933.

During World War II, in 1939–1941, it was the location of the Oflag IX-B prisoner-of-war camp for Polish and Belgian officers and orderlies. In the war, the town sustained only light damage. The middle façade of the palace's orangery collapsed after an aerial bomb meant for the Weilburg railway station fell right in front of the gate and exploded. The railway station and the nearby Helbig brewery house were also damaged. While United States troops were taking over the town on 27 March 1945, the fighting caused some light damage, although all the town's bridges were blown up by retreating German troops.

=== Municipal centre ===
Weilburg was the old Oberlahnkreis's seat from the district's founding in 1867. Weilburg lost this function when, in the course of administrative reform in Hesse, both the Oberlahnkreis and the Limburg district were abolished and the new Limburg-Weilburg district came into being on 1 July 1974, with Limburg as its seat. To this day, however, a district administration outpost can be found at the former district administrator's office on Limburger Straße.

In 2005, the town hosted the 45th Hessentag state festival from 17 to 26 June.

=== Constituent communities' history ===
Ahausen is first mentioned in documents in 1320. The cluster village lies right on the Lahn where the Grundbach empties into it, which explains why the three mills that once stood here.

Under the name Berinbach, the outlying centre of Bermbach was first mentioned in documents in 1253. Besides agriculture, the villagers also worked at mining. Ore was mined from pits in Bermbach's municipal area up until 1914, when operations ceased.

The certification of an estate in 1196 by Pope Celestine III is Drommershausen's first mention in documents. There is historical evidence of an oil mill in 1666, and also, a blast furnace for smelting ironstone mined in the area is mentioned in 1679.

In 1325, under the name Gauderinbach, today's outlying centre of Gaudernbach was first mentioned. At first, the place belonged to the Amt of Runkel and the parish of Schupbach. The chapel consecrated to Saint Peter was built in 1769. A school in the community was mentioned before 1618, although it is unknown how long it lasted. In a great fire in 1863, 68 buildings in Gaudernbach were destroyed. Besides agriculture and mining, villagers found income working in the Gaudernbach marble quarry.

In a document from 1235, the place name Hasilibach was first mentioned, later changing its name to Hasselbach. At the time of its first mention, the community belonged to the Trier Burgmann Johann von Schupbach, who resided in Montabaur.

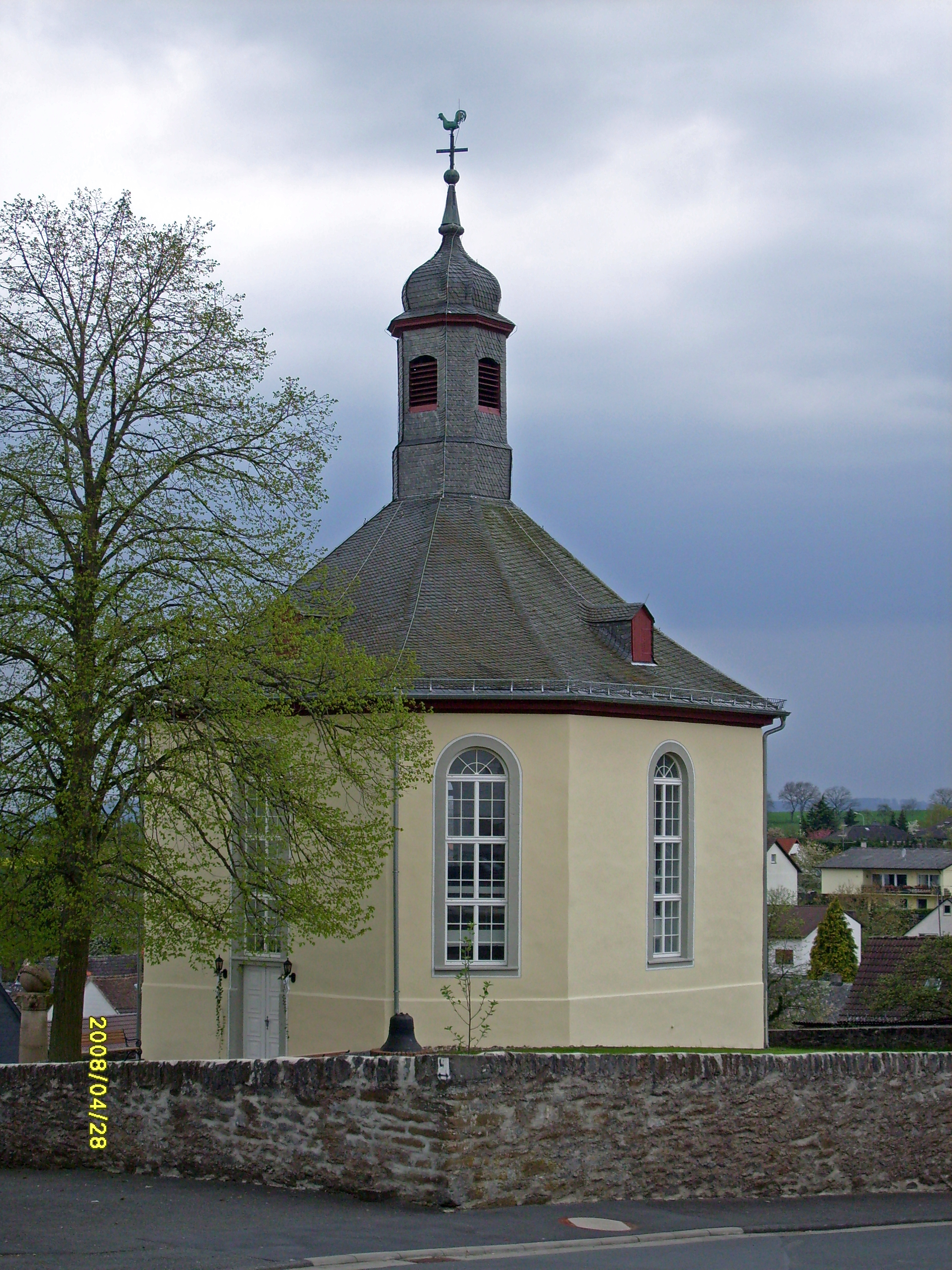
Hirschhausen – Lutheran church 1763

Hirschhausen is first mentioned in documents in 1327, and can be found in writings from 1466 referred to as Herbishusen. In Hirschhausen's municipal area there were many hematite and limonite pits, among which the "Anna" pit was one of the richest in the Lahn area. Worth mentioning is the eight-sided Lutheran church built in 1763 by 27 families from Hirschhausen. Near Hirschhausen, from the 15th to the mid 16th century, was the pilgrimage centre of Pfannstiel.

The outlying centre of Kirschhofen was first mentioned in documents in 1363 with the spelling Kyrchschyrben. The spelling Kirschhofen is known from 1684. Since 1978, Kirschhofen has been linked by footbridge to the outlying centre of Odersbach on the other side of the Lahn.

The constituent community of Kubach was first referred to in documents as parvulam cubach in one of Otto III's documents from 27 December 1000. It is assumed that Kubach had its own church as of 1516. The current church was finished in 1784.

Odersbach and Waldhausen are the two constituent communities which are first mentioned in documents before that of Weilburg's in 906.

Waldhausen was first mentioned in documents in 881 in the Prüm Abbey's Golden Book, in which it is known as Mark Ualthusa in a passage dealing with the settlement there and the Carolingian forest holdings. Until 1960, the villagers earned their livelihood mainly in agriculture and mining.

== Politics ==
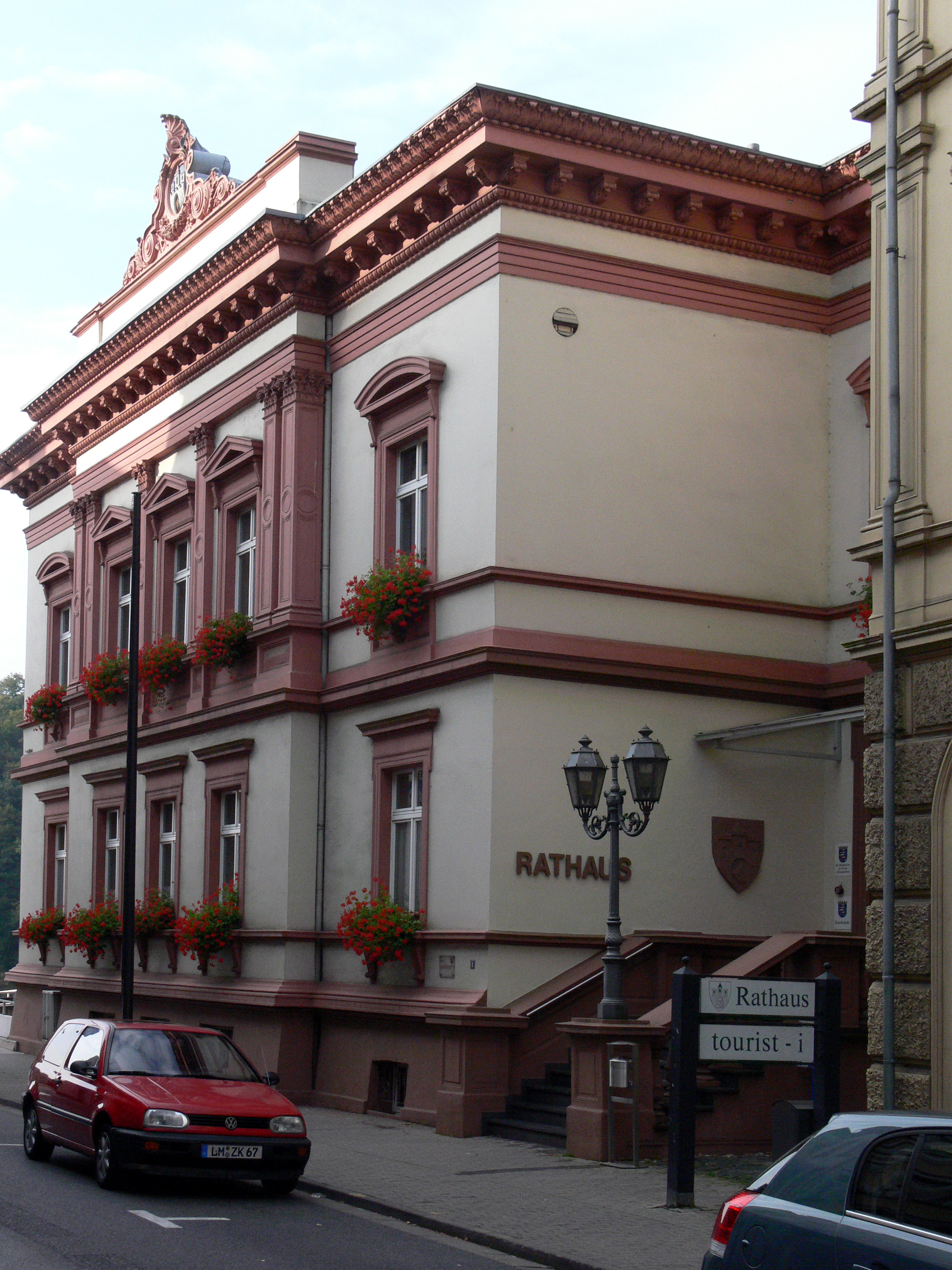
Weilburg's Town Hall

=== Town council ===
The municipal election held on March 6, 2016, yielded the following results:

Parties and voter communities		% 2016	Seats; 2016	% 2011	Seats; 2011	% 2006	Seats; 2006	% 2001	Seats; 2001
CDU	Christian Democratic Union of Germany	31.8	12	34.0	13	35.4	13	32.8	12
SPD	Social Democratic Party of Germany	33.5	12	37.6	14	40.2	15	40.9	15
GRÜNE	Bündnis 90/Die Grünen	9.0	3	13.3	5	6.5	2	5.3	2
FDP	Free Democratic Party	10.4	4	6.0	2	6.6	3	6.4	2
FWG	Freie Wählergemeinschaft	15.4	6	9.0	3	11.3	4	14.6	6
Total		100.0	37	100.0	37	100.0	37	100.0	37
Voter turnout in %		47.8		46.4		43.4		53.2	

=== Mayor ===
Johannes Hanisch has been mayor since July 1, 2017.

=== Town partnerships ===
- Privas, France, since 1958
- Tortona, Italy, since 1964
- Zevenaar, Netherlands, since 1966
- Kežmarok, Slovakia, since 1990
- Quattro Castella, Italy, since 2002
- Colmar-Berg, Luxembourg, since 2004
- Kızılcahamam, Turkey, since 2006

=== Coat of arms ===
The town's arms were granted in 1906 on the occasion of the town's one thousandth anniversary of its first mention in documents. They show a castle in silver on a blue background. The middle tower of the three has a red roof with a golden ball on the peak. The gate, which is shut and strewn with black, is overlaid with a blue inescutcheon, which itself bears the Nassau lion in gold. The arms are modelled on the town's seal from 1329.

=== Flag ===
Weilburg's town flag is a horizontal tricolour in yellow, blue and white. The colours are drawn from the tinctures in the coat of arms, with yellow standing for the gold, and white for the silver. Blue was the former ruling counts' colour.

=== Seal ===
Weilburg's town seal is first known to have appeared in a document dating from 1327, although it seems likely that it was first acquired on the occasion of the granting of town rights in 1295. The seal bears the inscription "SIGILLUM CIVITATIS IN WILBURC" ("Seal of the Citizenry in Weilburg"). The design itself shows a town wall with two corner towers of the same height, between which is a taller tower with a pointed roof, and in the middle of the town wall a town gate with a coat of arms.

Along with this first seal, most likely made in the late 14th century, a smaller seal was also made. A replacement for this seal was introduced by 1650.

Moreover, a further seal to these three others, which all still exist, was made in 1905, and was likewise modelled on the first seal.

== Culture and sightseeing ==
=== Museums ===
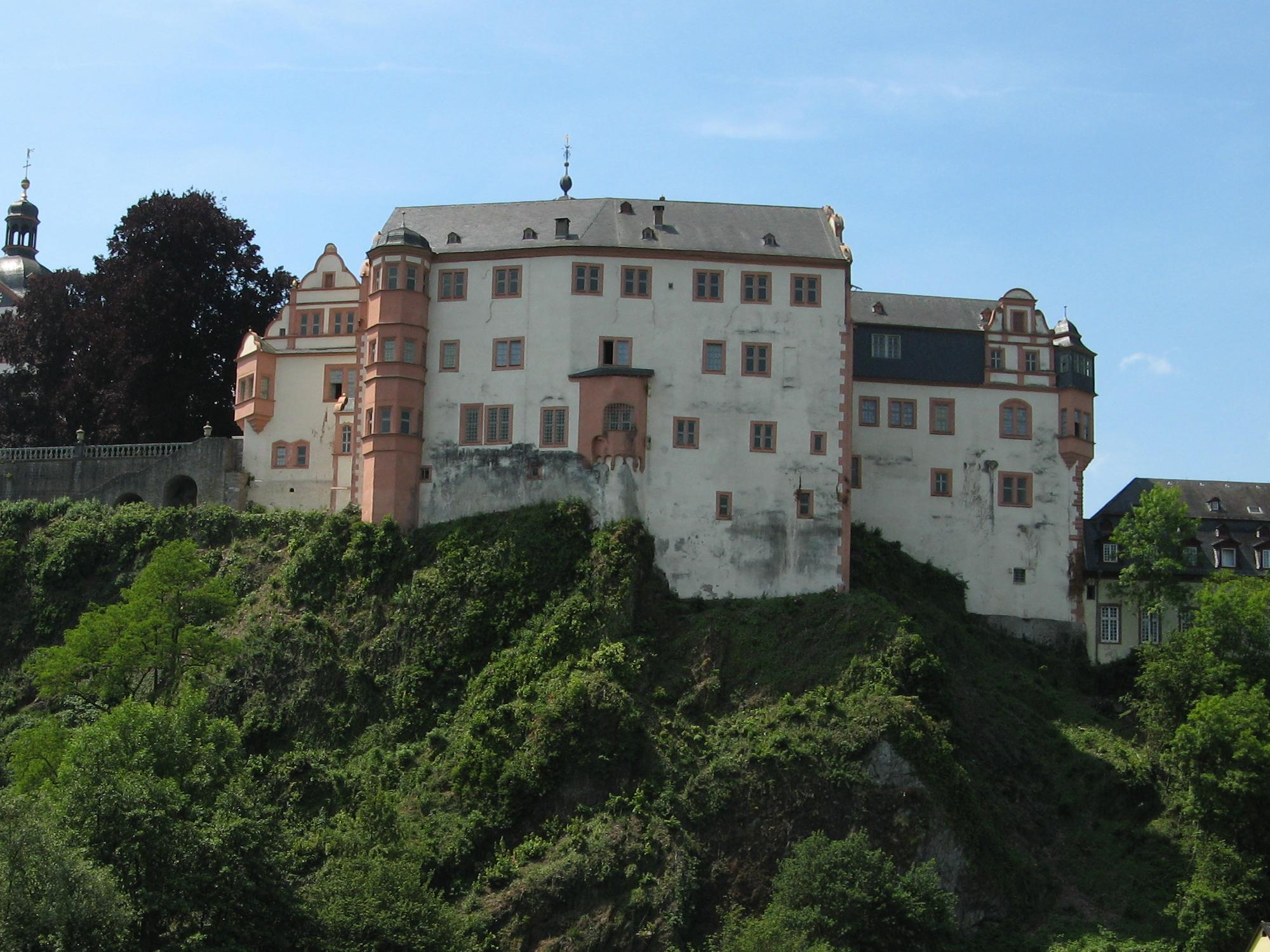
Schloss Weilburg above the Lahn

Schloss Weilburg, the former residential palace of the House of Nassau, Dukes of Nassau-Weilburg, was sold to the State of Prussia in 1935 by Charlotte of Nassau-Weilburg, Grand Duchess of Luxembourg, together with her other Nassau residence, Biebrich Palace at Wiesbaden. The ruling House of Luxemburg kept however the burial chapel of their ancestors. This magnificent palace has been a museum since 1935 and can be visited by guided tour.

Housed in the former chancellery building is Weilburg's Bergbau- und Stadtmuseum ("Mining and Town Museum"), which has at its disposal an exhibit area of 1 200 m^{2}. On display are exhibits on Weilburg's town history and a wide assortment about mining in the town and the neighbouring areas. The museum, which has existed since 1972, making it Hesse's oldest mining museum, has also installed a 200 m-long mining gallery exhibit in which the original mining machinery may be seen.

Since May 2008, a part of the museum has also housed roughly one hundred works of Chinese cut paper artworks. Typically, it is rare to find of Chinese cut paper art outside of China.

In the outlying centre of Gaudernbach is found the Deutsche Baumaschinen-Modellmuseum ("German Building Machine Model Museum"). The museum was founded by the building company Walter Feickert GmbH in 1989. On display here are roughly 1,200 models of building machines and construction sites.

In 2017 the Rosenhang Museum for contemporary art was opened housing the art collection of its founder Joachim Legner. It is located in a historical and renovated brewery building in Ahäuser Weg.

=== Regular events ===
Weilburger Schlosskonzerte is an annual summer festival of mostly classical music held from 1972 at Schloss Weilburg, in the church or open air in the Renaissancehof (Renaissance court).

At the Freienfels castle ruins, five kilometres from Weilburg, the Freienfelser Ritterspiele (knightly games) are held yearly about 1 May. This "living history" event is well known countrywide.

The Weilburger Kirmes is known from historical records to have been kept since 1569. Many customs have been observed for a long time, such as the fair's Anschießen, the endowment of prizes for shooting, first awarded in 1746 by the town and later through prize endowments by the citizens. The fair's sponsor is the Weilburger Bürgergarde, a local club devoted to traditions and founded in 1813. Also now in this club's hands is the continued observance of the traditional Weilburg Church Fair (Weilburger Kirchweih).

=== Buildings ===
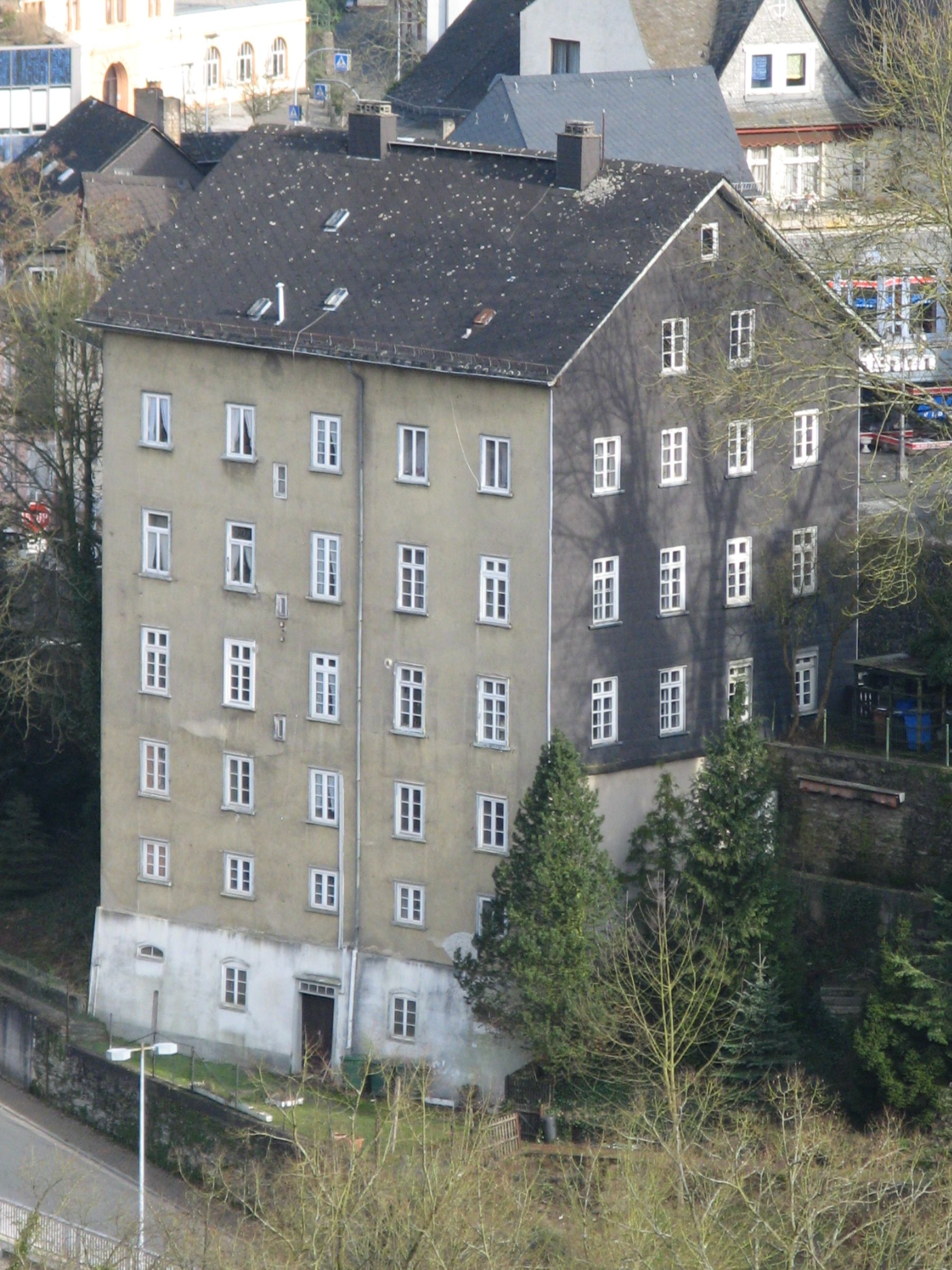
Germany's tallest loam building (built before 1836)

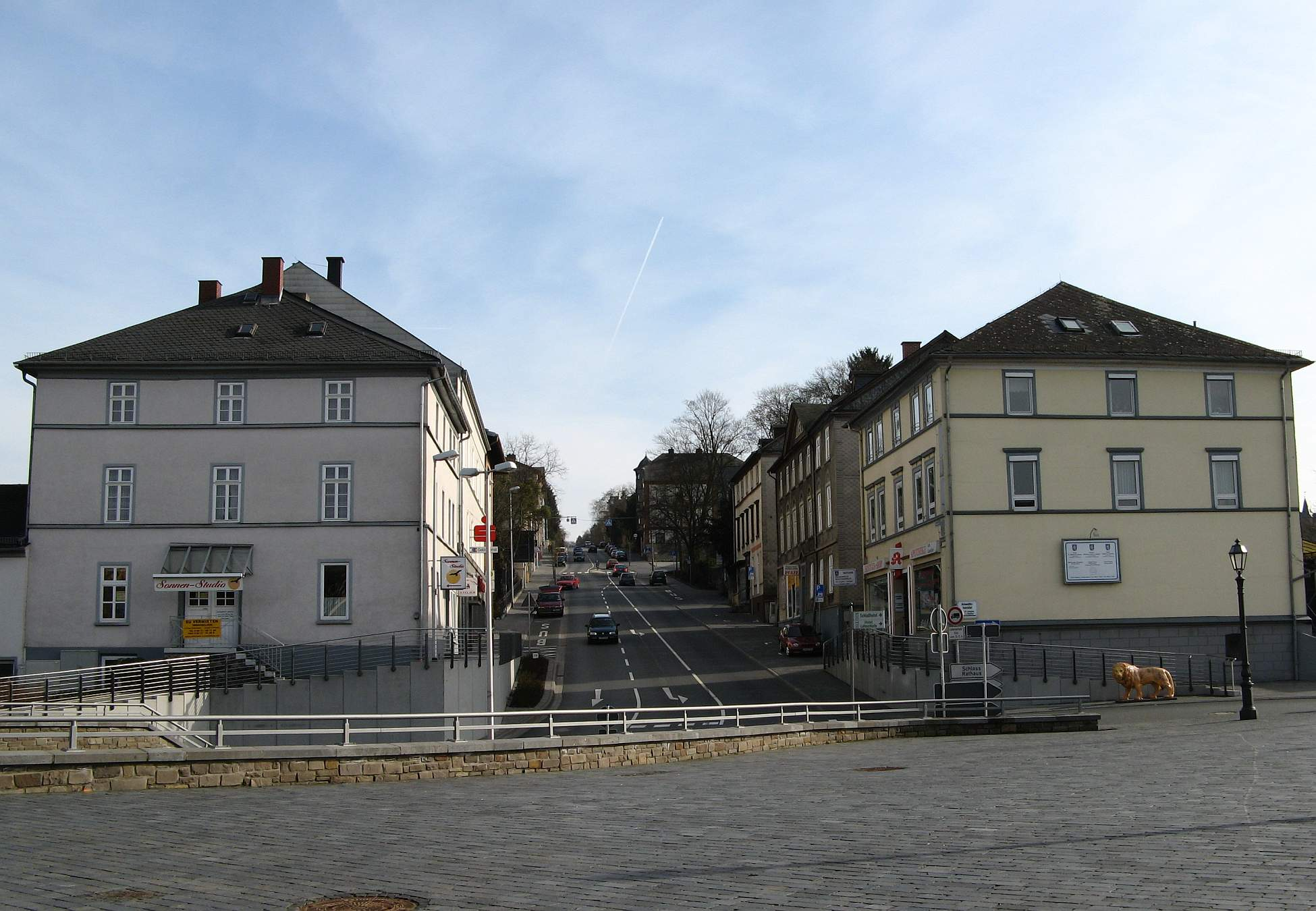
View from the Landtor (gate) to Frankfurter Straße

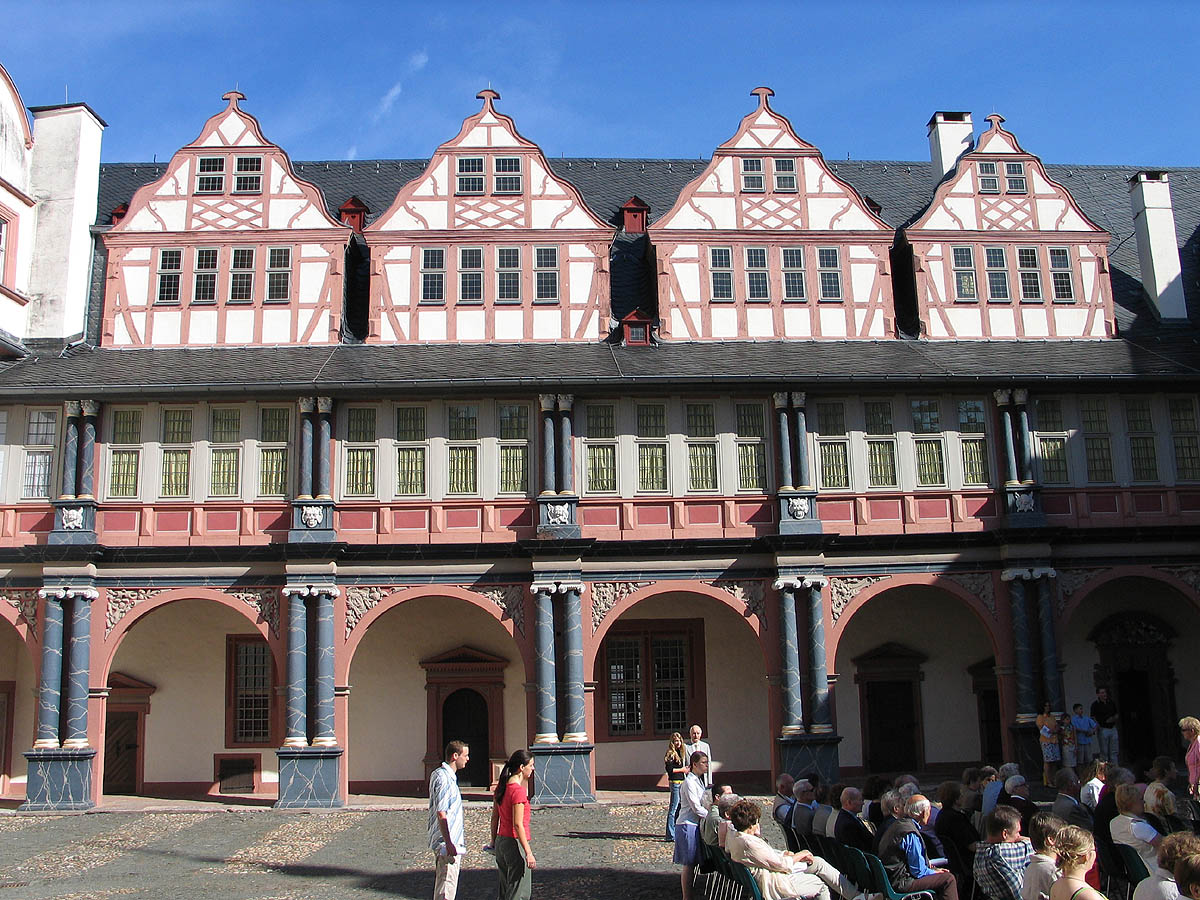
Schloss Weilburg, Renaissance court

Weilburg was for many years a residence town and governmental seat of the House of Nassau-Weilburg. Even today, the inner town is still characterized by buildings from that time. The most important building is Schloss Weilburg, dating back to the 14th century. It was converted in the 16th and 18th centuries. The Renaissance parts, known as the Kernschloss (main or central palace) is counted among the best preserved Renaissance palaces in Hesse. After the Baroque expansion under Johann-Ernst of Nassau-Weilburg, it takes in almost half of the Old Town, and including the Protestant Schlosskirche from the early 18th century.

Even the buildings on the marketplace with its Neptunbrunnen (a fountain from 1709) and those in the Old Town were built at the same time as the palace. However, there are also other timber-frame (i.e. half-timbered) houses from the 16th to 19th century.

In the Old Graveyard there is a Calvary Hill along with a Heilig-Grab-Kapelle ("Holy Sepulchre Chapel") oriented towards the Church of the Holy Sepulchre in Jerusalem.

For the Gymnasium Philippinum Weilburg, a representative building was built in the 18th century, which now houses the district and town library.

In the 19th century, the town grew noticeably beyond its mediaeval limits. On Limburger Straße, Bahnhofstraße and Frankfurter Straße, many loam buildings (or Pisee-Bauten, after the style's name, Pisee) were built. In particular, a row of façades in this style still stands on Bahnhofstraße. In Weilburg stands Germany's tallest building in the Pisee style.

It is said that the Weilburger Tunnelensemble, a set of three tunnels, is unique in the world. These three bores, set one beside the other each have a different function. One is a railway tunnel, another a highway tunnel and the third a waterway tunnel for shipping traffic. This last building work is unique in Germany. The newest tunnel in the set is the Mühlbergtunnel on the Weilburg bypass, opened to the public in 2004.

Weilburg's three tunnels

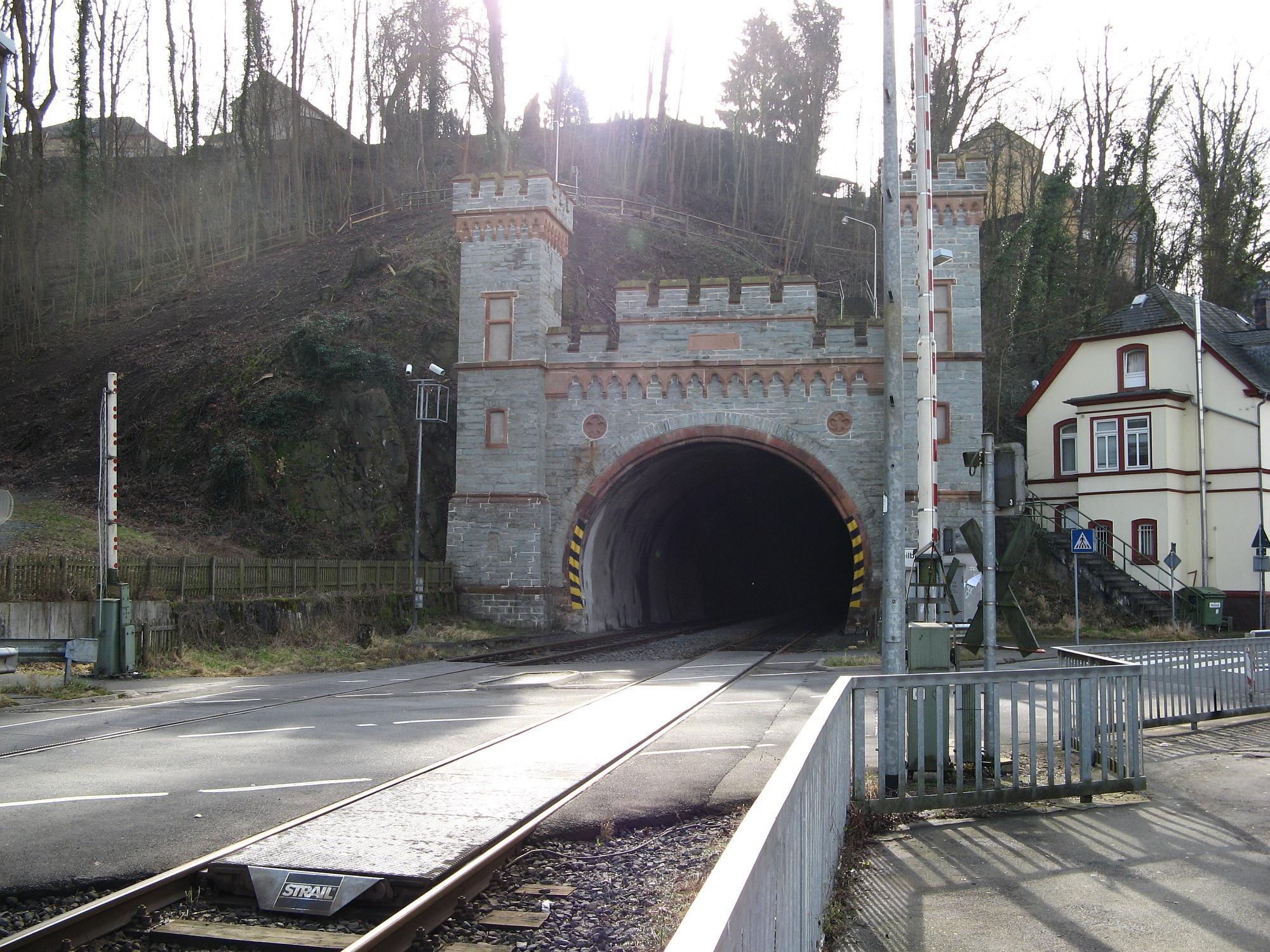
Railway tunnel

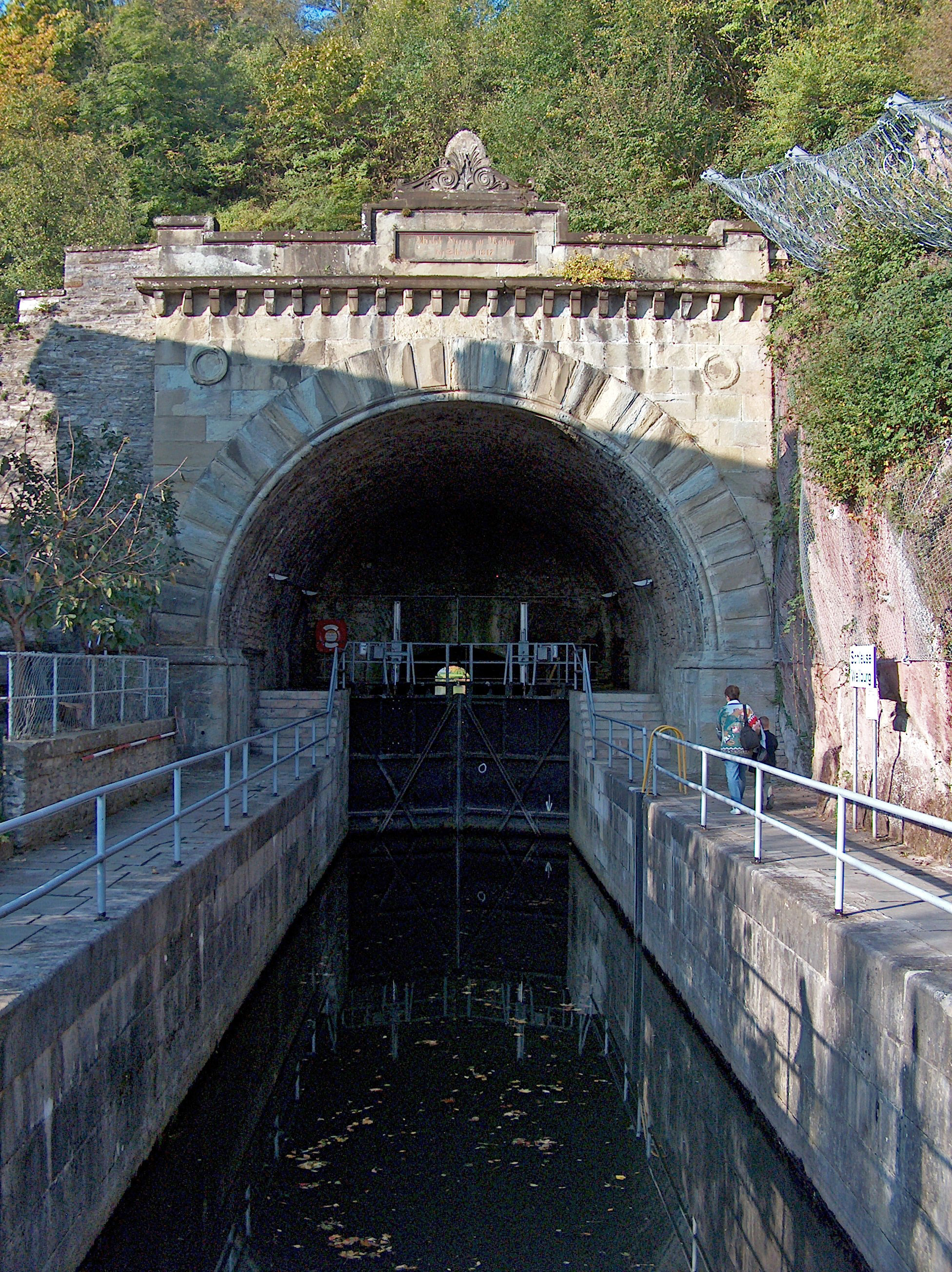
Shipping tunnel

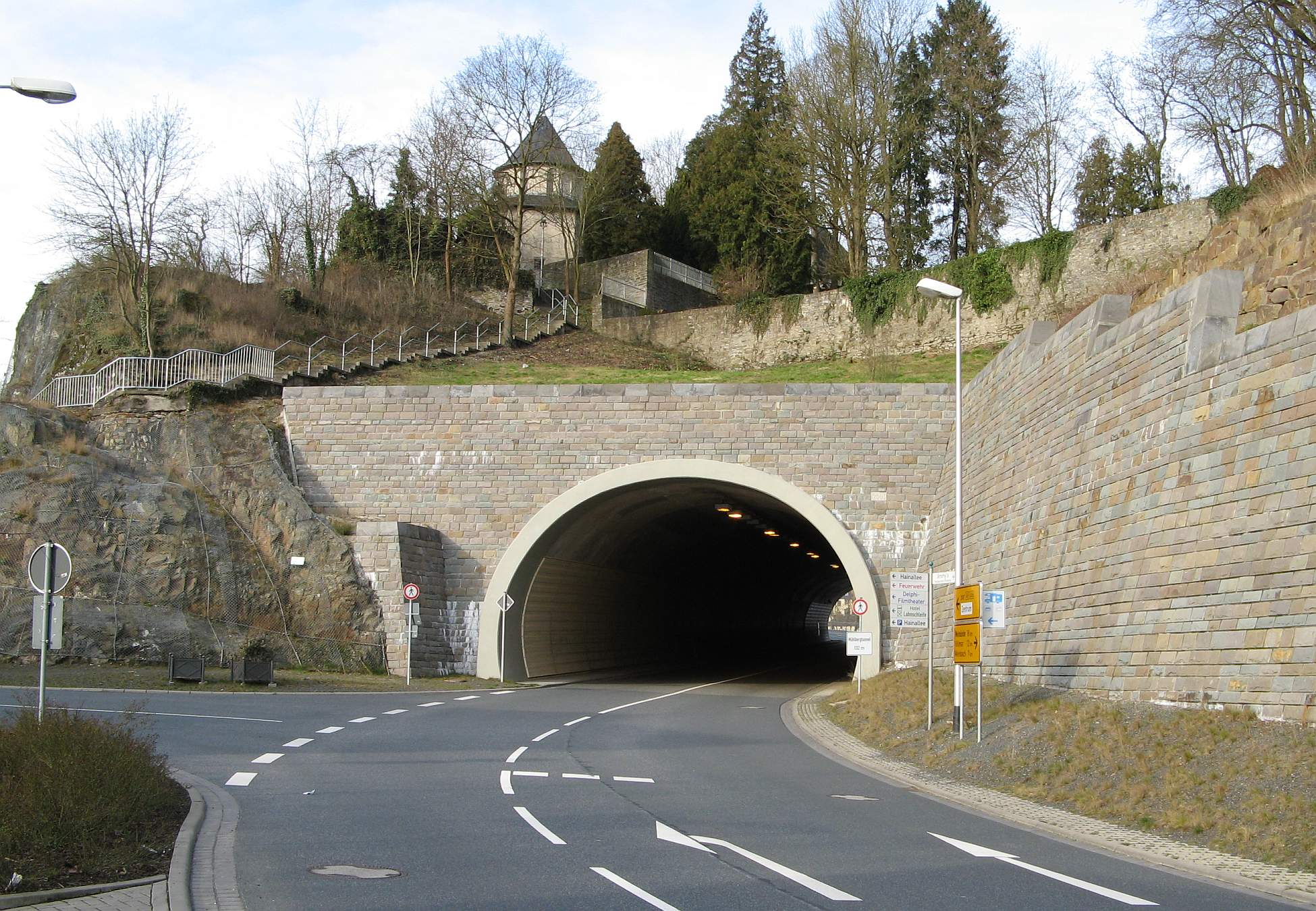
Road tunnel

Near the outlying centre of Drommershausen are found the ruins of the former monastery and Church of Our Dear Lady and St. John in Pfannstiel (a pilgrimage church), which figures in the history of the Order of Saint John. The monastery's and pilgrimage church's first documentary mention came in 1364. The monastery was put under the Nieder-Weisel commandry near Butzbach. In the course of the Reformation, the monastery was dissolved in the 16th century.

=== Parks ===
Schloss Weilburg has a Baroque garden that stretches over several terraces along the Lahn.

Furthermore, in the outlying centre of Hirschhausen lies the Tiergarten Weilburg. It was originally the Weilburg Counts' hunting ground, but today it is a zoological garden visited by 110,000 people every year.

=== Natural monuments ===
In the outlying centre of Kubach is found the Kristallhöhle, or Crystal Cave. Great parts of this cleft cave's walls are set with countless calcite crystals and calc-sinter. The crystals on the walls in this form are said to be unique in Germany. With a length of roughly 200 m, a breadth of up to 23 m and a height of up to 30 m the cave is believed to be Germany's biggest single natural underground chamber.

== Economy and infrastructure ==
=== Transport ===
The town lies on the Lahntal railway (serving Koblenz, Limburg, Weilburg, Wetzlar and Gießen) and belongs to the Rhein-Main-Verkehrsverbund. Until 1969, Weilburg was the terminus of the Weiltalbahn coming from Grävenwiesbach. For this line's needs a locomotive shed with a turntable was built at Weilburg's railway station. After the line was abandoned, the buildings were torn down in the 1980s. Even the former goods and marshalling station has been converted into three sidings and a passing loop.

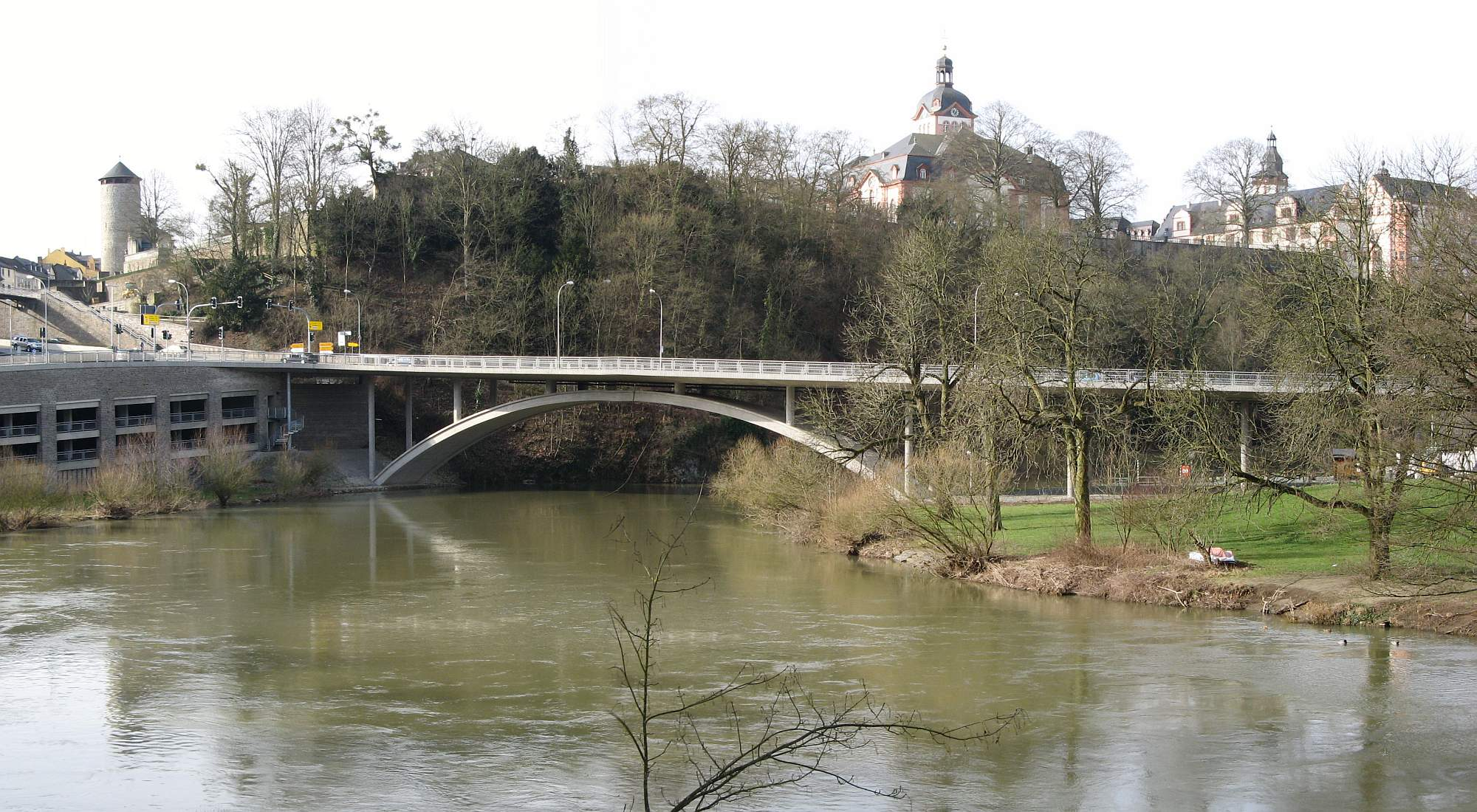
The Oberlahnbrücke in Weilburg

Weilburg can be reached by Bundesstraßen 49 and 456, which link it to Autobahnen A 3 (Cologne–Frankfurt) from Limburg and A 45 (Dortmund–Aschaffenburg) from Wetzlar, as well as from the Frankfurt Rhine Main Region.

Bundesstraße 456 crosses the Lahn in Weilburg over the Oberlahnbrücke ("Upper Lahn Bridge"). This was built as part of the Weilburg bypass. Also crossing the Lahn in Weilburg are the Steinerne Brücke ("Stone Bridge") and the Ahäuser Brücke ("Ahaus Bridge") for motorized traffic, and the Ernst-Dienstbach-Steg, a footbridge.

=== Established businesses ===
Weilburg is headquarters to Vistec Semiconductor Systems.

=== Education ===
Weilburg has a centuries-old tradition as a school town. As early as 1231, a Scholaster (monastic schoolmaster) is mentioned and in 1360 the monastery school itself. The school's successor was the Evangelical school founded on 15 October 1540 by Count Philipp III of Nassau-Weilburg. Weilburg's oldest school, the Gymnasium Philippinum, grew out of this forerunner school.

On schooldays, Weilburg's educational institutions are attended by more than 8,000 young learners.

The following schools are to be found today in Weilburg:

- Christian-Spielmann-Schule (primary school); for pupils from parts of the municipal area on the Taunus side and the constituent communities of Bermbach, Hirschhausen, Kirschhofen and Kubach; named after the historian Christian Spielmann.
- Pestalozzischule (primary school); for pupils from parts of the municipal area on the Westerwald side and the constituent communities of Gaudernbach, Hasselbach, Odersbach and Waldhausen.
- Heinrich-von-Gagern-Schule (Hauptschule and Realschule); for pupils from Limburg-Weilburg and the Lahn-Dill-Kreis.
- Jakob-Mankel-Schule (integrated comprehensive school since 1994, and until 2008 the only one in the district); offers the Hauptschule, Realschule and Gymnasium streams in integrated form up to the 10th class.
- Gymnasium Philippinum (Gymnasium); is the oldest school in Weilburg and is attended by pupils from places in the former Oberlahnkreis and from the Lahn-Dill-Kreis.
- Walderbachschule (school for practically teachable pupils); is a special school with the goal of helping pupils, independently of their individual handicaps, attain the greatest possible satisfaction from their lives.
- Windhofschule (school for children with learning difficulties and those with physical handicaps); is a special school and a special paedagogical counselling and advocacy centre. The Windhofschule offers handicapped pupils the opportunity of a school life participating together with able-bodied pupils.
- Wilhelm-Knapp-Schule (vocational schooling centre); unites ten kinds of school in the field of vocational schooling, among them the branches of the vocational Gymnasium, the Fachoberschule (technical college) and the Higher Trade School.
- Staatliche Technikerschule Weilburg ("State Technician School")
- Amt für Lehrerbildung ("Office for Teacher Training")
- Hessisches Forstliches Bildungszentrum (FBZ, "Hessian Forestry Education Centre)
- Dachdeckerzentrum Hessen ("Hesse Roofer Centre")
- Kreisvolkshochschule Limburg-Weilburg e.V. (district folk high school)
- Weilburger Musikschule

== Famous people ==
=== Honorary citizens ===
Note: The listing is chronological by date of conferral.

1. Wilhelm Farr (born 8 July 1833 in Freiensen; died 10 February 1907 in Weilburg)
  businessman, politician, mayor
  honoured 1903
  Farr was a successful businessman in Weilburg. After stints on town council from 1870 and for three years in the Prussian assembly from 1876, he was elected mayor in 1885. He held the office until 1888 and bequeathed the town on his death a great sum for non-commercial purposes.
2. Gustav Karthaus (born 21 March 1859 in Grumbach; died 8 February 1934 in Weilburg)
  administrative official, mayor
  honoured 1927
  After Karthaus had already served four and a half years in Melsungen as mayor, he then reached the top job in the town of Weilburg on 1 October 1905. During his 21 years in office he more than anything else set himself the task of improving infrastructure. The waterworks were modernized, and with the building of a power station, so was the electrical system. In 1913, the new barracks were built. He had many of the town's streets developed and introduced town expansion with building areas on the Zeppenfeld and the Karlsberg. He moreover dedicated himself to dealing with the town's social problems by supporting its relief organizations. On the occasion of his retirement on 31 December 1926, he was made an honorary citizen.
3. Friedrich Brinkmann (born 25 August 1877 in Weilburg; died 26 July 1960 in Weilburg)
  butchery master
  honoured 1953
  Brinkmann had taken over his father's estate butcher's shop in the upper Langgasse in 1900. At this time, he began to involve himself in a whole series of honorary offices, serving as honorary chief master (Ehrenobermeister) of the butchers' guild, former master of the Wiesbaden crafts chamber and honorary member of the Weilburg volunteer fire brigade. From 1902 until his death he was a captain of the Weilburg Bürgergarde, one of Nassau's oldest tradition clubs.

Source: Magistrat der Stadt Weilburg (Hg.): Weilburg-Lexikon. Weilburg 2006

Paul von Hindenburg, Adolf Hitler, Hermann Göring, Jakob Sprenger and Prince Philipp of Hesse (Chief President of the province of Hesse-Nassau) were all stripped of their civic honours in 1946 by order of the town council.

=== Others ===
- Conrad I, the Younger (died 23 December 918 in Weilburg; buried in Fulda), was from 906 Duke of Franconia and from 911 to 918 King of East Francia.
- Friedrich Ludwig von Sckell (born 13 September 1750 in Weilburg) one of the most important garden designers, founder of the "classical phase" of the landscaped English garden in Germany.
- Wilhelm Jacob Wimpf (born 15 November 1767 in Weilburg, died 11 April 1839 in Weilburg), entrepreneur and pioneer of loam building
- Carl Boos (born 8 September 1806); architect; built, among other things, the Marktkirche ("Market Church") in Wiesbaden
- Heinrich von Gagern (born 1798 in Bayreuth, died 22 May 1880 in Darmstadt), grew up in Weilburg and did his Abitur at the Gymnasium Philippinum in town, 1848 President of the Frankfurt Parliament.
- Gert Fritz Unger (died 3 August 2005 in Weilburg), writer and western author
- Ulrike Meinhof came to Weilburg in 1952, where she attended the Gymnasium Philippinum up to her Abitur in 1955.
- Heinrich Heinlein (born 3 December 1803 in Weilburg), painter
- Erwin Schmidt (born 20 July 1886 in Weilburg; died 31 August 1956 in Weilburg), Heimatforscher ("homeland researcher")
- Richard Hoin (born 23 July 1879 in Odersbach; died 14 October 1944 in Odersbach), politician and resistance fighter
- Willy Heigl (born 25 March 1904 in Dillenburg; died 15 March 1973), first democratic mayor of Weilburg after the Third Reich
- Thomas Valentin (born 13 January 1922 in Weilburg; died 22 November 1980 in Lippstadt), writer
