= Laubuseschbach =

- Village of Weilmünster
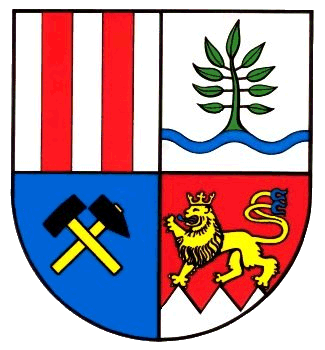
- Coat of arms
- Interactive map of Laubuseschbach
- Location within Germany Location within Hesse
- Coordinates: 50°23′41″N 8°20′3″E
- Country: Germany
- State: Hesse
- City: Weilmünster

Area
  - Total: 7.73 km^{2} (2.98 sq mi)

Population (2021-06-30)
  - Total: 1,414
  - Density: 183/km^{2} (474/sq mi)
- Time zone: UTC+01:00 (CET)
  - Summer (DST): UTC+02:00 (CEST)
- Postal codes: 35789
- Dialling codes: 06475
- Vehicle registration: LM

Laubuseschbach is a village (Ortsteil) of the municipality of Weilmünster in the district of Limburg-Weilburg in central Hesse. It has around 1400 inhabitants (2021).

== Geography ==
Laubuseschbach is located in the eastern Hintertaunus in the Taunus Nature Park. The highest elevations near Laubuseschbach are the Alteberg at 370 metres above sea level, the Hühnerküppel at 369 metres above sea level and the Hasenberg at 358 metres above sea level. The Bleidenbach stream flows through the village.

The district covers an area of 7.73 square kilometres, of which 2.09 square kilometres are forest.

Neighbouring villages are Wolfenhausen (south-west), Blessenbach (north-west), Rohnstadt (north-east) and Langenbach (east). The nearest larger towns are Weilburg (16 km) to the north-west, Limburg (25 km) to the west, Wetzlar (27 km) to the north-east and Frankfurt am Main (50 km) to the south-east.

== History ==
In surviving documents, Laubuseschbach was mentioned under the following place names (year of mention in brackets): Ascabach (897), Ascobach (912), Ascabah (1107), Essebach (1334), Esbach (1457), Essbach (1496), Eschpach (1513), Espach (1537), Eschbach (1802) and Laubuseschbach (1824).

In 893, the Carolingian king Arnulf donated parts of his possessions to the monastery of St Maximin in Trier. When four years later, in 897, his son Zwentibold confirmed this gift, Ascapahc (Eschbach) was also mentioned in a detailed list. The deed of donation is now kept in the National Museum in Paris. The monastery of St Maximin appoints the Lords of Molsberg as bailiffs in Eschbach. In the first half of the 12th century, they succeeded in incorporating Eschbach into their dominion. At the beginning of the 14th century, the lords of Molsberg made the knights of Elkerhausen fief holders of Eschbach. In 1323 the village was sold to Elkerhausen. From 4 July 1390, the Archbishop of Trier was the feudal lord of the manor of Eschbach. In 1421, Hermann von Haiger, Heilwig von Schönborn and Bernhard von Mudersbach were enfeoffed with Eschbach as heirs of the Elkerhausen knights.

Laubuseschbach (Eschbach Castle) is known as the birthplace of Johann Philipp von Schönborn, one of the most important archbishops of Mainz. At that time, Laubuseschbach was still called Eschbach. When the nearby village of Laubus was completely devastated during the Thirty Years' War, the survivors moved to Eschbach. The village was therefore renamed Laubus-Eschbach in 1824 and later Laubuseschbach.

In order to better transport the rich raw material deposits in the remote region, the Weilmünster-Laubuseschbach railway line went into operation on 15 May 1892, connecting to the existing Weiltalbahn. A planned continuation of the line through the Laubus valley via Wolfenhausen to the Main-Lahn railway fell victim to the First World War and its effects on the subsequent decline in mining. After the 1955 winter, passenger transport to Laubuseschbach was discontinued, followed by freight transport in 1968. The line was shut down and later dismantled.

In the course of the territorial reform in Hesse, on 31 December 1970 the former market town of Weilmünster in the Oberlahn district merged voluntarily with the previously independent municipalities of Aulenhausen, Dietenhausen, Ernsthausen, Laimbach, Langenbach, Laubuseschbach, Lützendorf, Möttau, Rohnstadt and Wolfenhausen to form the new enlarged municipality of Weilmünster. Essershausen was added on 31 December 1971. Own districts were established for the former municipalities, and they are still represented politically with an own Ortsbeirat and Ortsvorsteher within the larger municipality.

== Demographics ==
According to the 2011 census, there were 1542 inhabitants living in Laubuseschbach on 9 May 2011. Of these, 54 (3.5%) were foreigners. In terms of age, 282 residents were under 18 years old, 612 between 18 and 49, 315 between 50 and 64 and 333 residents were older. The residents lived in 654 households.

Year	Population
1825	581
1834	699
1871	937
1905	995
1946	1,356
1970	1,370
2011	1,542
2021	1,414

== Sights ==
The following sights in Laubuseschbach are cultural landmarks:

- Gravestones in the side walls of the cemetery chapel
- Former town hall
- Memorial of 1870/71
- Protestant church Laubuseschbach
- Schönbornscher Hof
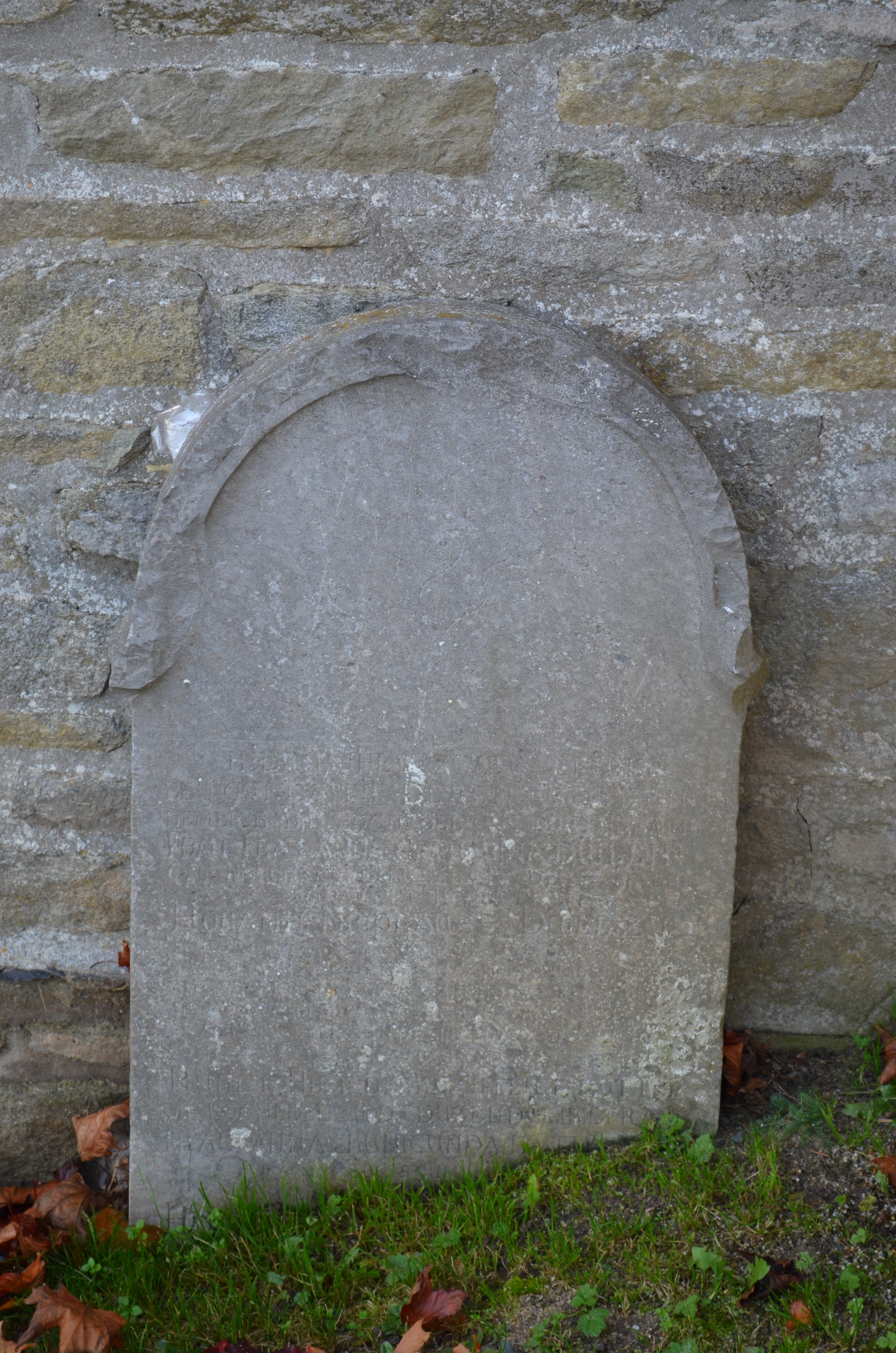
Gravestones on the cemetery

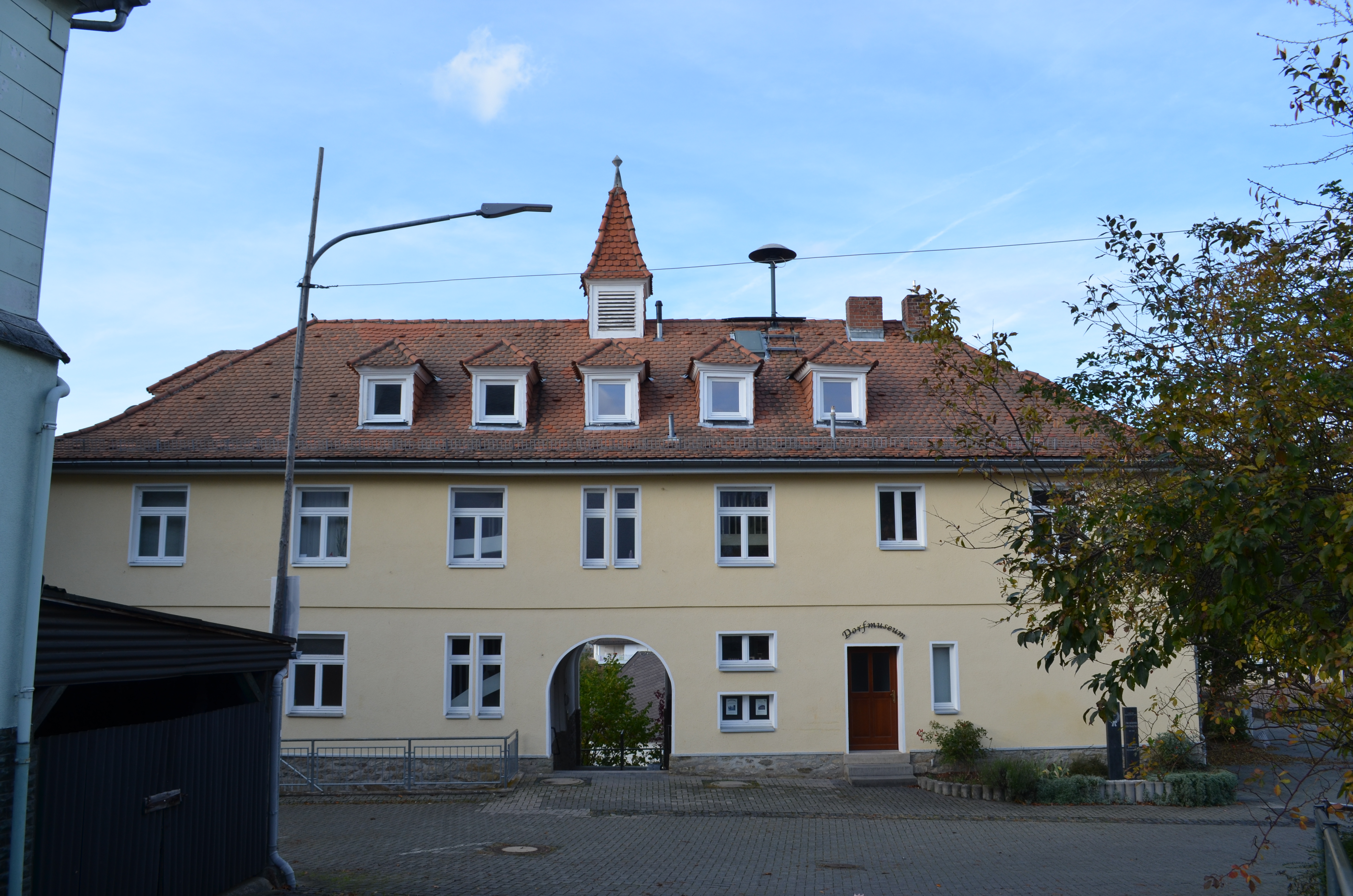
Former town hall

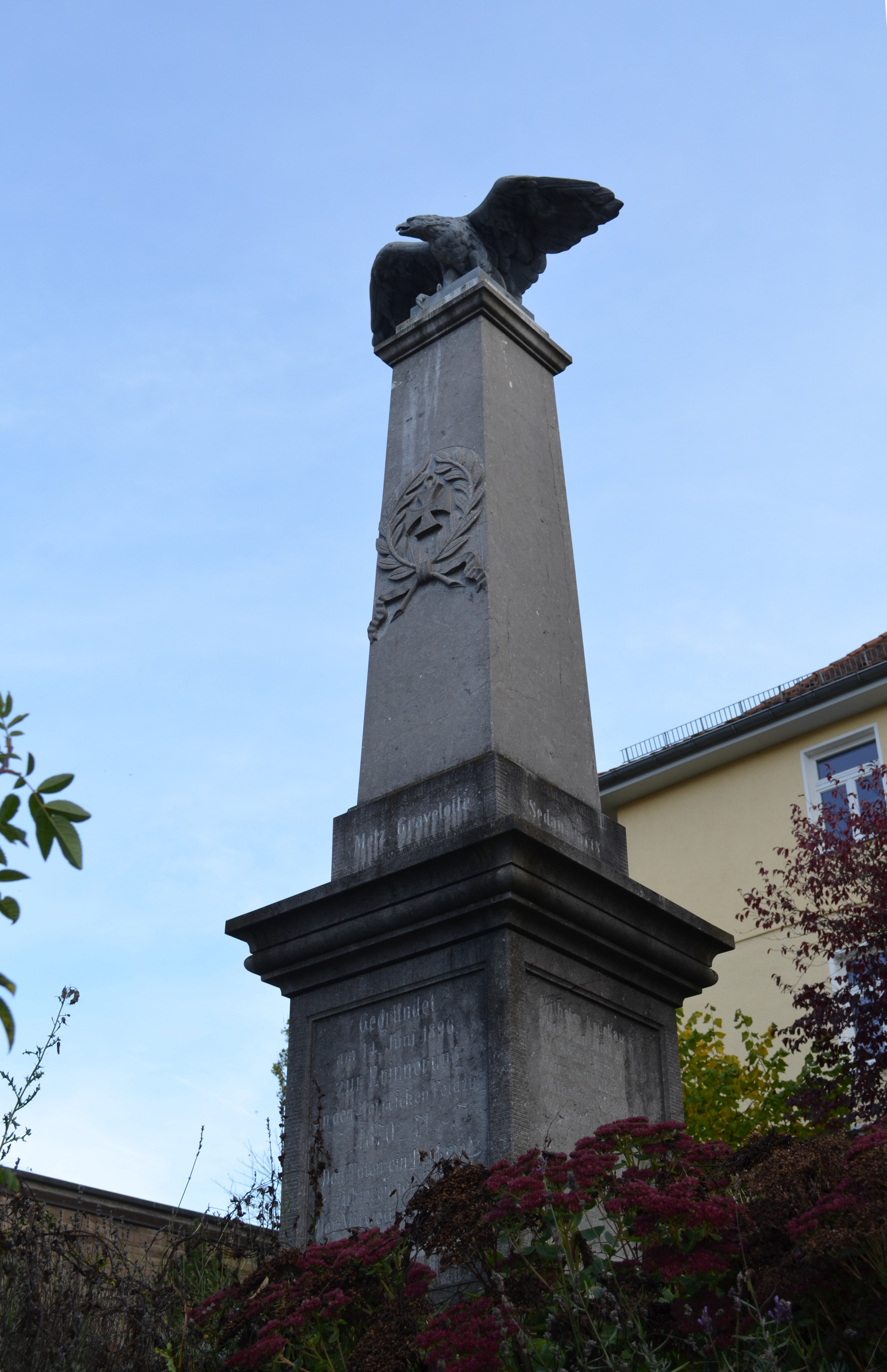
Memorial of 1870/71

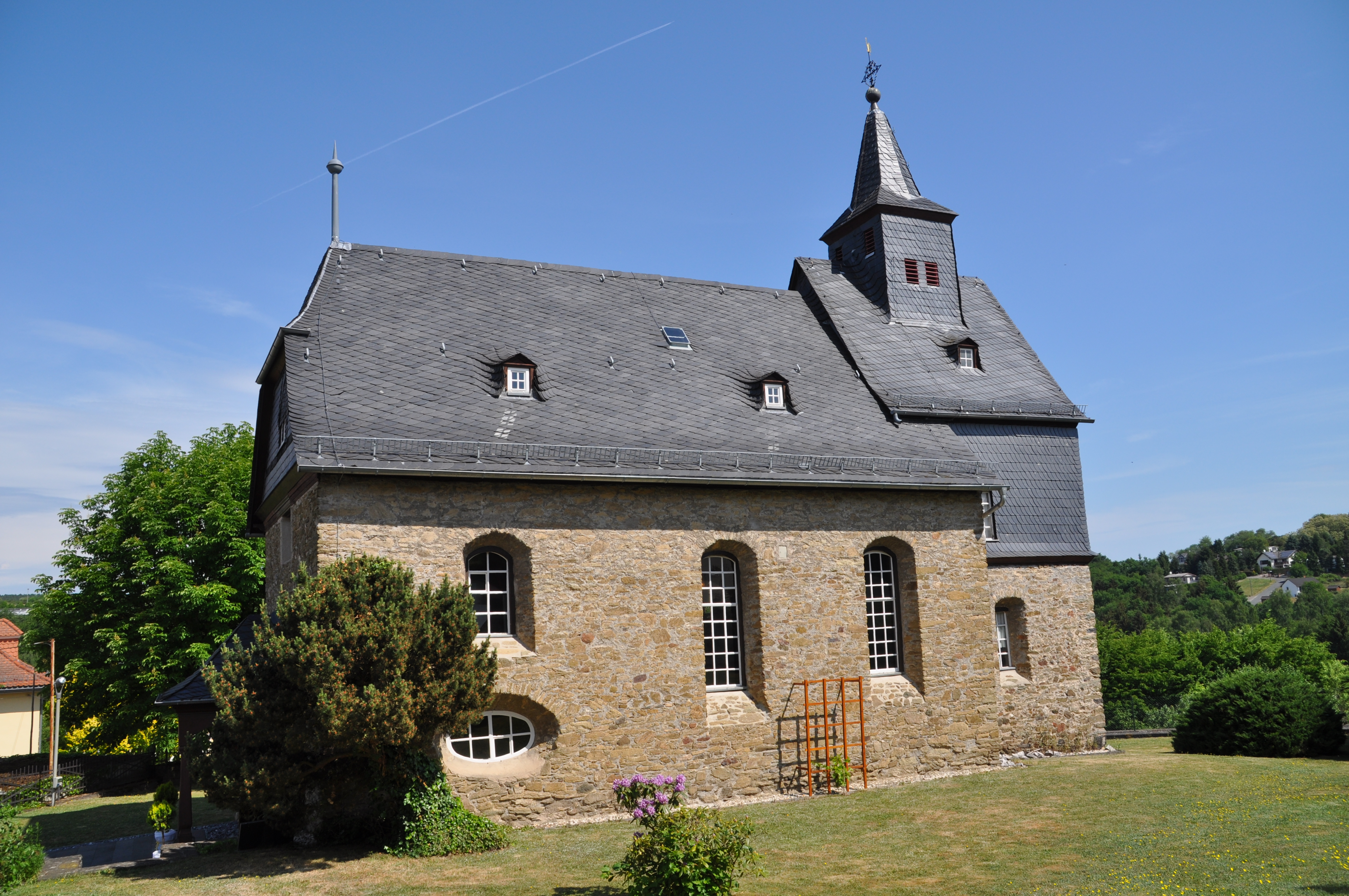
Protestant church Laubuseschbach

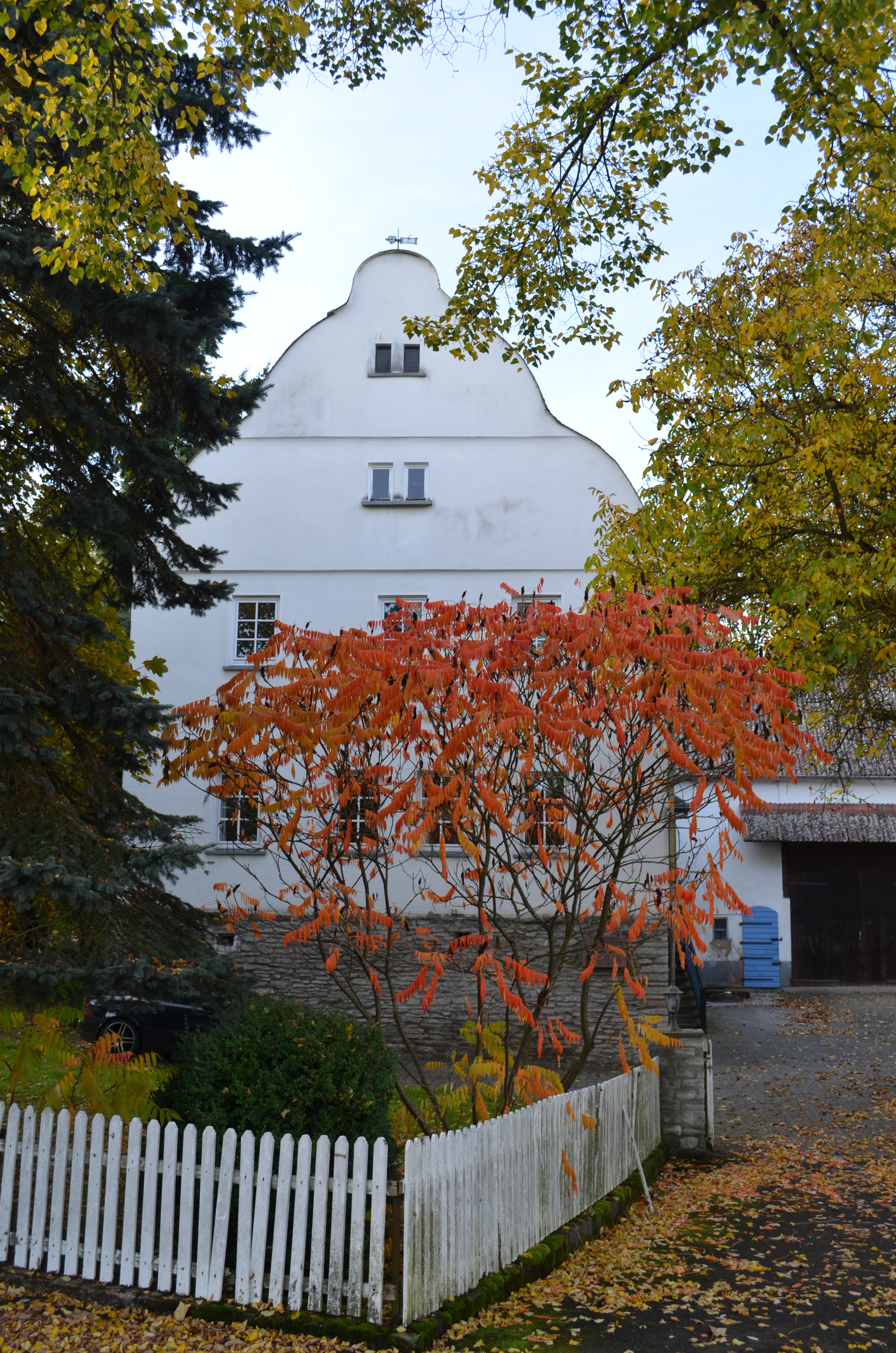
Schönbornscher Hof

== Culture ==
Near the Alteberg, the Frohsinn-Eintracht Laubuseschbach choir and musical community has been organising the traditional Äbbelwoifest (apple wine festival) on Ascension Day (Father's Day) since 1998. Located in the forest, the festival attracts several thousand visitors from near and far every year.

There is the village community centre in Kirchgasse, the MGV "Harmonie" club hall, the village museum in the former town hall, two sports fields and the motocross area on Talberg, children's playgrounds as well as cycling and hiking trails and different cultural associations. The Laubuseschbach volunteer fire brigade (Freiwillige Feuerwehr Laubuseschbach) provides fire protection in the village.
