= Wolfenhausen =

- Village of Weilmünster
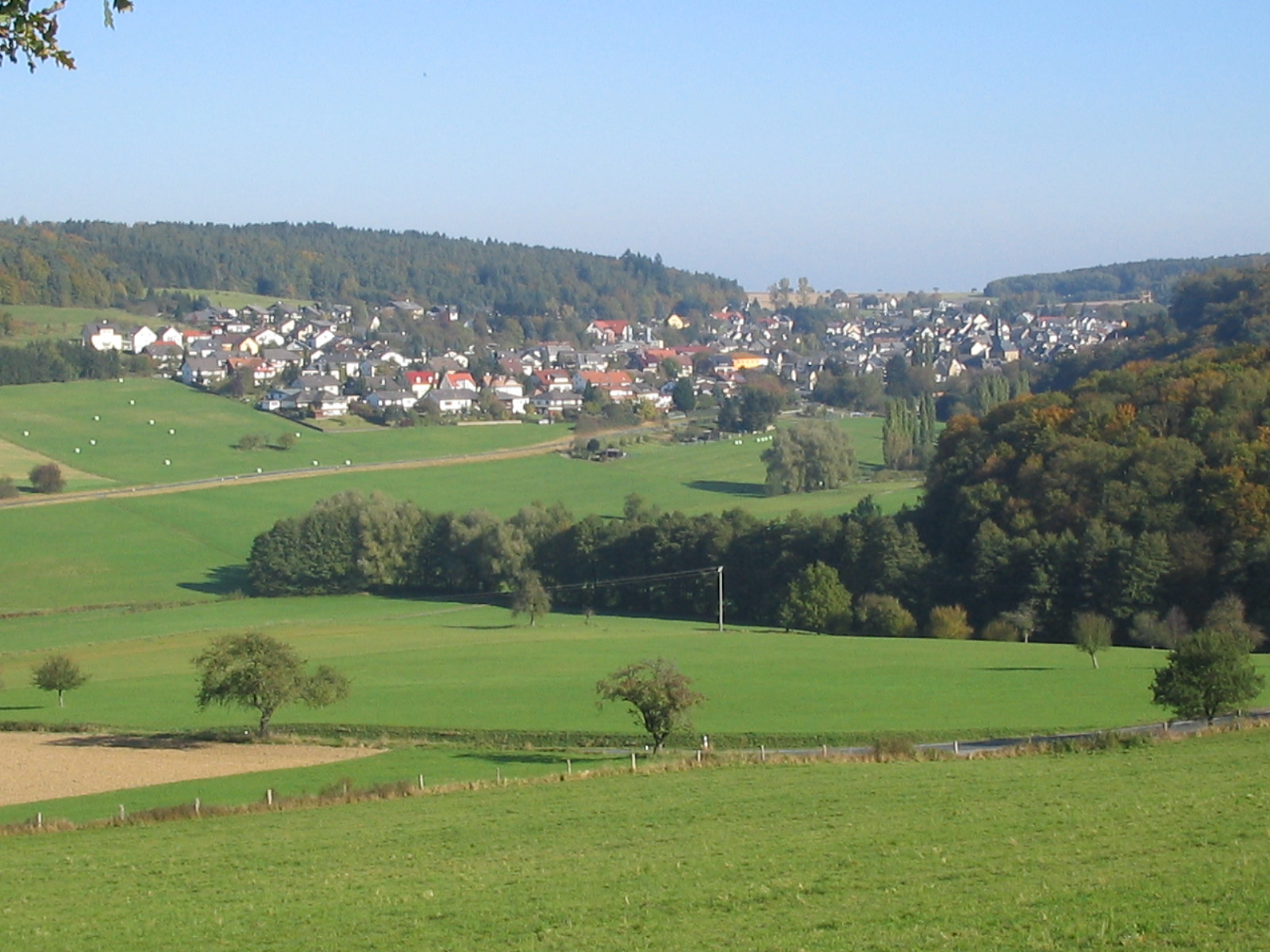
- Wolfenhausen with landscape
- Interactive map of Wolfenhausen
- Location within Germany Location within Hesse
- Coordinates: 50°22′51″N 8°19′1″E
- Country: Germany
- State: Hesse
- City: Weilmünster

Area
  - Total: 5.53 km^{2} (2.14 sq mi)

Population (2021-06-30)
  - Total: 1,044
  - Density: 189/km^{2} (489/sq mi)
- Time zone: UTC+01:00 (CET)
  - Summer (DST): UTC+02:00 (CEST)
- Postal codes: 35789
- Dialling codes: 06475
- Vehicle registration: LM

Wolfenhausen is a village (Ortsteil) of the municipality of Weilmünster in the district of Limburg-Weilburg in central Hesse. It has around 1000 inhabitants (2021).

== Geography ==
Wolfenhausen is located in the eastern Hintertaunus in the Taunus Nature Park, at an altitude of 300 metres above sea level, approx. seven kilometres south-west of the core municipality of Weilmünster. The highest elevation in the district is the Rote Küppel at 378 metres. The Wolfenhauserbach stream flows through the village. It rises in the Laubus forest district, flows down the valley through the Laubus valley and is called Laubusbach below the village. The district area is 5.54 square kilometres, of which 1.96 square kilometres are forest.

Neighbouring villages are Münster (to the west), Langhecke (to the north-west), Laubuseschbach (to the north-east) and Haintchen (to the south).

== History ==
The village was first mentioned in a document from 1194 as belonging to the parish of Münster. It is assumed that the village already existed several centuries earlier. Wolfenhausen was mentioned in surviving documents under the following place names (the year of mention in brackets): Wolvenhusen (1194), Wolfhusen (1197), Wolfenhusen (1397) and Wolfenhuessen (1438), Wolffhyssen (1532), Wolffhausen (1554), Wolffenhausen (1607) and Wolffenhaussen (1661). Emperor Otto I donated Wolfenhausen to the diocese of Worms around the year 1000. The beginning of serfdom for the citizens of Wolfenhausen is also said to have started at this time. A document dated 14 November 1570 reports on an exchange of serfs in Wolfenhausen between the County of Wied-Runkel and Nassau-Saarbrücken. While the village belonged to the church of Arnstein Abbey near Nassau from 1194 to around 1400, the inhabitants of Wolfenhausen were partly subject to the Count of Nassau and the Count of Wied-Runkel and subject to tribute. From 1596, the Imperial Counts of Wied-Runkel appear to have been undisputed lords.

The Thirty Years' War had a devastating impact on Wolfenhausen, as it did on the neighbouring villages in the Hintertaunus region. However, the village was spared complete destruction. Wolfenhausen had probably been Protestant since 1551 and belonged to the Reformed confession, like the Princes of Wied-Runkel. By government decree of the Count of Wied-Runkel in 1691, Wolfenhausen was separated from the mother church of Münster and elevated to a parish. In 1752, the old, dilapidated chapel was demolished and a new church was built, and a new organ was purchased in 1780. The churchyard was relocated in 1823 to the east outside Wolfenhausen.

The town has had the privilege of holding markets since 1707. The marketplace was located on the site of today's sports field. The inhabitants of Wolfenhausen have always been farmers, miners and simple craftsmen. According to historic sources, broom making was an important cottage industry in the 19th century.

In 1766, 42 inhabitants of Wolfenhausen left their birthplace and immigrated to the Russian Empire. The reason for their emigration may have been inflation and famine as well as the temporary reduction in land ownership. On 31 May 1802, the famous robber Johannes Bückler, also known as Schinderhannes, was captured in the Wolfenhausen district on the border with the district of Haintchen.

In the course of the territorial reform in Hesse, on 31 December 1970 the former market town of Weilmünster in the Oberlahn district merged voluntarily with the previously independent municipalities of Aulenhausen, Dietenhausen, Ernsthausen, Laimbach, Langenbach, Laubuseschbach, Lützendorf, Möttau, Rohnstadt and Wolfenhausen to form the new enlarged municipality of Weilmünster. Essershausen was added on 31 December 1971. Own districts were established for the former municipalities, and they are still represented politically with an own Ortsbeirat and Ortsvorsteher within the larger municipality.

== Demographics ==
According to the 2011 census, there were 1,137 inhabitants living in Wolfenhausen on 9 May 2011. Of these, 72 (6.3%) were foreigners.

Year	Population
1825	555
1834	601
1871	832
1905	915
1946	1,025
1970	1,024
2011	1,137
2021	1,044

== Sights ==
- Church of Wolfenhausen
- Old school
- Multiple old houses
- Old wells
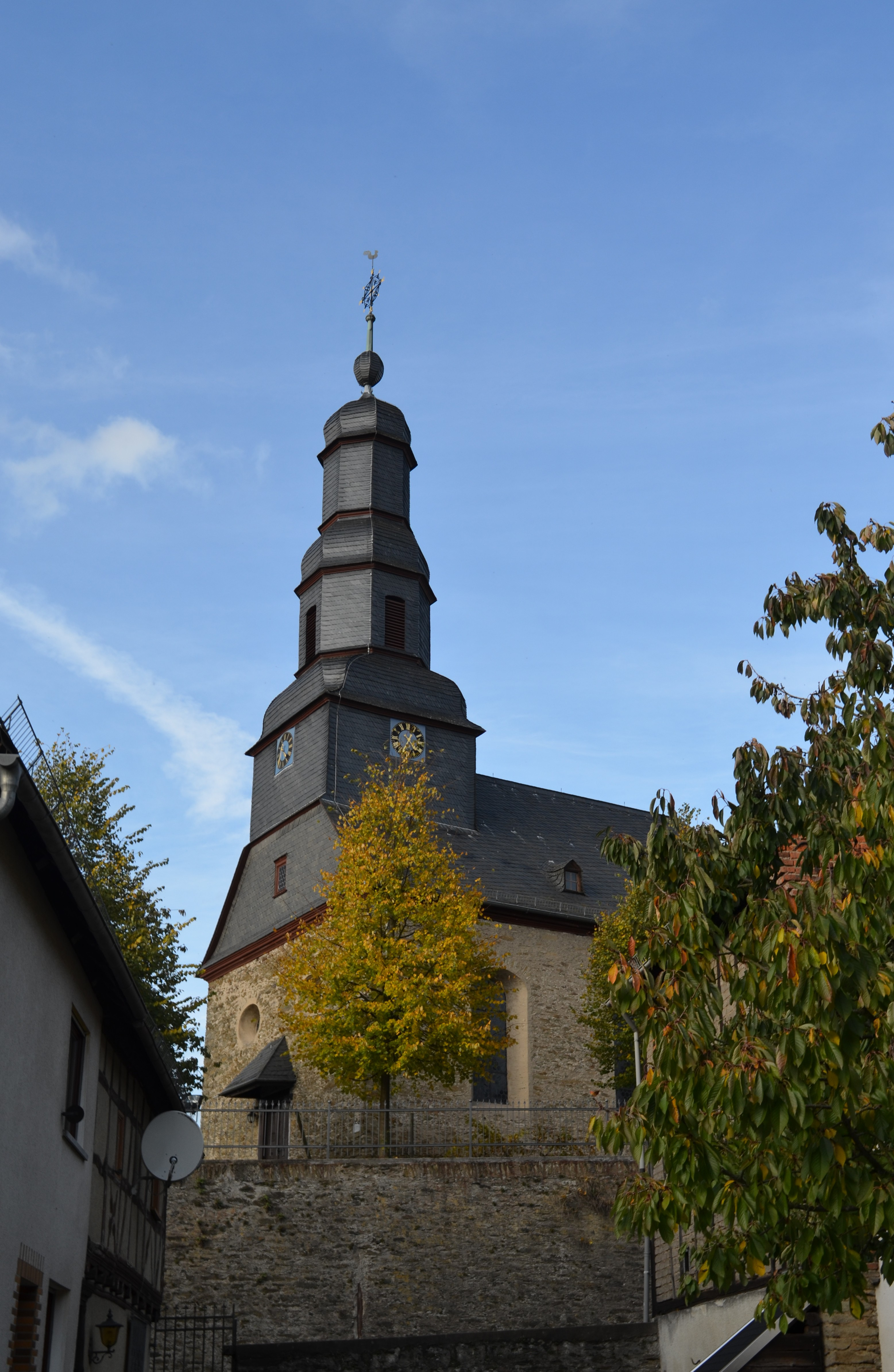
Protestant church Wolfenhausen

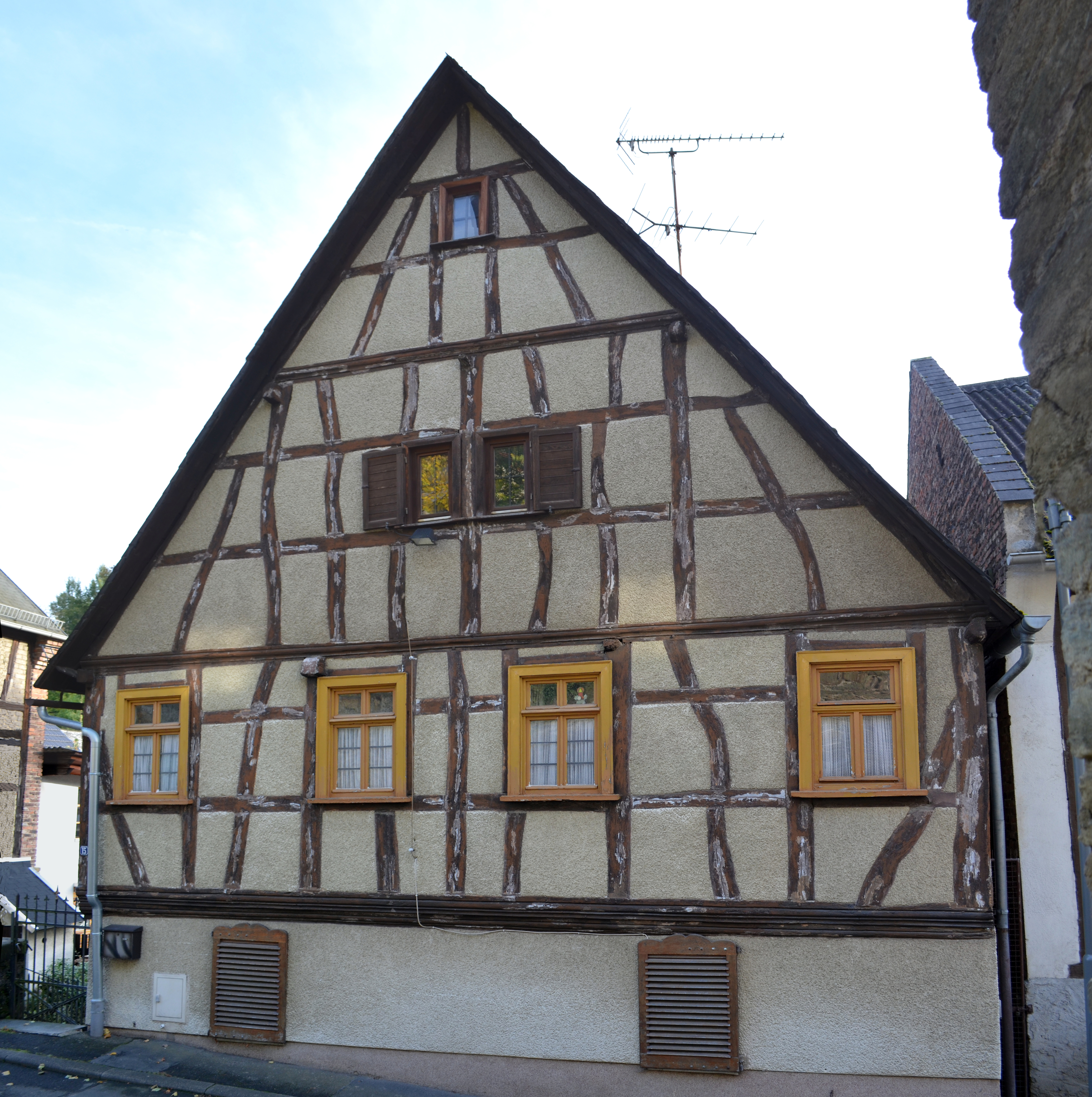
Old school

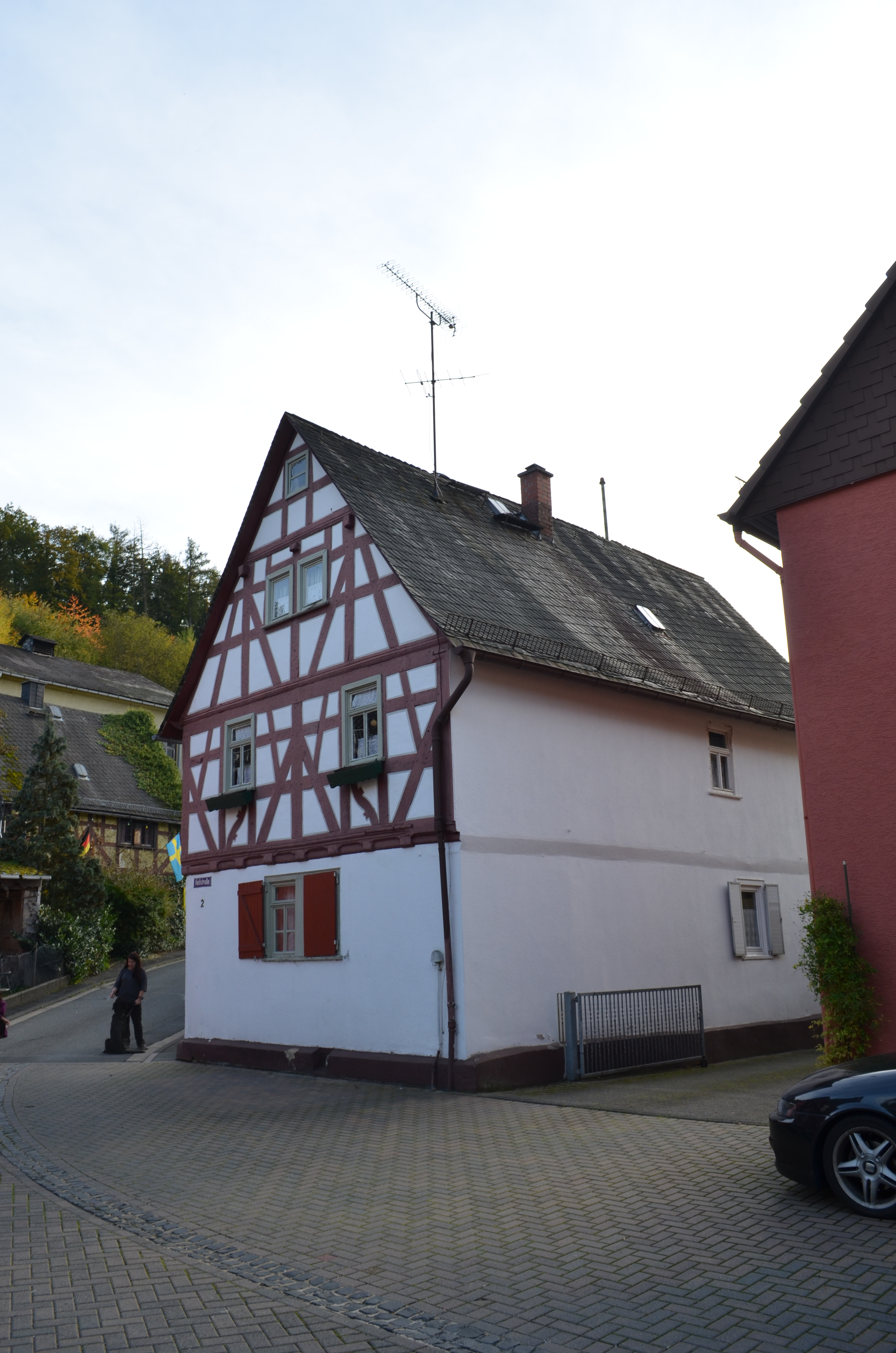
Old house

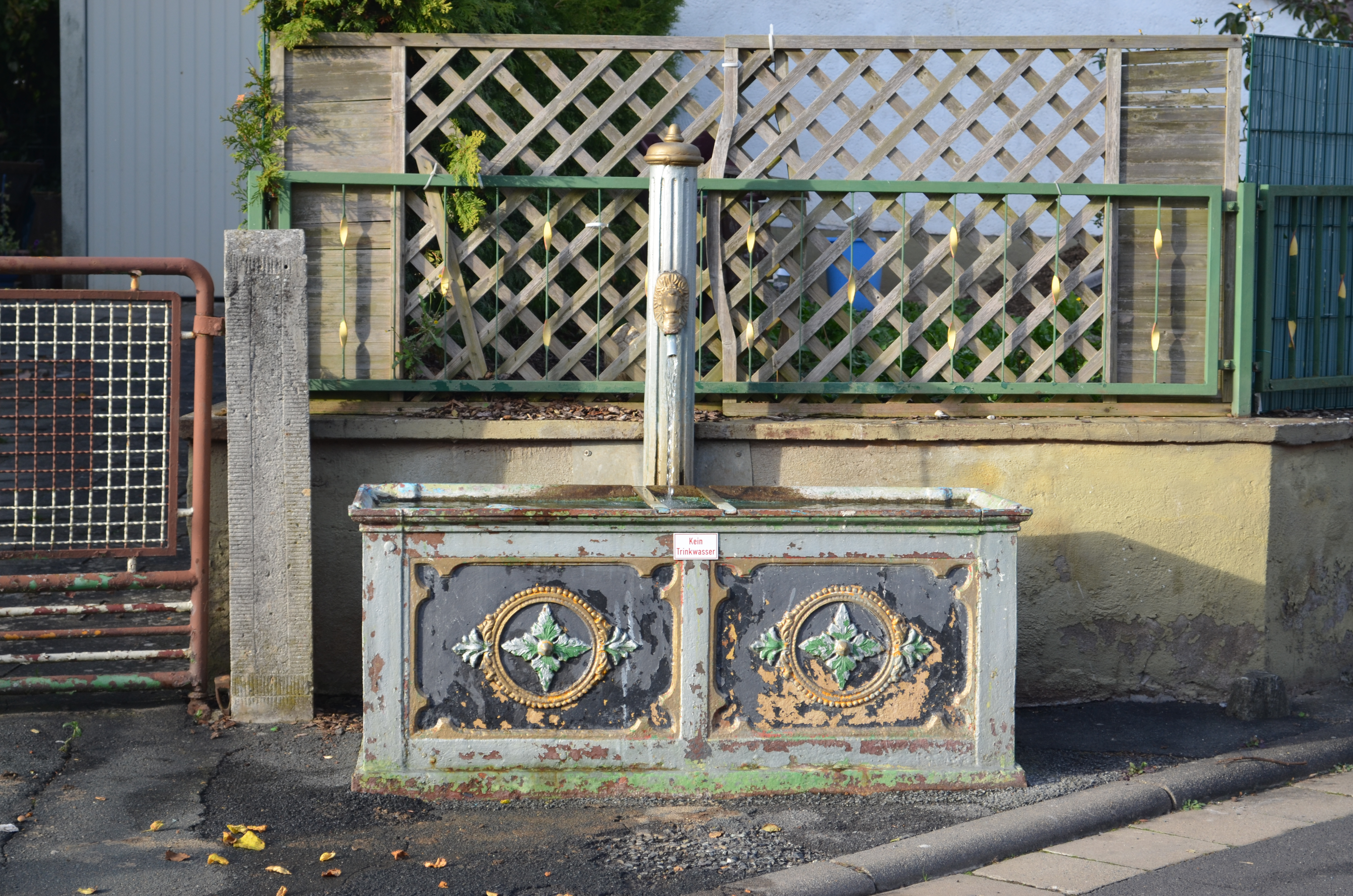
Old well
