= Kirbergturm =

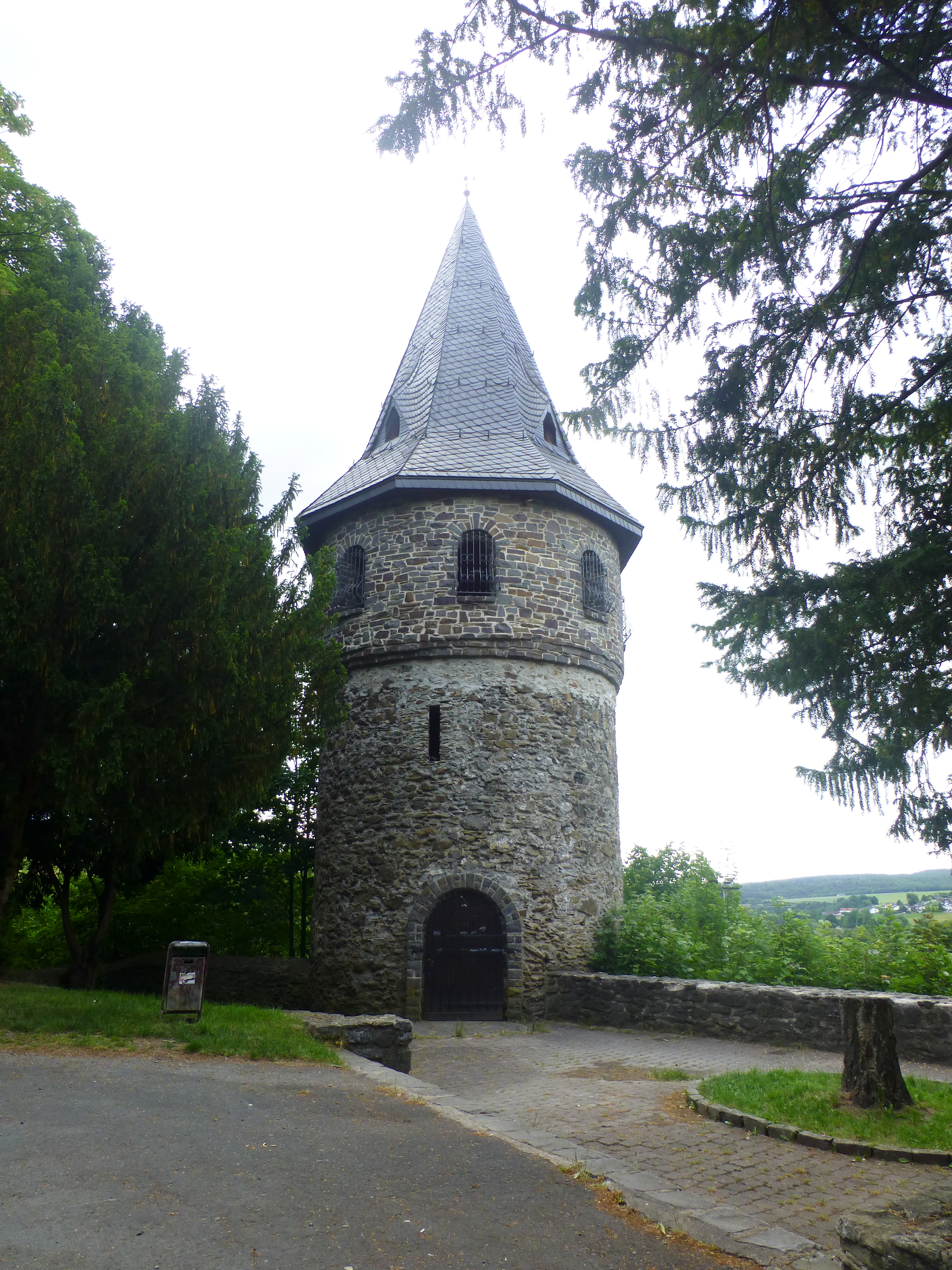
- View of the building
- Interactive map of the Kirbergturm area

General information
- Location: Weilmünster, Hesse, Germany
- Coordinates: 50.43104°N 8.37283°E
- Completed: 1608

The Kirbergturm (Kirberg Tower), also known as the Römerturm (Roman Tower), is a stone watchtower that is a listed building. It is located in the historic market town of Weilmünster in Hesse. The tower, which is almost 20 meters high, is located in the town center on the Kirberg hill (formerly known as Römerberg). It is one of Weilmünster's main attractions and provides a view of the town from above.

== Description ==
The circular tower is almost 20 meters high and has an outer diameter of 6.4 meters. The wall is 2.2 meters thick and the interior has a diameter of just under two meters. The stone building has a wooden door and a pointed roof.

== History ==
The building, known until the 20th century as the Roman Tower, has nothing to do with the ancient Romans. The hill on which the Kirbergturm was later erected was used in ancient times by Roman soldiers to control the area between the Lahn river and the Taunus mountains, which is where the name Roman came from. When the village of Weilmünster was granted the privilege of holding two fairs a year by Emperor Rudolf II in 1601, work began on expanding the defensive structure that had been built almost 100 years earlier. The tower was built between 1601 and 1608 and is connected to a wall system which encloses parts of the village. The Kirberg was flanked by two other towers a few hundred meters away. The lower gate (the "Weilpforte") is still preserved. However, the fortifications could not prevent Weilmünster from being destroyed during the Thirty Years' War (1618–1648).

The tower and the associated wall later fell into disrepair. Parts of the town wall were demolished. The tower was renovated in 1986/87 and is now a place of interest.

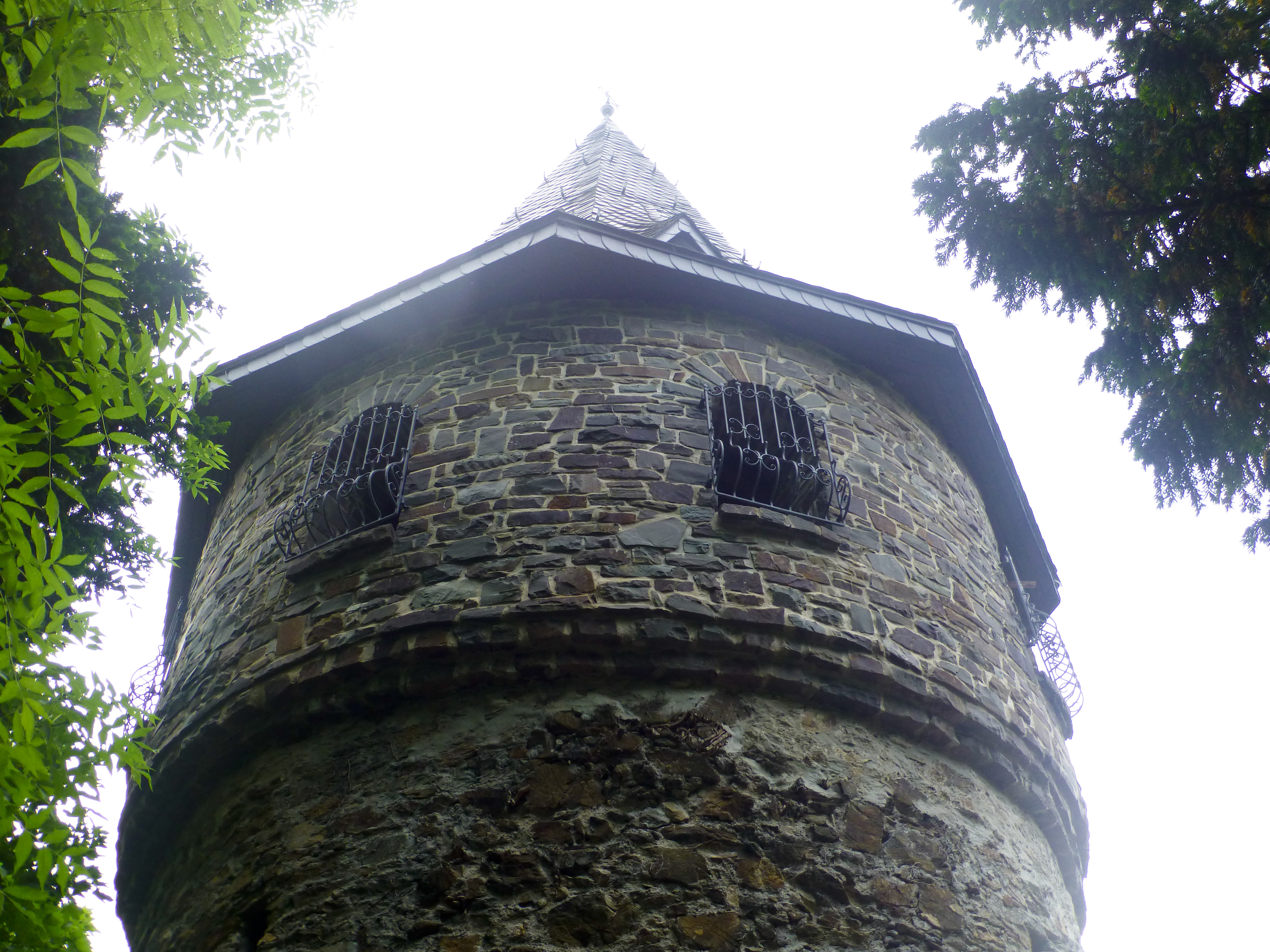
Upper part of the building

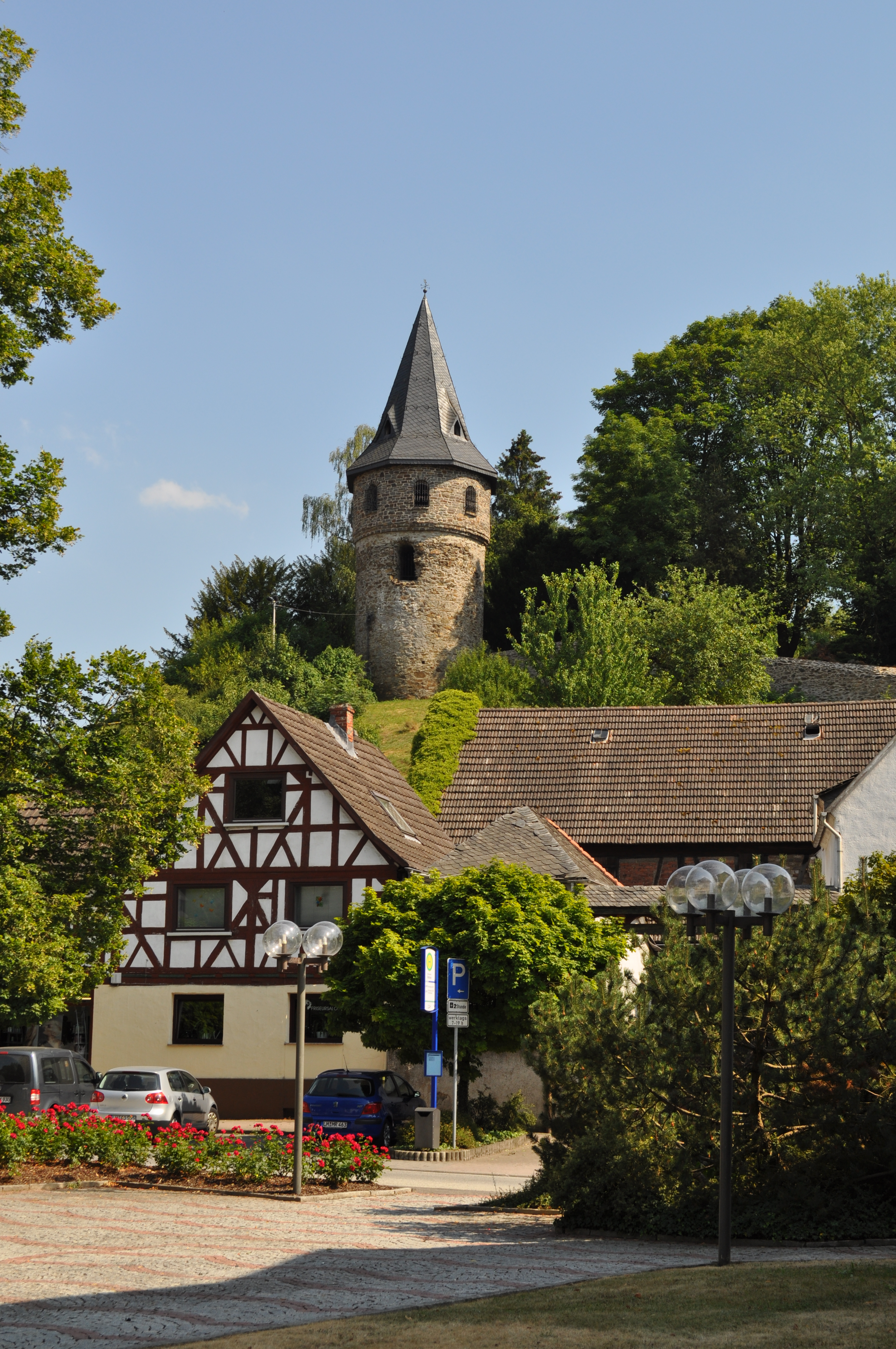
View from Weilmünster town square
