= Weilmünster =

- Municipality
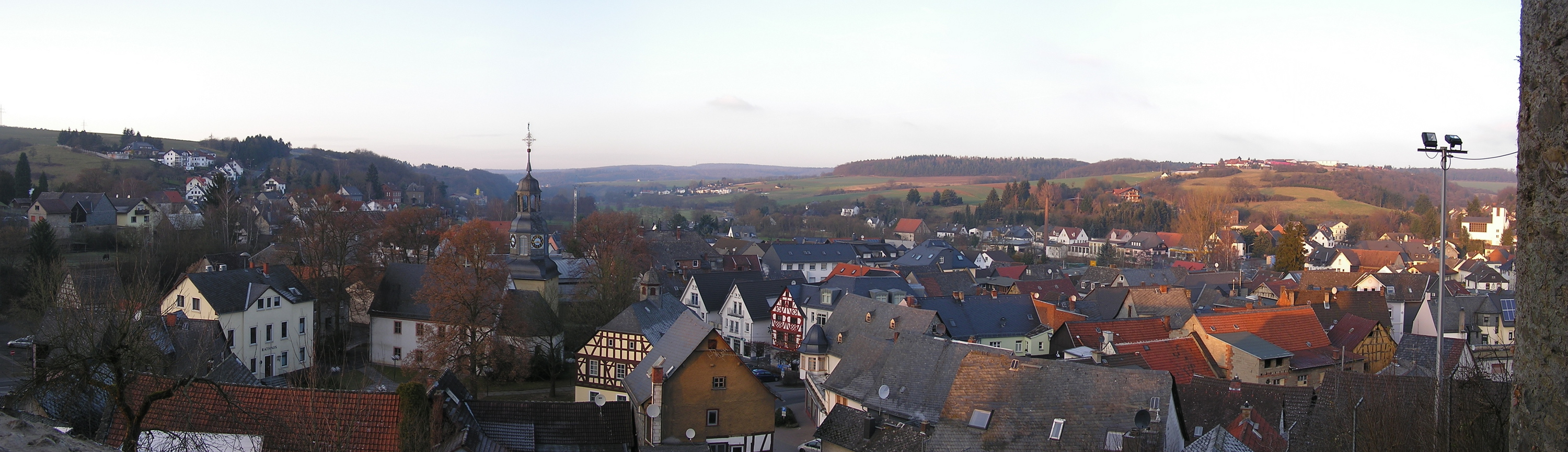
- Panorama of Weilmünster

- Flag Coat of arms

- Location of Weilmünster within Limburg-Weilburg district
- Interactive map of Weilmünster
- Location within Germany Location within Hesse
- Coordinates: 50°26′N 08°22′E
- Country: Germany
- State: Hesse
- Admin. region: Gießen
- District: Limburg-Weilburg

Government
  - Mayor (2018–24): Mario Koschel (Ind.)

Area
  - Total: 77.42 km^{2} (29.89 sq mi)
- Elevation: 193 m (633 ft)

Population (2025-12-31)
  - Total: 8,565
  - Density: 110.6/km^{2} (286.5/sq mi)
- Time zone: UTC+01:00 (CET)
  - Summer (DST): UTC+02:00 (CEST)
- Postal codes: 35789
- Dialling codes: 06472, 06475
- Vehicle registration: LM, WEL
- Website: www.weilmuenster.de

Weilmünster is a municipality in Limburg-Weilburg district in Hesse, Germany.

== Geography ==
Weilmünster is among the most richly wooded places in Limburg-Weilburg. The forestry office looks after not only the State Forest but also twelve municipalities’ woodlands in the south of the Limburg-Weilburg and Lahn-Dill districts.

=== Location ===
The market community of Weilmünster lies on the north slope of the Taunus in the Weil valley, the Weil being a tributary to the Lahn. The nearest major cities are Wetzlar (20 km) to the northeast, Limburg (25 km) to the west and Frankfurt am Main (50 km) to the southeast.

=== Neighbouring communities ===
Weilmünster borders in the north on the towns of Weilburg (Limburg-Weilburg) and Braunfels, in the east on the community of Waldsolms (both in the Lahn-Dill-Kreis), in the south on the communities of Grävenwiesbach, Weilrod (both in the Hochtaunuskreis) and Selters and in the west on the communities of Villmar and Weinbach (all three in Limburg-Weilburg).

=== Constituent communities ===
Weilmünster's main centre, also called Weilmünster (3,543 residents in 2021), is the biggest of the constituent communities in this community of roughly 9,000 inhabitants, to which a further eleven centres belong. The other Ortsteile (with 2021 population) are:

- Aulenhausen (240)
- Dietenhausen (407)
- Ernsthausen (563)
- Essershausen (201)
- Laimbach (235)
- Langenbach (373)
- Laubuseschbach (1,414)
- Lützendorf (184)
- Möttau (332)
- Rohnstadt (261)
- Wolfenhausen (1,044)

Until about 150 years ago, Heinzenberg, which now belongs to Grävenwiesbach, was also one of Weilmünster's constituent communities.

== History ==
In 1217, Weilmünster had its first documentary mention as Wilmunstre. It was, however, by this time already a sizeable village with its own church. History hints that the Fulda Monastery, which had holdings in the village, had this church built sometime in the 9th century. The church that stands today was built in the early 16th century, and its square defensive tower sometime around 1300. As of 1601, a regular market is known to have been being held in Weilmünster. The community belonged to Nassau, and after the division of inheritance to Nassau-Weilburg. From 1806 it belonged to the Duchy of Nassau. In 1866 it passed to Prussia, becoming part of the Province of Hesse-Nassau.

Industrialization began early. In the early 16th century there was an ironworks with a blast furnace in Weilmünster. Later came foundries and other metalworking businesses. This industrial development, however, was short-lived. While the road through the Lahn valley was expanded and the Lahn was channelled, Weilmünster, which lay off these arteries, fell behind. The building of the Weilstraße (“Weil Road”) in 1860 came too late, and the railway only reached Weilmünster in 1908.

In 1421, there was a forest smithy in Audenschmiede. It developed itself into a nationally important smithy that, in 1798 passed into the ownership of the Buderus firm when it was founded, and until 1930 it was one of the firm's most important locations.

During Nazi Germany, the mentally ill and handicapped of the 1897 Landesheil- und Pflegeanstalt Weilmünster (English: State Medical and Care Facility) were forcibly sterilized and systematically underfed or killed with drug overdoses. From 1937 to 1945, more than 6,000 people died there, among them all Jewish patients. Preliminary proceedings against the facility's staff for having taken part in the Nazi murder of the sick were suspended in 1953.

The old community of Weilmünster in the former district of the Oberlahnkreis was merged in the 1970s with other communities into the greater community of Weilmünster.

Of today's constituent communities, Möttau had its first documentary mention in 802, Laubuseschbach in 897, Wolfenhausen in 1194, Essershausen in 1233, Lützendorf in 1234, Dietenhausen in 1301, Ernsthausen in 1309, Laimbach in 1344, Langenbach in 1335, Rohnstadt in 1355 and Aulenhausen in 1565.

== Politics ==
The municipal election held on 14 March 2021 yielded the following results:

Parties and voter communities		% 2021	Seats; 2021	% 2016	Seats; 2016	% 2011	Seats; 2011	% 2006	Seats; 2006	% 2001	Seats; 2001
SPD	Social Democratic Party of Germany	39.5	12	35.6	11	45.5	14	43.1	13	43.3	13
CDU	Christian Democratic Union of Germany	32.7	10	32.2	10	37.9	12	41.2	13	40.5	13
BL	Bürgerliste FWG-F.D.P.	17.2	6	19.1	6	16.6	5	15.7	5	10.9	3
BfW	Bürger für Weilmünster	10.6	3	13.2	4	–	–	–	–	–	–
GREENS	Bündnis 90/Die Grünen	–	–	–	–	–	–	–	–	5.2	2
Total		100.0	31	100.0	31	100.0	31	100.0	31	100.0	31
Voter turnout in %		49.2		52.0		49.3		48.4		56.9	

=== Mayors ===
- Faust, Andreas 1835–1874
- Eppstein, Johann Christian 1867–1875, 1876–1880, 1880–1891
- Dienst, Philipp Friedrich 1891–1896
- Eppstein, Philipp 1896–1900
- Klein, Philipp Heinrich 1900–1926
- Müller, August 1926 – 1933
- Färber, August 1933 – 1941
- Weil, Hermann 1941–1945
- Weil, Albert 1945
- Metzler, Adolf 1945–1946
- Weil, Albert 1946–1948
- Weinbrenner, Friedrich 1948 (first deputy)
- Benz, Albert 1948–1951
- Dr. Kottek 1951–1952 (first deputy)
- Benz, Wilhelm 1952–1958
- Windmeier, Waldemar 1958–1988
- Pfeiffer, Klaus 1988–1994
- Heep, Manfred 1994–2018
- Koschel, Mario since 2018

=== Coat of arms ===
The community's arms in their current form were conferred on 1 July 1935 by the Chief President (Oberpräsident) of the Province of Hesse-Nassau and on 30 September 1983 they were confirmed by the Hessian Minister of the Interior. At the same time, through a separate document, the community of Weilmünster (Oberlahnkreis) was granted the right to bear the title Marktflecken (“Market Community”).

The church in the arms is modelled on the Weilmünster Evangelical church. The golden lion with the seven billets was the coat of arms borne by the former Duchy of Nassau. It is known that today's arms were already borne shortly after the Thirty Years' War as an official seal.

=== Flag ===
The community's flag has two coloured stripes in orange and blue, alternating at a point one third the way down the flag, which has the proportions 5:2. The point where the colours alternate is overlaid with the community's coat of arms. The colours recall the colours flown by the former Duchy of Nassau.

=== Town partnerships ===
Le Cheylard, Ardèche, France since 1963.

Since 1963 the market town Weilmünster is associated with the southern French municipality of Le Cheylard. However, the first contacts between representatives of both municipalities go back till 1959. At that time many towns and municipalities tried to make a contribution to the reconciliation with the former war opponent of France in which they closed partnerships with French municipalities. Weilmünster elected Le Cheylard in the north of the department Ardeche in the Central Massif. This provincial town is situated at the mouth of the Thorne in the Eyrieux, a tributary of the Rhone, about 60 km to the west of Valence. After the union celebrations in 1963 a regular exchange of groups of schoolchildren took place. Choirs, sports teams and official delegations from both municipalities visited the respective twin town. The people get a look received insight into the normal life of the families of the country in the neighbourhood. This led to numerous private friendships between the families. Only this can protect the continuity of town twinning. After more than 40 years of partnership, it only stays alive, the union was confirmed and renewed since 1963 first in 5/30/2003 in Le Cheylard and in 5/21/2004 in Weilmünster with big participation of the population in attractive ceremonies. The official local committees can support and promote, but the partnership remains vividly only if many citizens are interested in our twin town in future.

== Culture and sightseeing ==
- Old Nassau Amtshaus
- Weilmünster Evangelical Church with Wehrturm (“Defence Tower”)
- Ernsthausen Evangelical Church
- Essershausen Evangelical Church
- Langenbach Evangelical Church
- Laubuseschbach Evangelical Church
- Wolfenhausen Evangelical Church
- Timber-frame houses
- "Kirbergturm" (lookout tower)
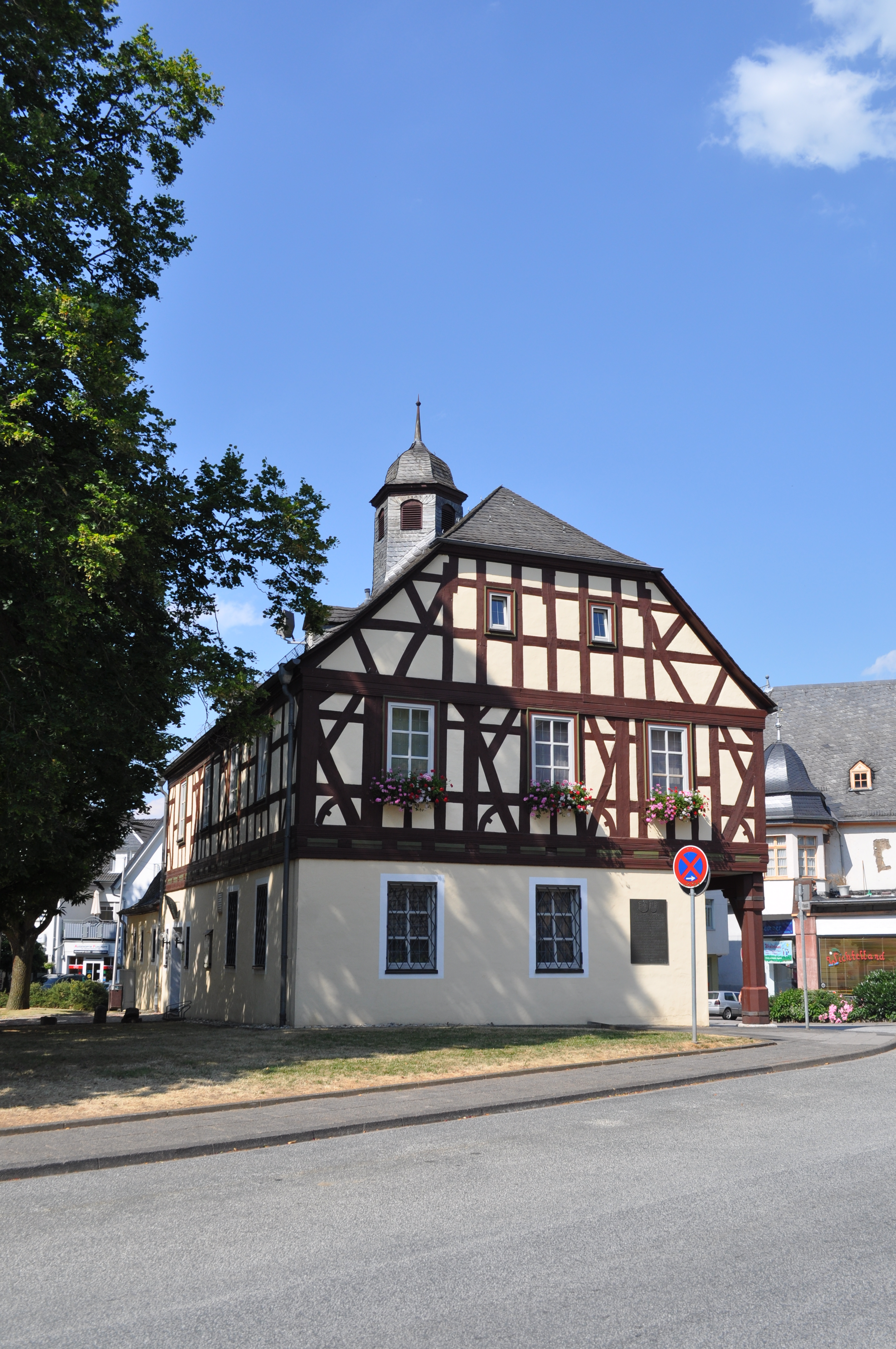
Old Amtshaus

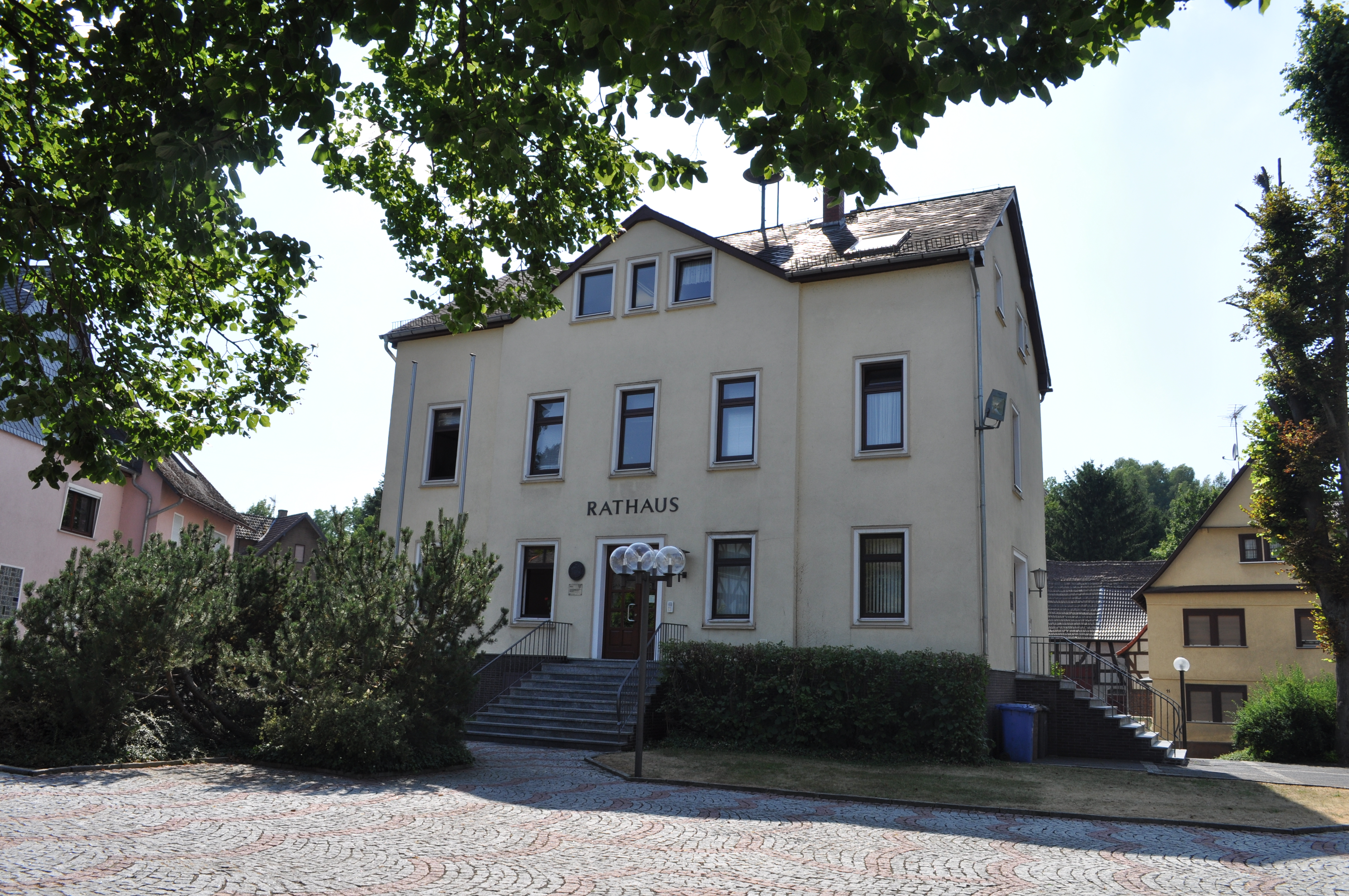
Town hall

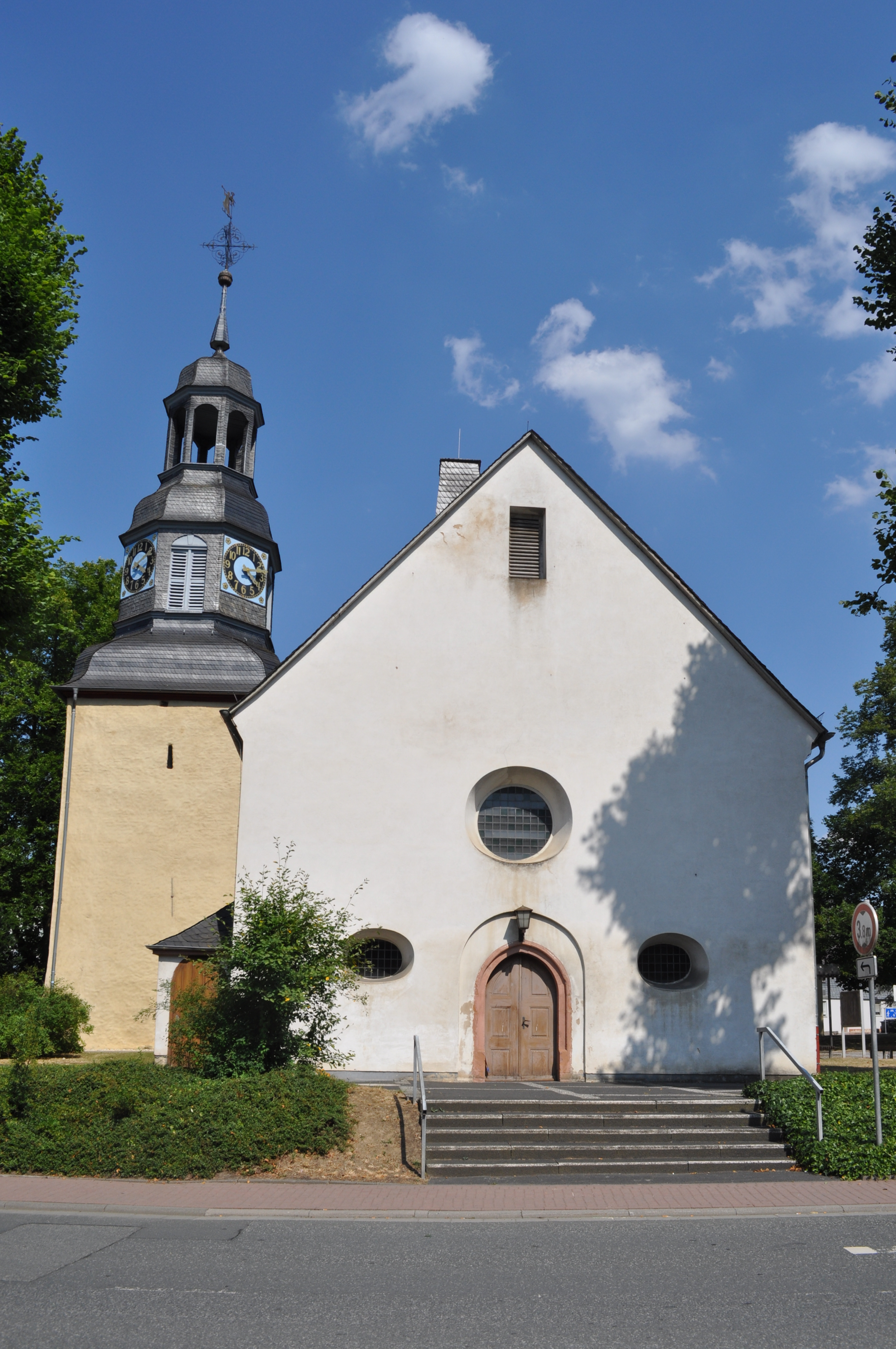
Weilmünster Church

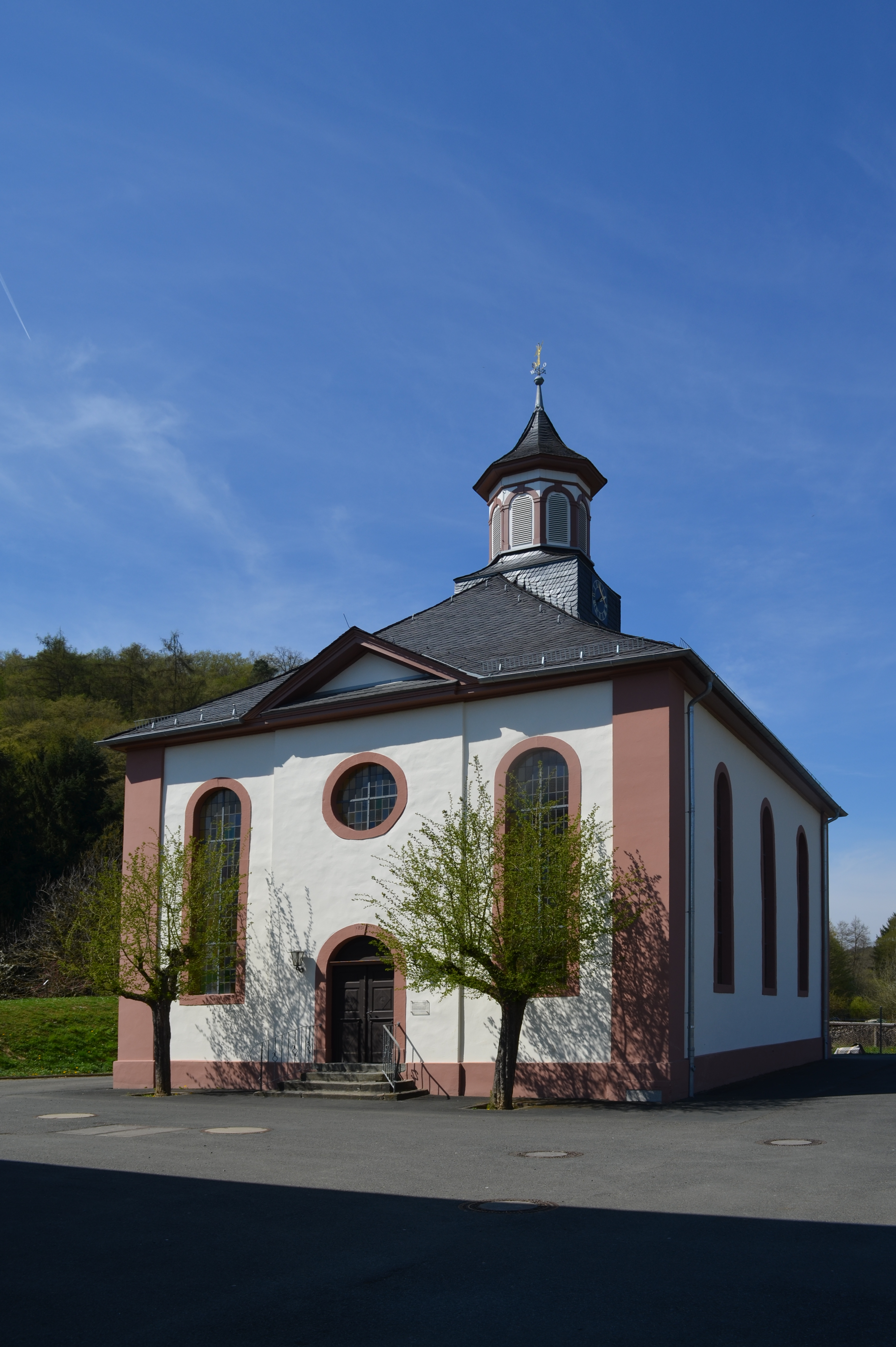
Ernsthausen Church

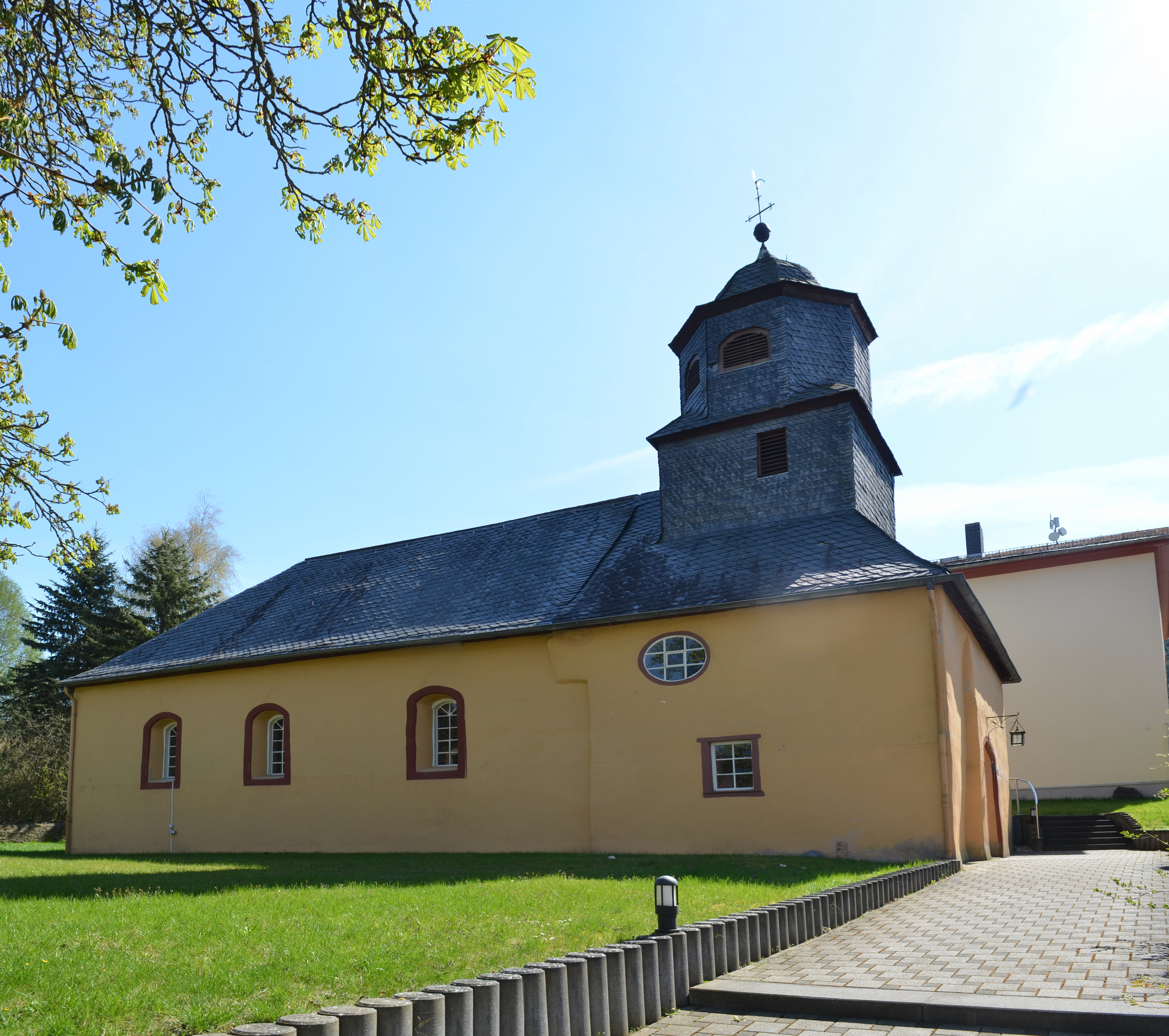
Essershausen Church

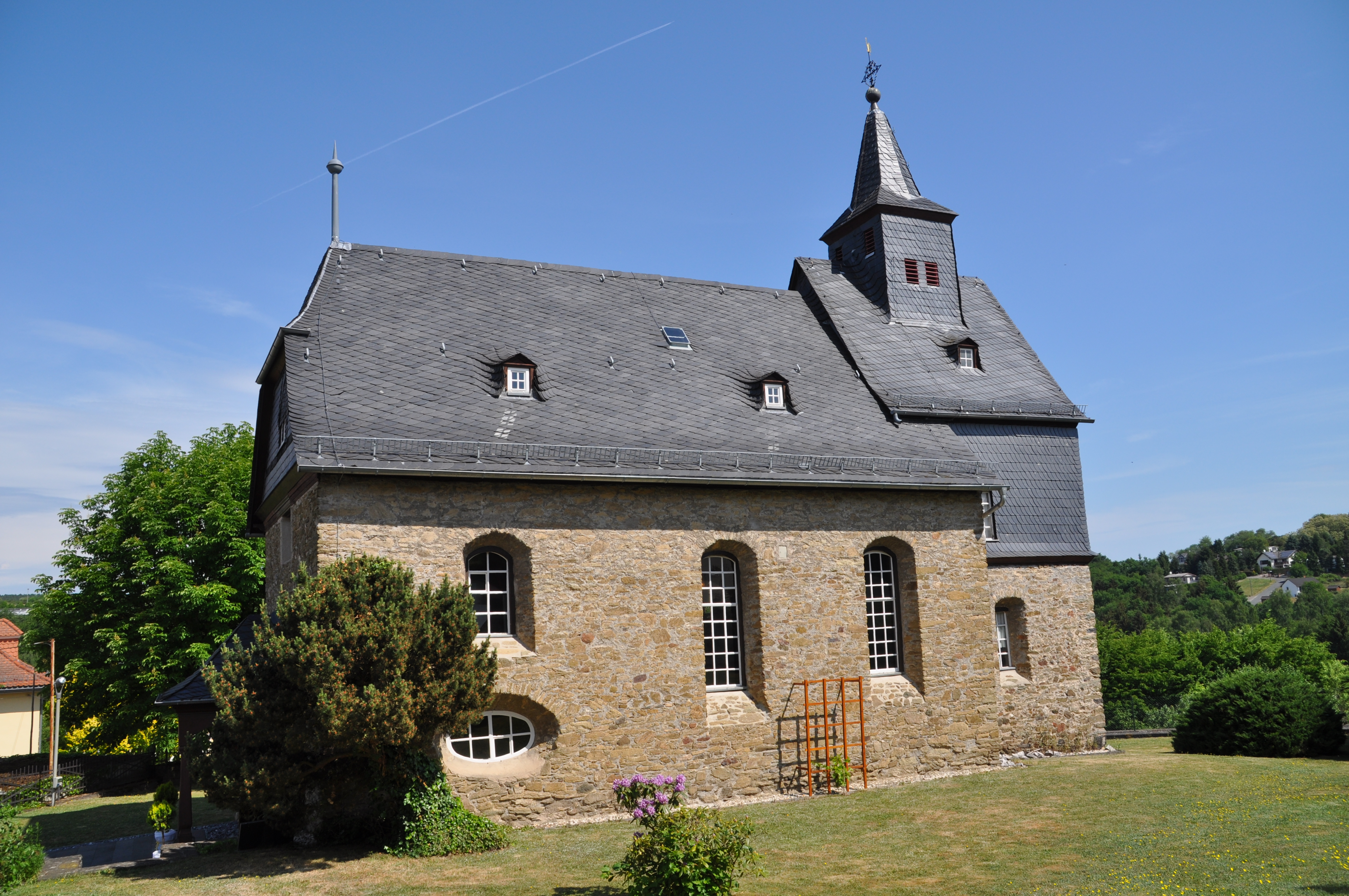
Laubuseschbach Church

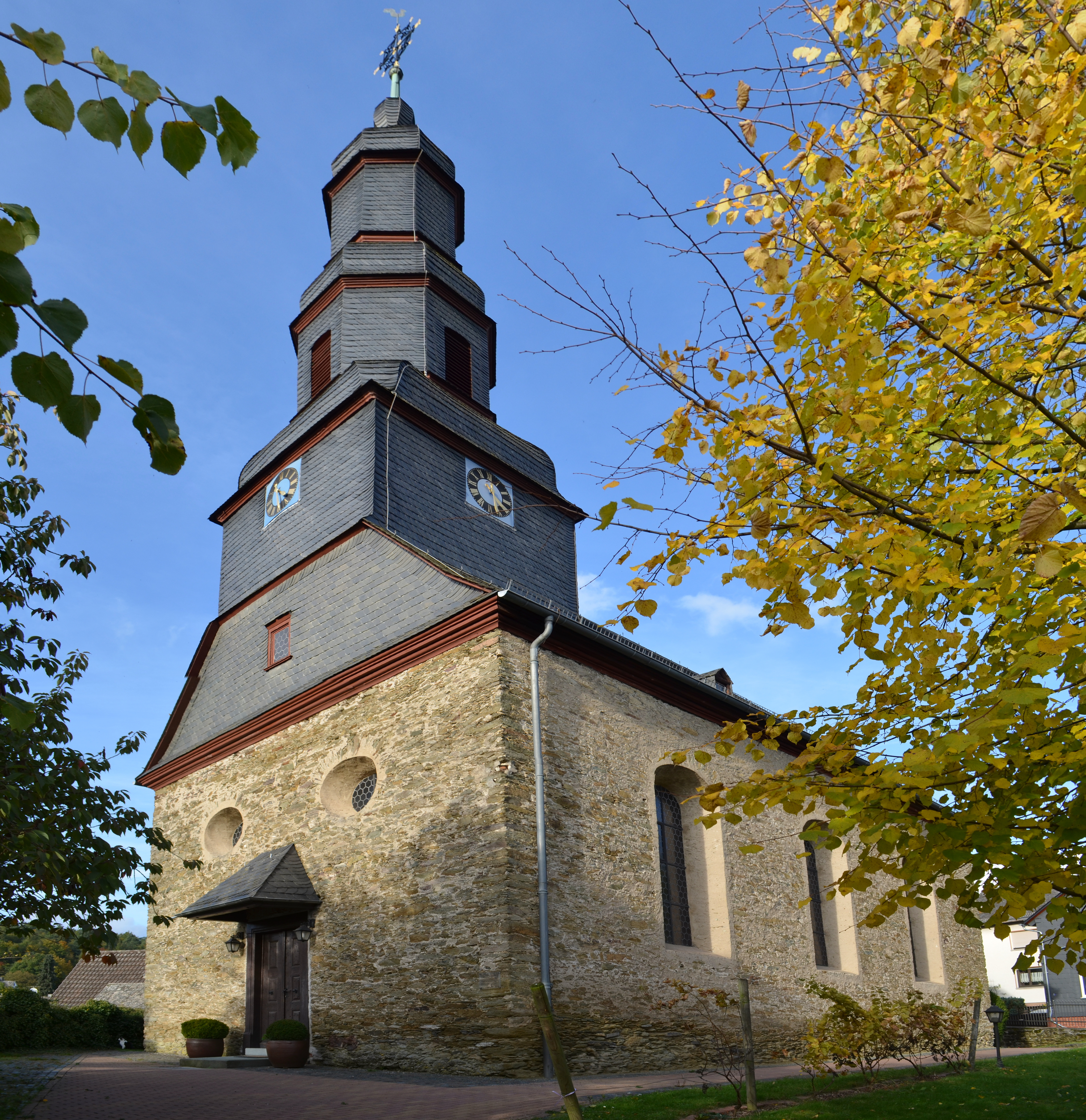
Wolfenhausen Church

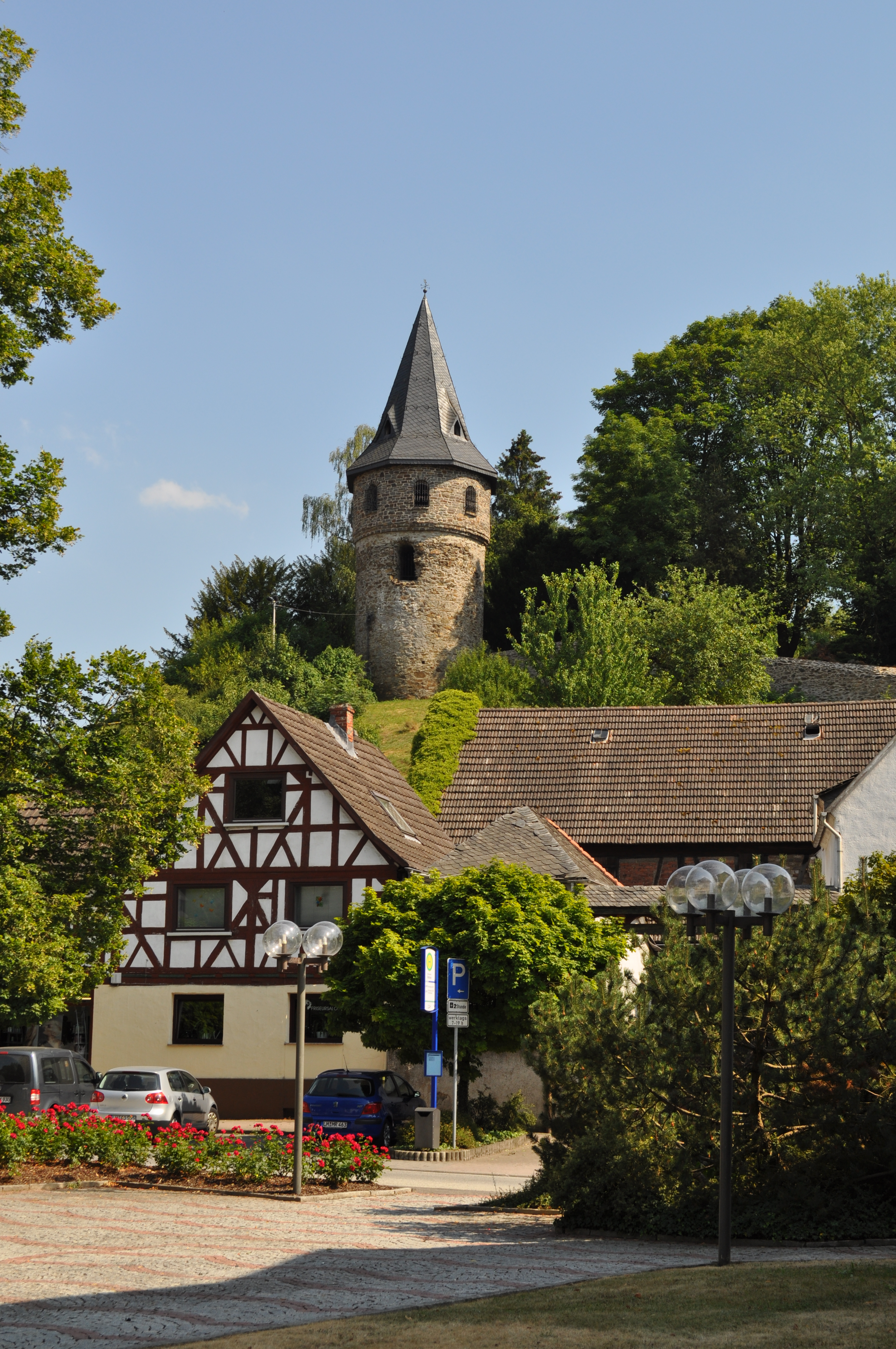
Kirbergturm

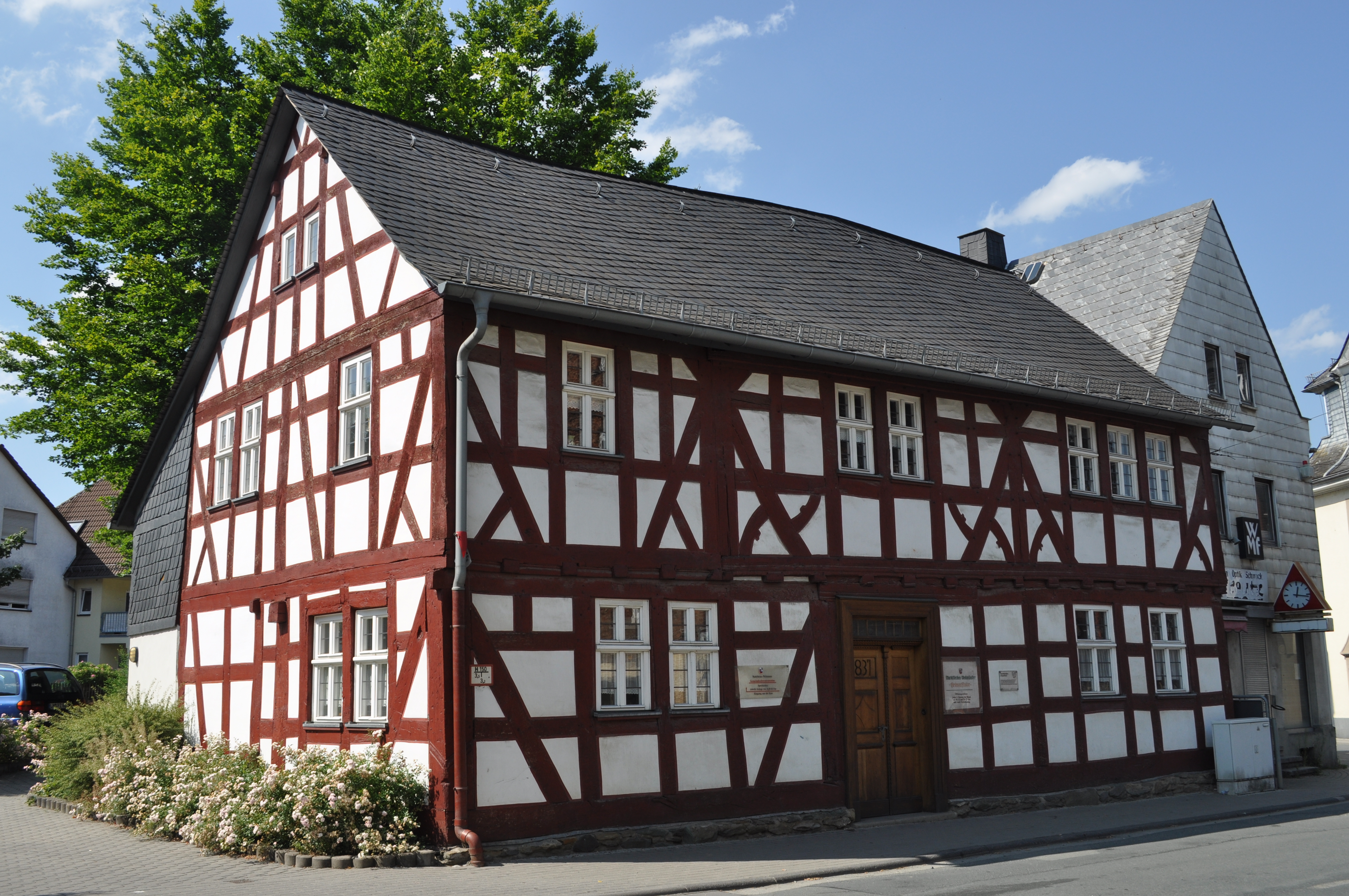
Old timber-frame house

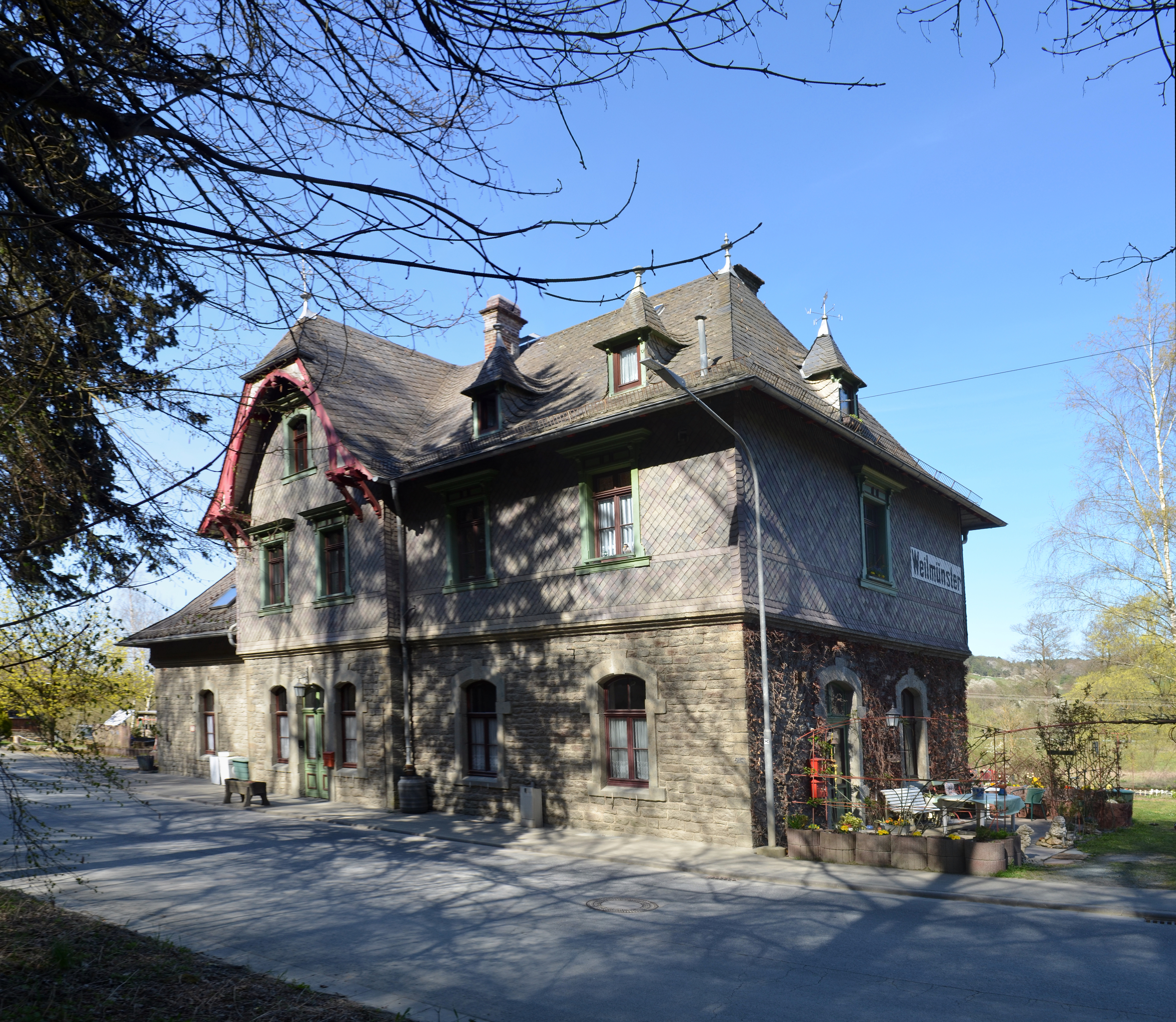
Former railway station

== Demographics ==
According to the 2011 census, 9,038 residents lived in Weilmünster on May 9, 2011. According to age, 1,560 residents were under 18 years of age, 3,648 were between 18 and 49, 2013 were between 50 and 64, and 1,815 residents were older. Among the residents, 540 (6.0%) were foreigners, of whom 148 came from other EU countries, 314 from other European countries and 81 from other countries. By 2020, the share of foreigners had increased to 8.9%. In 2011 5,329 residents were Protestants (59.0%), 1,479 were Catholics (16.3%) and 2,230 were others (24.7%).

Historical population development
Year	Population
1834	1,299
1852	1,550
1871	1,517
1905	2,744
1946	3,328
1961	3,675
After enlargement
1975	9,118
1990	8,904
2000	9,399
2011	9,038
2022	8,916

== Economy and infrastructure ==
=== Transport ===
Weilmünster lies on Bundesstraße 456 on which Weilburg and Bad Homburg vor der Höhe can be reached. The distance to Frankfurt Airport is roughly 60 km.

The Weiltalbahn, the former railway line from Weilburg to Grävenwiesbach (and on to Frankfurt) led through Weilmünster. Besides the railway station itself, the resort institution had its own halt. Within the community, a spur branched off this line to Laubuseschbach.

Since then, all the tracks have been torn up without a trace, and the railway's right-of-way has in great parts been used to build the Weil Valley Bicycle Path. The spur line, too, can now be used by hikers, cyclists or inline skaters. In Weilmünster, the last witnesses to the railway are the old station building and the walled-up tunnel portals. The stone arches of the viaduct stood until August 2007 when they had to give way to a road-widening project.

Within the framework of the reactivation of the Grävenwiesbach-Brandoberndorf railway line, a new connection to the rail network was considered for Weilmünster; however, there was no concrete followup to these plans.

== Business ==
The Weilmünster Clinic is, with 680 staff, the greater community's biggest employer. The second biggest is the car supplier Reum in Audenschmiede. There are many family businesses here. There are a roadbuilding company, a furniture shop and a great number of small businesses and handicraft enterprises. Weilmünster's main centre supplies medical, shopping and school services, and it is also there that the community nursing station and the local history parlour can be found.

=== Education ===
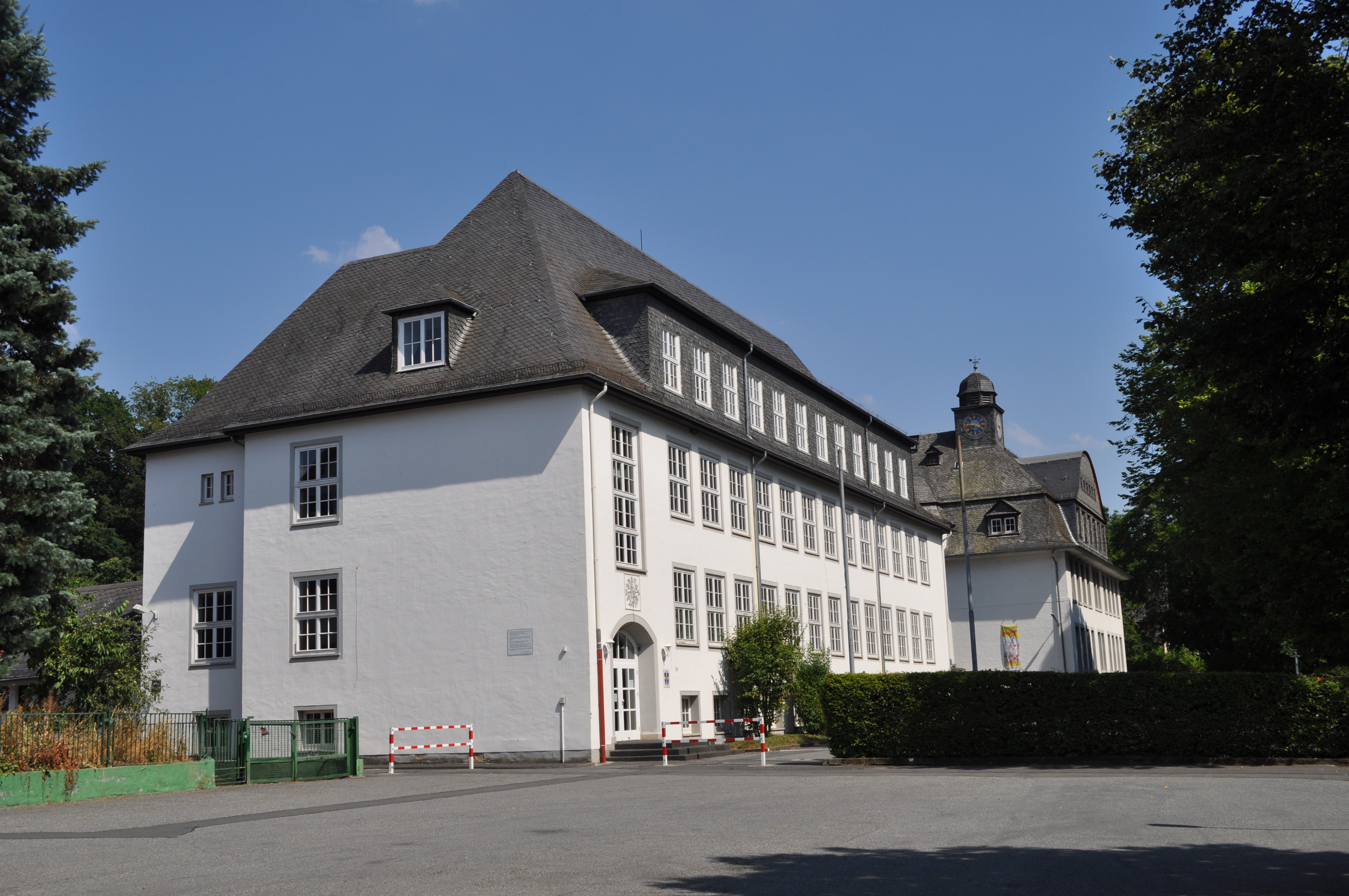
Weilmünster primary school

Weilmünster is home to a primary school which serves as a “midpoint school”, a coöperative comprehensive school with Hauptschule, Realschule and Gymnasium branches with years 5 to 9. Students from Weilmünster attend higher schools in Weilburg.

=== Public institutions ===
- Weilmünster Volunteer Fire Brigade, founded 1910 (includes youth fire brigade)
- Aulenhausen Volunteer Fire Brigade, founded 1934 (includes youth fire brigade)
- Dietenhausen Volunteer Fire Brigade, founded 1934 (includes youth fire brigade)
- Ernsthausen Volunteer Fire Brigade, founded 1932 (includes youth fire brigade)
- Essershausen Volunteer Fire Brigade, founded 1934
- Laimbach Volunteer Fire Brigade, founded 1934 (includes youth fire brigade)
- Langenbach Volunteer Fire Brigade, founded 1934 (includes youth fire brigade)
- Laubuseschbach Volunteer Fire Brigade, founded 1934 (includes youth fire brigade)
- Rohnstadt Volunteer Fire Brigade, founded 1934 (includes youth fire brigade)
- Wolfenhausen Volunteer Fire Brigade, founded 1932 (includes youth fire brigade)

=== Regular events ===
Weilmünster has held market rights for more than 400 years and makes lively use of trade and market even today. People still flock to the community's three yearly markets, the Frühlingsmarkt (“Spring Market”, held in March), the Bauernmarkt (“Farmers’ Market”) and the Martinimarkt.

Moreover, sporting events such as the Weiltal-Marathon in April, and the autofreie Weiltal (“carfree Weil valley”, held on a Sunday in August) keep drawing visitors to the community, as is also the case with the Weiltalweg and the new recreational vehicle campsite. Other events include:

- the Weiltal-Familien-Radtour (cycling tour) in collaboration with the Weilmünster Transport and Beautification Club, in June;
- the Apfellauf (“Apple Walk”) in collaboration with the Kelterei Heil (wine pressing workshop), in July;
- the Weinfest, also in July;
- Kirmes (with farmers’ market), in September;
- the Martinimarkt Weilmünster, in November.

== Sons and daughters of the place ==
- Wilhelm Franz (1864–1948), architect and university lecturer, city architect, builder of the Dillingen town hall
- Ernst Schiele (1865–1933), born in Audenschmiede, industrialist and parliamentarian
- Ernst Loew (1911–1988), Member of Parliament
- Reinhold Staudt (1928–1978), politician (SPD)

== Sources ==
- Erco von Dietze: Archiv Evangelische Kirchengemeinde Weilmünster I. 1565–1975. Findbuch. 1989
- Erco von Dietze: Archiv Evangelische Kirchengemeinde Weilmünster II. (Ernsthausen) 1766–1976. Findbuch. 1989
