= Weilmünster Church =

Weilmünster Protestant Church
- Evangelische Kirche Weilmünster
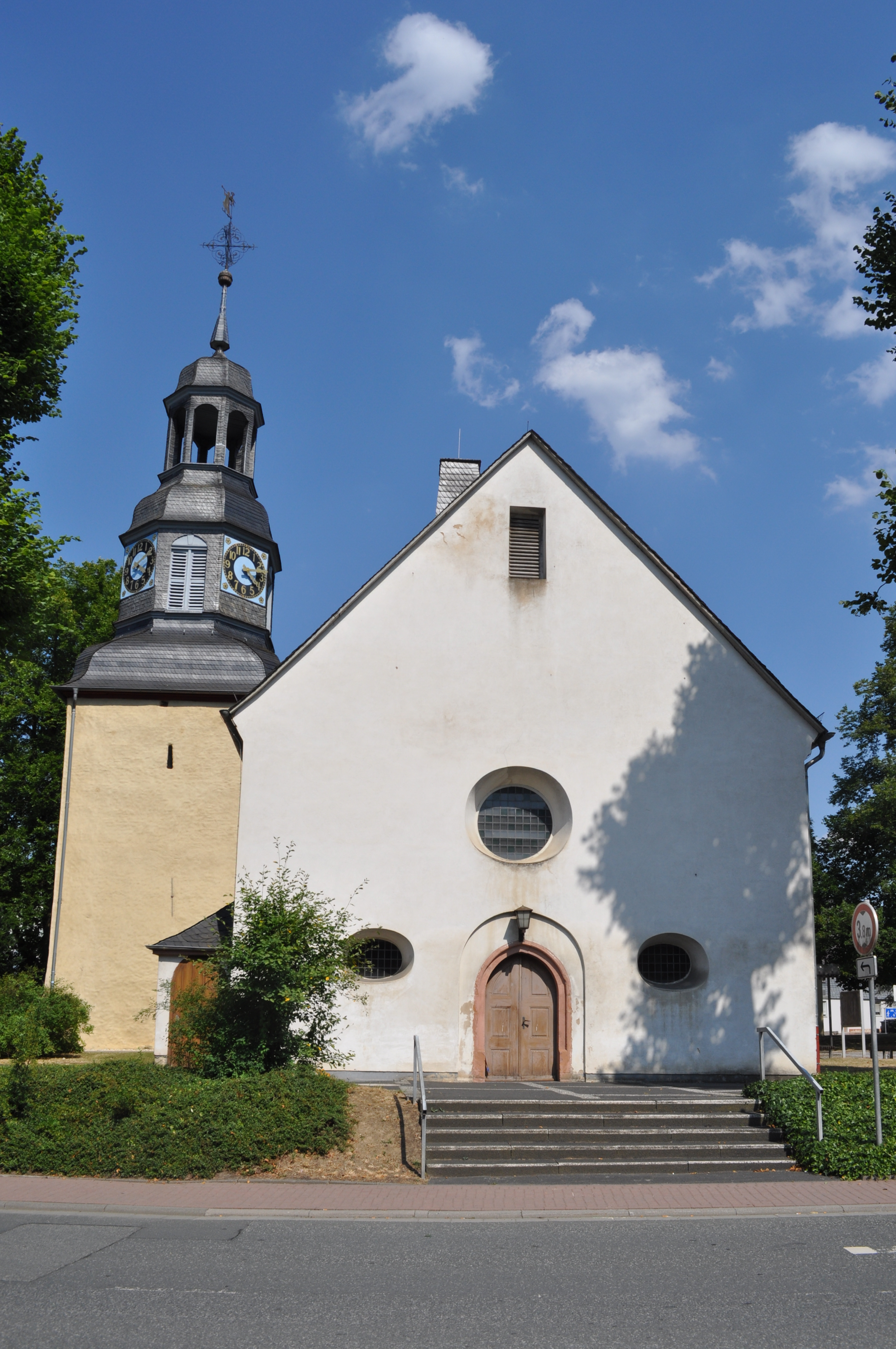
- View of the church
- Weilmünster Protestant Church
- 50.431828°N 8.372016°E
- Location: Weilmünster, Hesse
- Country: Germany
- Denomination: Protestant Church in Germany

History
- Status: Parish church
- Consecrated: 12/13th century

Architecture
- Functional status: Active

Administration
- Diocese: Hesse and Nassau
- Deanery: an der Lahn
- Parish: Weilmünster I

The Weilmünster Protestant Church is a listed church building located in Weilmünster, a historic market town in the Limburg-Weilburg district of Hesse. The church belongs to the Weilmünster I parish in the deanery on the Lahn of the Evangelical Church in Hesse and Nassau. It is a protected cultural heritage site in Hesse, listed by the Landesamt für Denkmalpflege Hessen.

== The church ==
The aisleless church, which was built or converted in several construction phases, is east-facing. Its oldest part is the free-standing church tower with a square floor plan on the north side, the tower of a former fortified church from the 12th or 13th century that has become too small. The two lower floors are covered with barrel vaults. In 1731 it received a slate-covered, octagonal tower that houses the tower clock and the belfry. On top of it sits a bell-shaped hood crowned by a lantern. The nave was completed in 1511. Between 1580 and 1620, the three-sided gallery on balusters was built into the flat-roofed nave for the growing community. In the years 1789–1791, today's rectangular windows were broken through. The portal in the west also dates from this time. The choir has a three-sided end and is covered with a groin vault. The choir and the nave are connected by a wide, pointed choir arch. On the basket of the pulpit there are reliefs with the busts of the four evangelists. The pulpit stood behind the altar until 1950, but is now free-standing. The organ was built in 1776.

== Literature ==
- Georg Dehio: Handbuch der deutschen Kunstdenkmäler, Hessen 1, Regierungsbezirke Gießen und Kassel. Deutscher Kunstverlag, Berlin und München 2008, ISBN 978-3-422-03092-3, p. 932–33.
