= Ernsthausen Church =

Ernsthausen Protestant Church
- Evangelische Kirche Ernsthausen
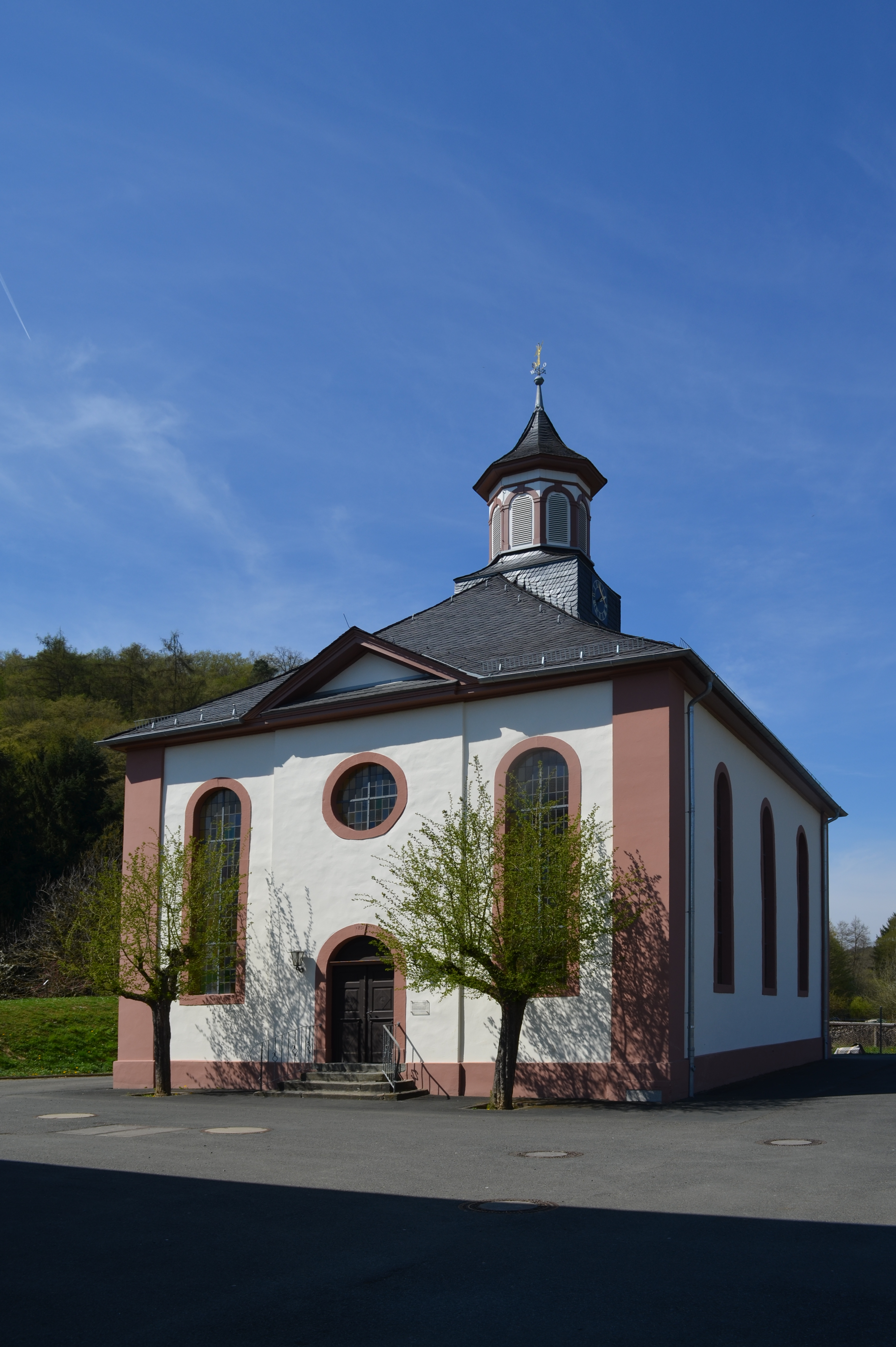
- View of the church
- Ernsthausen Protestant Church
- 50.451923°N 8.351628°E
- Location: Weilmünster, Hesse
- Country: Germany
- Denomination: Protestant Church in Germany

History
- Status: Parish church
- Consecrated: 1832

Architecture
- Functional status: Active
- Completed: 1832 (194 years ago)

Administration
- Diocese: Hesse and Nassau
- Deanery: an der Lahn
- Parish: Weilmünster II

The Ernsthausen Church is a Protestant church building in Ernsthausen, a village of the municipality of Weilmünster in the Limburg-Weilburg district (Hesse). The church belongs to the parish of Weilmünster II in the deanery on the Lahn of the Protestant Church in Hesse and Nassau. It is a protected cultural heritage site in Hesse, listed by the Landesamt für Denkmalpflege Hessen.

== History ==
After the old church building in Ernsthausen, built in 1766, burned out, it had to be demolished. The new church was inaugurated in 1832. The square hall church is covered with a hipped roof, from the center of which rises a square roof turret on which an octagonal lantern sits. It looks like a central building. The building is characterized by high arched windows, wide pilaster strips at the corners and a risalit in the facade.

The interior houses a pulpit altar. The three-sided galleries stand on Doric columns, which continue as supports for the flat ceiling.

== Literature ==
- Dehio, Georg (1964). Handbuch der deutschen Kunstdenkmäler (in German). ISBN 978-3-422-03092-3.
