= Laubusbach =

River in Germany

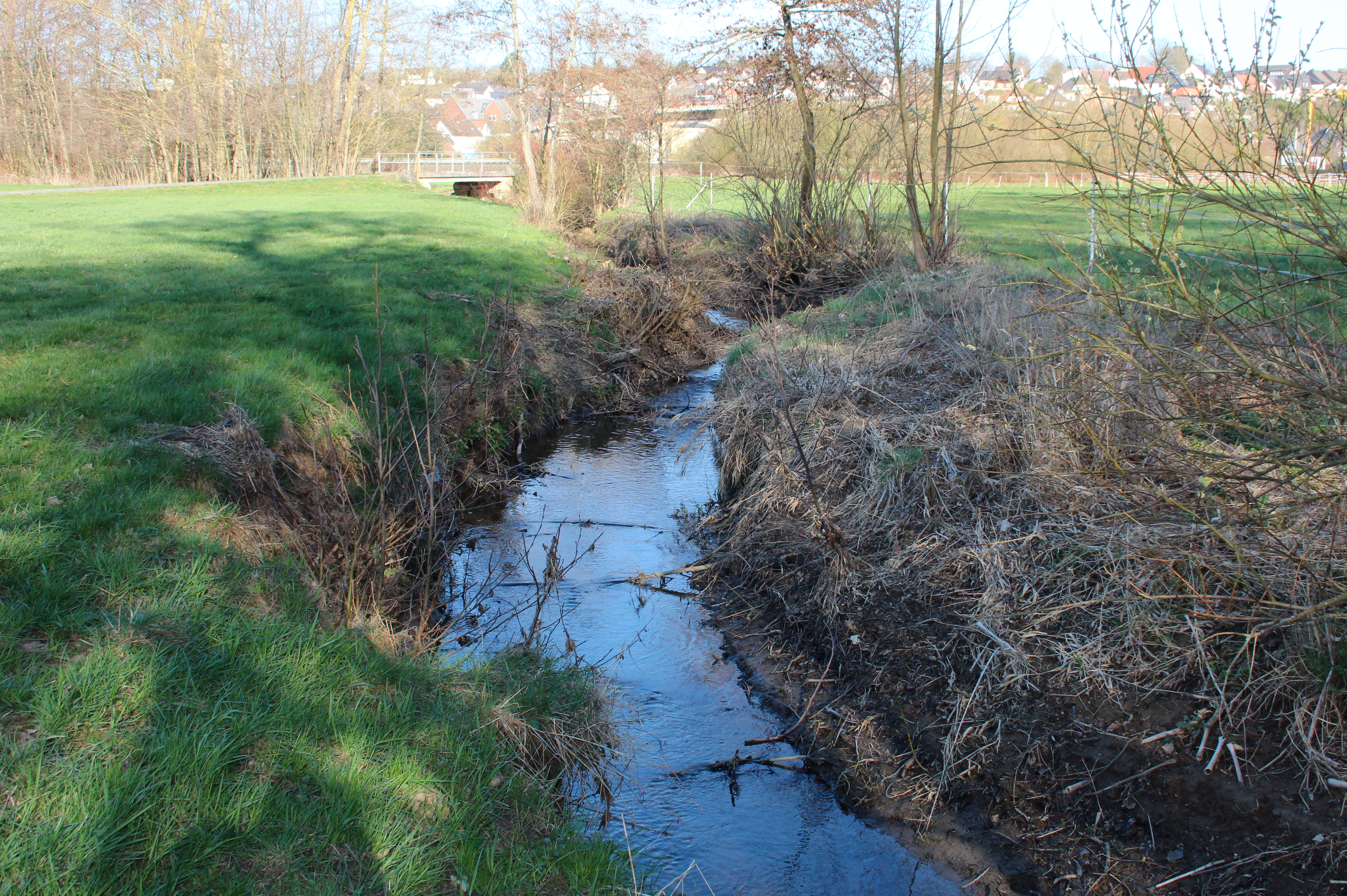

Location
- Country: Germany
- State: Hesse

Physical characteristics
- Mouth
  - location: Emsbach
  - coordinates: 50.3509°N 8.1904°E
- Length: 14.0 km (8.7 mi)

Basin features
- Progression: Emsbach→ Lahn→ Rhine→ North Sea

Laubusbach is a river of Hesse, Germany. It flows into the Emsbach in Oberbrechen.

== See also ==
- List of rivers of Hesse
