= Frankfurt Physical Society =

German learned society

- Physikalischer Verein – Gesellschaft für Bildung und Wissenschaft
- Formation: October 24, 1824; 201 years ago
- Founders: Johann Valentin Albert, Ehregott Wilhelm Gottlieb Bagge, Johann Jacob Casimir Buch, Gottfried Malß, Johann Michael Mappes, Heinrich Conrad Meyer, Christian Ernst Neeff, Johann Georg Neuburg, Detmar Wilhelm Soemmerring, Ludwig Thilo, Joseph von Aschbach, Johann Andreas Weber
- Type: NGO, learned society
- Headquarters: Arthur-von-Weinberg-Building
- Location: Frankfurt, Germany
- Coordinates: 50.11694°N 8.65138°E
- Members: 2,365 (2024)
- Official language: German
- President: Dorothée Weber-Bruls
- Budget: 610,000 euro (2024)
- Staff: 4 (2024)
- Volunteers: 59 (2024)
- Website: physikalischer-verein.de

The Frankfurt Physical Society (German: Physikalischer Verein) is a learned society based in Frankfurt, Germany. The society was founded in 1824 by physicians, educators and businessmen with the aim of promoting the study of physics and chemistry among its members. The society provided access to scientific instruments and chemicals for private experimentation and hosted lectures on recent discoveries, whether made by its own members or reported from elsewhere. In the following years, volunteer committees were formed within the society to collect meteorological data, research ways to ensure the synchronisation of the city's clocks, and to establish a library.

Starting in the 1830s, the city of Frankfurt supported the society financially to employ a full-time lecturer, who in turn was required to teach students at the local Gymnasien. With a growing staff of full-time lecturers and voluntary committees, the society functioned as a kind of university for Frankfurt during the Gründerzeit period in the mid- to late 19th century. Students could attend weekly lectures, often focused on introducing fundamental concepts in chemistry and physics as well as participate in week-long practical training sessions in the society's laboratories. Toward the end of the 19th century, the society expanded rapidly, supported by Frankfurt's growing industry. In 1906, a new headquarters, now known as the Arthur-von-Weinberg-Building, was inaugurated, featuring the society's first purpose-built astronomical observatory.

As Frankfurt had no university at the time, the society played a foundational role when efforts led by Franz Adickes to establish one began to take shape. It contributed research institutes, along with staff and facilities, including its headquarters, to the founding of what would become Goethe University Frankfurt in 1914. Following the hyperinflation in the Weimar Republic, the society was no longer able to finance its personnel, and the university fully took over the institutes and their staff. The society subsequently shifted its focus to public outreach, especially in the fields of astronomy and physics, repurposing its observatory for public use.

The Society's main building was destroyed during the Bombing of Frankfurt am Main in World War II, and the observatory was not reopened until 1960. The building continued to be used by the university until 2005. Today, it is owned by the Senckenberg Nature Research Society, but the society still maintains its headquarters and a public observatory on the premises.

Frankfurt Physical Society now primarily focuses on public engagement in physics and astronomy. It organizes lectures, outreach events, and public observing nights. The society operates three observatories: the public observatory in Frankfurt, the Hans-Ludwig-Neumann-Observatory at the Kleiner Feldberg, and a remote observatory in Spain used by members and students for spectroscopic research.

== History ==
=== Founding and first years ===
The society often cites Johann Wolfgang von Goethe as an inspiration for its foundation. During a visit to his hometown of Frankfurt in 1815 and 1816, Goethe criticized the lack of scientific institutions in the city, stating:

Wäre es möglich, einen tüchtigen Physiker herbei zu ziehen, der sich mit dem Chemiker vereinigte (...); setzte man auch diesen in Stand, die (...) nötigen Instrumente anzuschaffen, so wäre in einer großen Stadt für wichtige, insgeheim immer genährte Bedürfnisse und mancher verderblichen Anwendung von Zeit und Kräften eine edlere Richtung gegeben.

[If it were possible to attract a capable physicist [to Frankfurt] who would unite with the chemist (...); if he were also put in a position to acquire the instruments necessary (...), then a more noble direction would be given in a large city for important needs that are always secretly nourished and for many a pernicious use of time and energy.]

— Johann Wolfgang von Goethe, "Am Rhein, Main und Neckar". Autobiographische Schriften.

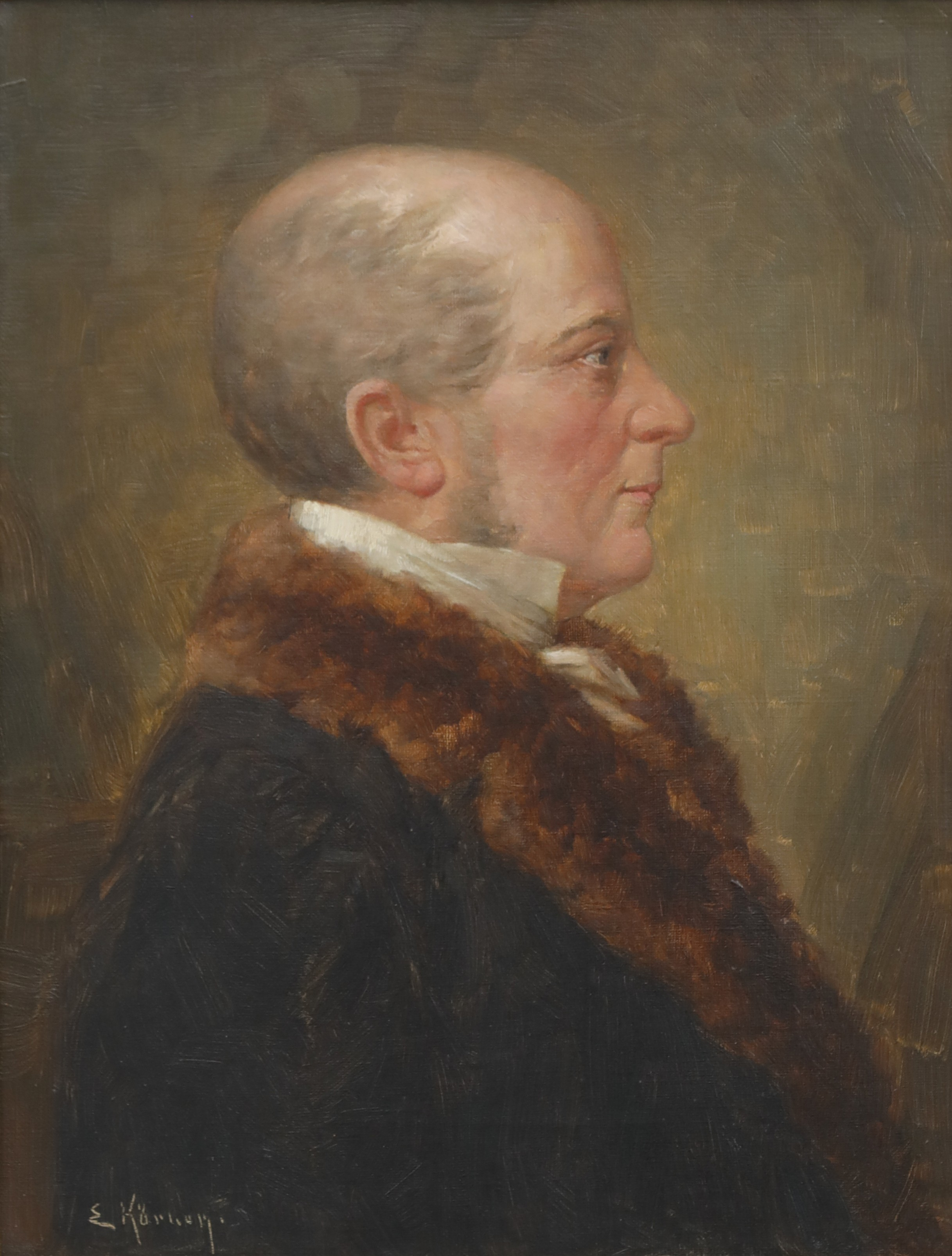
Christian Ernst Neeff

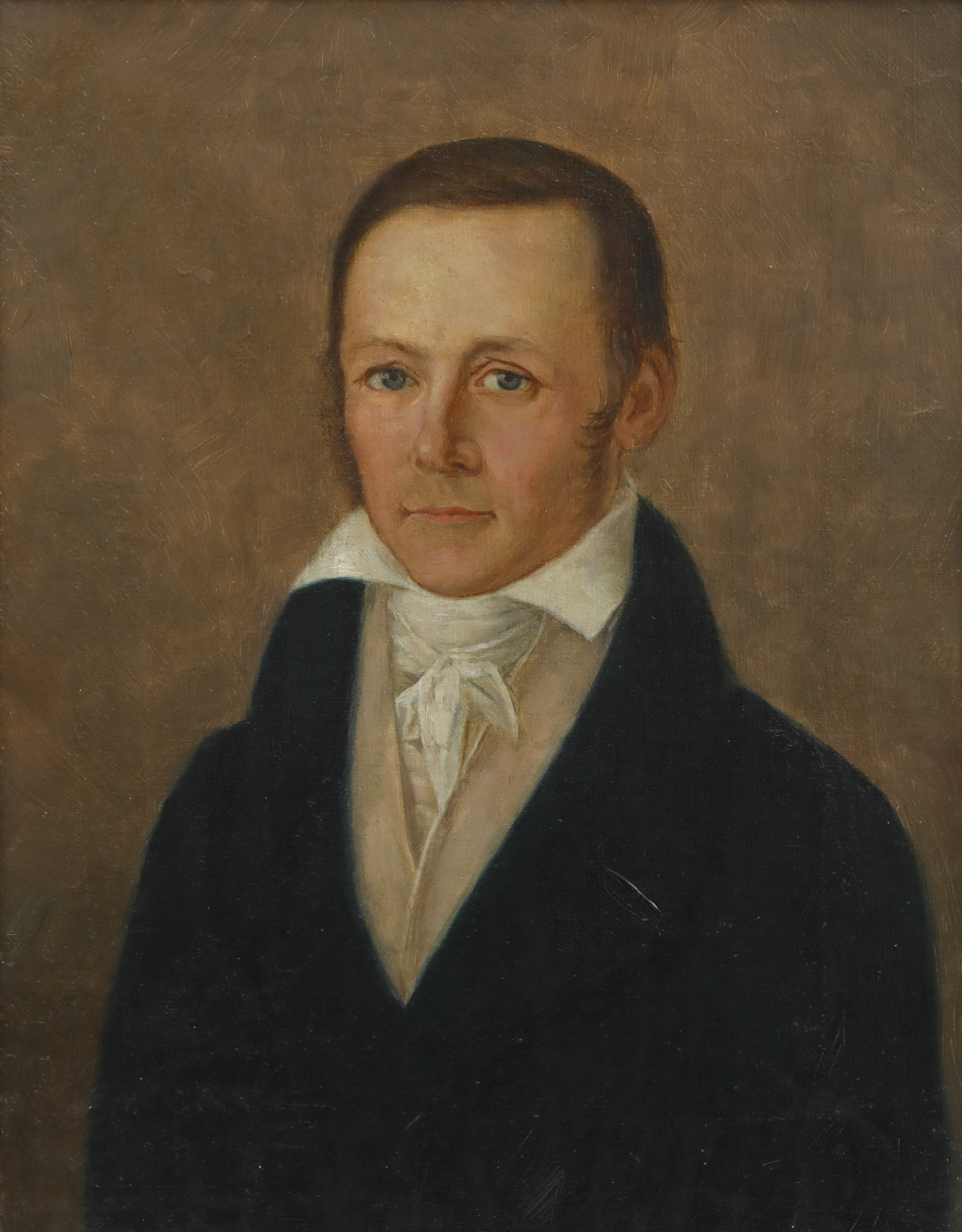
Johann Valentin Albert

Following Goethe's visit, the Senckenberg Nature Research Society was established in 1817. However, some members expressed dissatisfaction with its focus on natural history collections, preferring instead to promote developments in physics and chemistry. In July 1824 Frankfurt-based merchant Johann Valentin Albert published a bulletin calling for the establishment of a physikalisches Cabinet, a public cabinet or museum for instruments used in physics and chemistry. Albert operated a store for novelty items, toys and physical devices he manufactured himself.

Following this bulletin, on 24 October 1824, a group of Frankfurt citizens decided to establish a new society focused on physics and chemistry. In addition to Albert, an important figure in the foundation was the physician Christian Ernst Neeff who was interested in animal magnetism.

The cabinet opened its doors to the public on 29 October 1824. The first statutes of the society regulated how and when members could borrow equipment, including the fees owed to Albert. It was Neeff who formally inaugurated the Verein on 24 November 1824. In his inauguration speech, he argued that countries like England and France had prospered due to scientific advancement and that the Free City of Frankfurt had to catch up. He emphasized that the society should address a broad section of the city's population.

Lectures began on 10 December 1824, when Albert's son presented a new type of water meter. External speakers were invited, and beginning in 1826 Ernst Chladni held a series of lectures, demonstrating his Chladni figures. On 4 February 1826, he also spoke about the "possibility of the existence of living beings on the other bodies in our solar system".

The society initially operated out of Johann Valentin Albert's private residence on Schäfergasse. Members could visit the cabinet daily, while non-members were granted access on Saturdays. However, this arrangement soon proved insufficient, and Albert sold his residence to purchase a larger property on Töngesgasse.

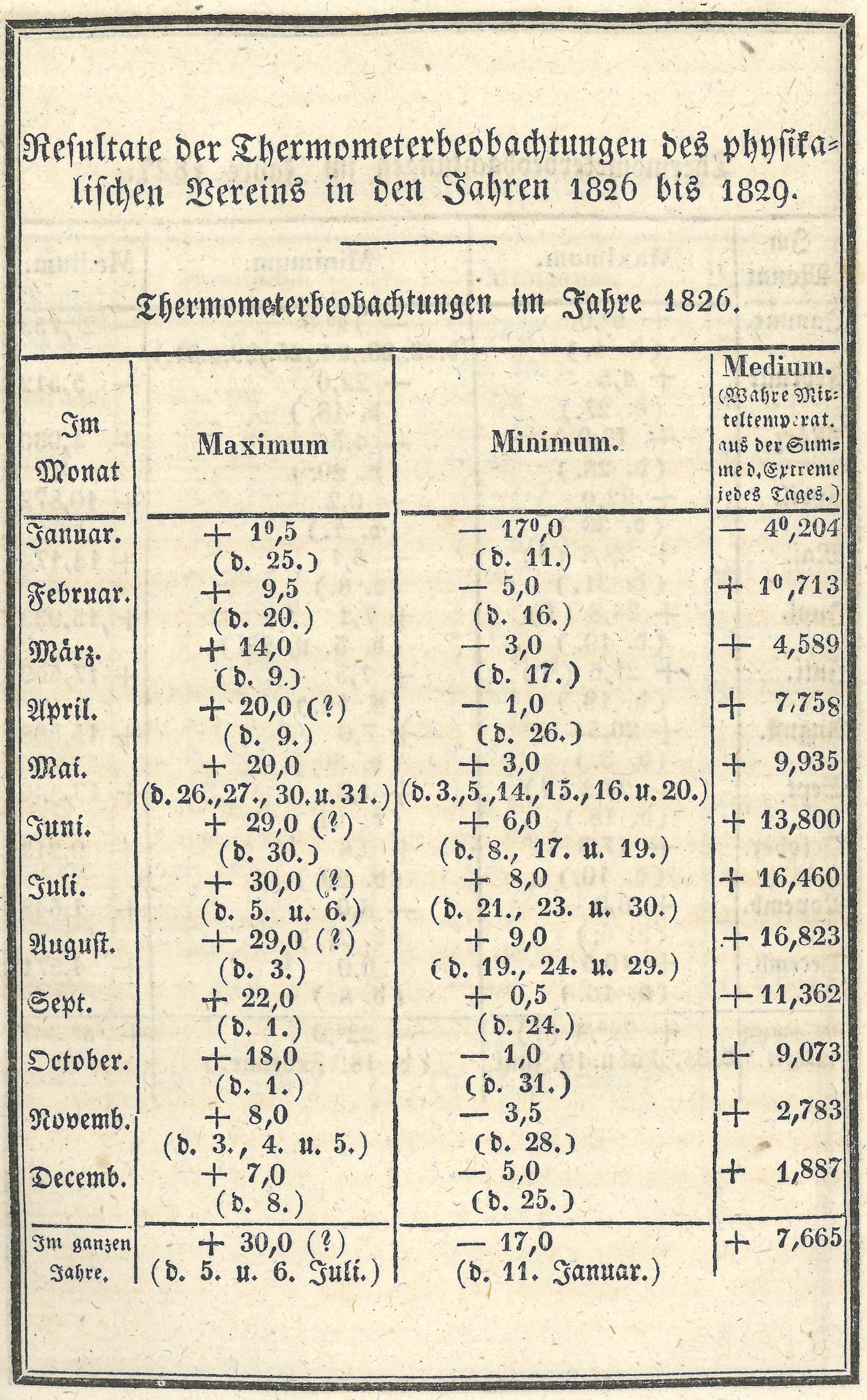
Table showing the maximum, minimum, and average monthly temperatures in 1826, recorded in the Réaumur scale, an example of meteorogical data collected by the society

In October 1825, a member of the society proposed initiating systematic meteorological observations to collect weather data. A committee was quickly formed and acquired the necessary instruments, including a thermometer and a hygrometer.

In response to a call by the Royal Society of Edinburgh, the society contributed data for a coordinated campaign of weather observations across Europe on 15 January and 17 July 1827. Efforts were also made to expand the data collection network by establishing a weather station on the Großer Feldberg, although the first attempt in 1828 failed due to a snowstorm. In the meantime, a volunteer-run station in Frankfurt was collecting measurements at 9:00 am, 12:00 pm, 3:00 pm, and 10:00 pm.

Based on these observations, the committee compiled the first weather reports for Frankfurt, which were published in the newspapers Frankfurter Oberpostamtszeitung and Zeitung der Freien Stadt Frankfurt. These reports provided retrospective data rather than forecasts. Goethe received copies of the reports from the society; his secretary expressed gratitude and requested that they continue to be sent in January 1827.

=== Reaching out to the public ===
Following the success of its early lectures, the society continued its efforts to engage with the interested public. In 1828 and 1829, the well-known physicist Beat Friedrich von Tscharner was invited to deliver two series of lectures. The society published its own lecture schedule in 1828/1829. In 1831, it released a more extensive publication: a yearbook titled Jahrbuch zur Verbreitung naturwissenschaftlicher Kenntnisse. The compendium, intended as a yearly publication, compiled scientific content designed to appeal to a broader Frankfurt readership, including lecture summaries and various data collections. These included astronomical and meteorological tables based on the society's own observations, Jewish calendar holidays, and miscellaneous facts such as the heights of the world's tallest mountains and buildings in the local unit of length. However, the idea of publishing a yearly compendium of useful scientific information proved to be unsuccessful, at least financially, only one edition of the yearbook was ever published.

At a time of rising public interest in lectures but financial difficulties following the failed publication, chairman Johann Karl Passavant proposed a series of reforms during the 1833 members' assembly. Passavant convinced the society to dissolve its close relationship to Johann Valentin Albert, who had previously been a key figure in the Verein: hosting events in his home, supplying instruments and chemicals, but also operating a business renting and selling these instruments. Some of Albert's public demonstrations in 1831 and 1832 reportedly failed due to his carelessness.

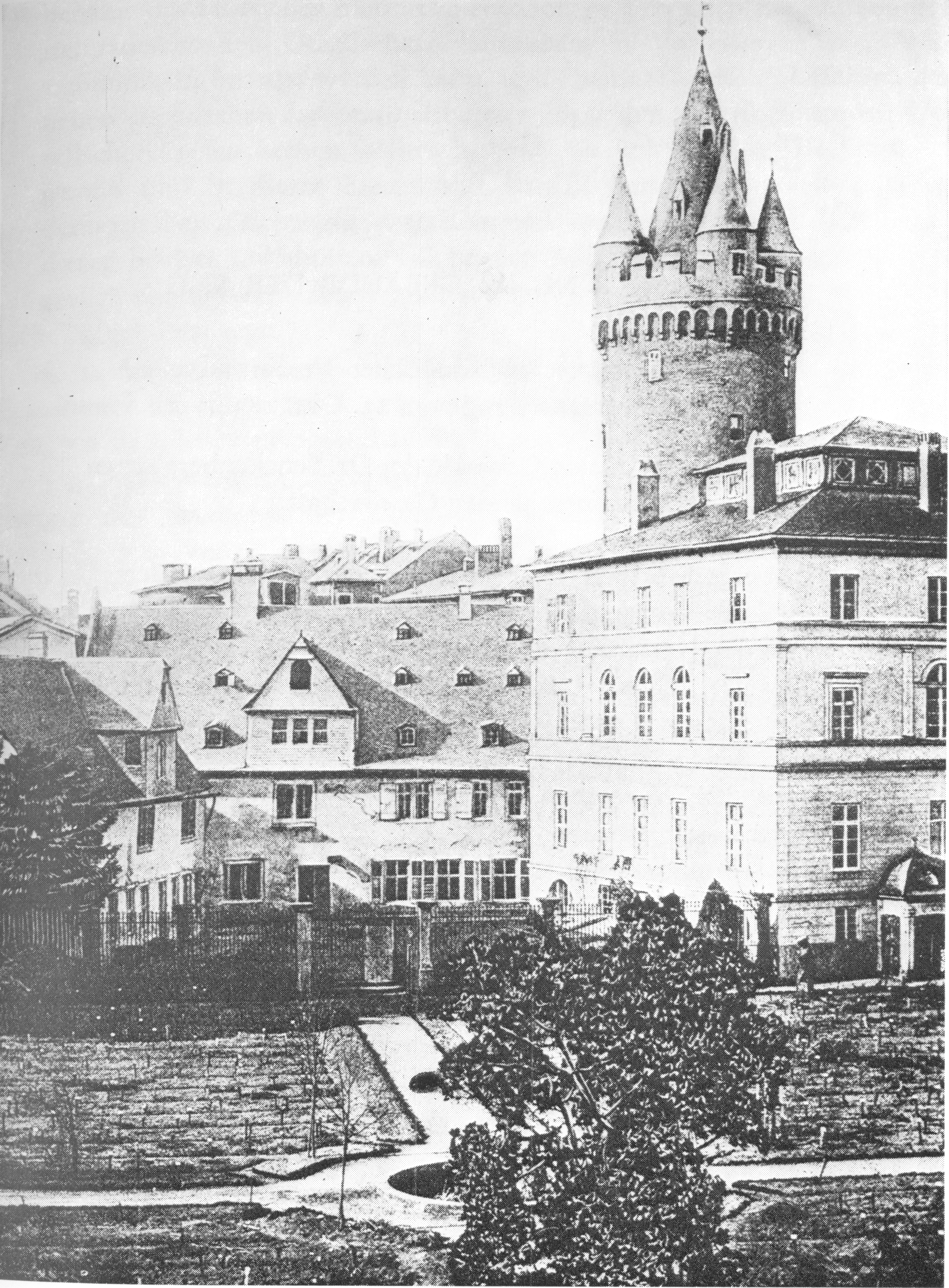
After the separation from Albert the society used parts of the buildings of Senckenberg Foundation, its lecture hall and laboratory housed in the building in the middle

Passavant suggested finding new headquarters for the society, building its own collection of scientific instruments, and hiring a permanent lecturer to ensure a more structured and reliable lecture program. He recommended Karl Wiebel, a scientist who had recently returned from travels across Europe. Passavant was also able to secure a contract with Dr. Senckenbergische Stiftung, which provided rooms free of charge at its premises near the Eschenheimer Turm. The Foundation, the Senckenberg Society and Physikalischer Verein were now housed at the same premises, sharing a library and cooperating in other areas. The connection to Albert was completely dissolved; he even renounced his membership and omitted any reference to his time at the society in his later autobiography.

With financial matters still unresolved, the society sought municipal funding. The city council granted an annual stipend of 1,000 Gulden on the condition that the society employ a lecturer and ensure that lectures were held without interruption. Additionally, students from the local Gymnasiums were to be granted free access to the society's lectures, and the society was expected to provide reports and expert assessments to the municipal authorities.

In 1835, the members' assembly voted to amend the society's statutes to allow for the appointment of honorary members, specifically individuals who had made significant contributions to the sciences or had donated substantial sums to the society. Among the first honorary members were Carl Friedrich Gauß, who was appointed in August 1836, as well as Justus von Liebig and Alexander von Humboldt.

According to Hermann Dechent in his biographical article on Johann Karl Passavant, Passavant was involved in a "re-establishment" of the Society in the mid-1830s; which marked a renewed focus on scientific research and public engagement.

=== First employed lecturers ===
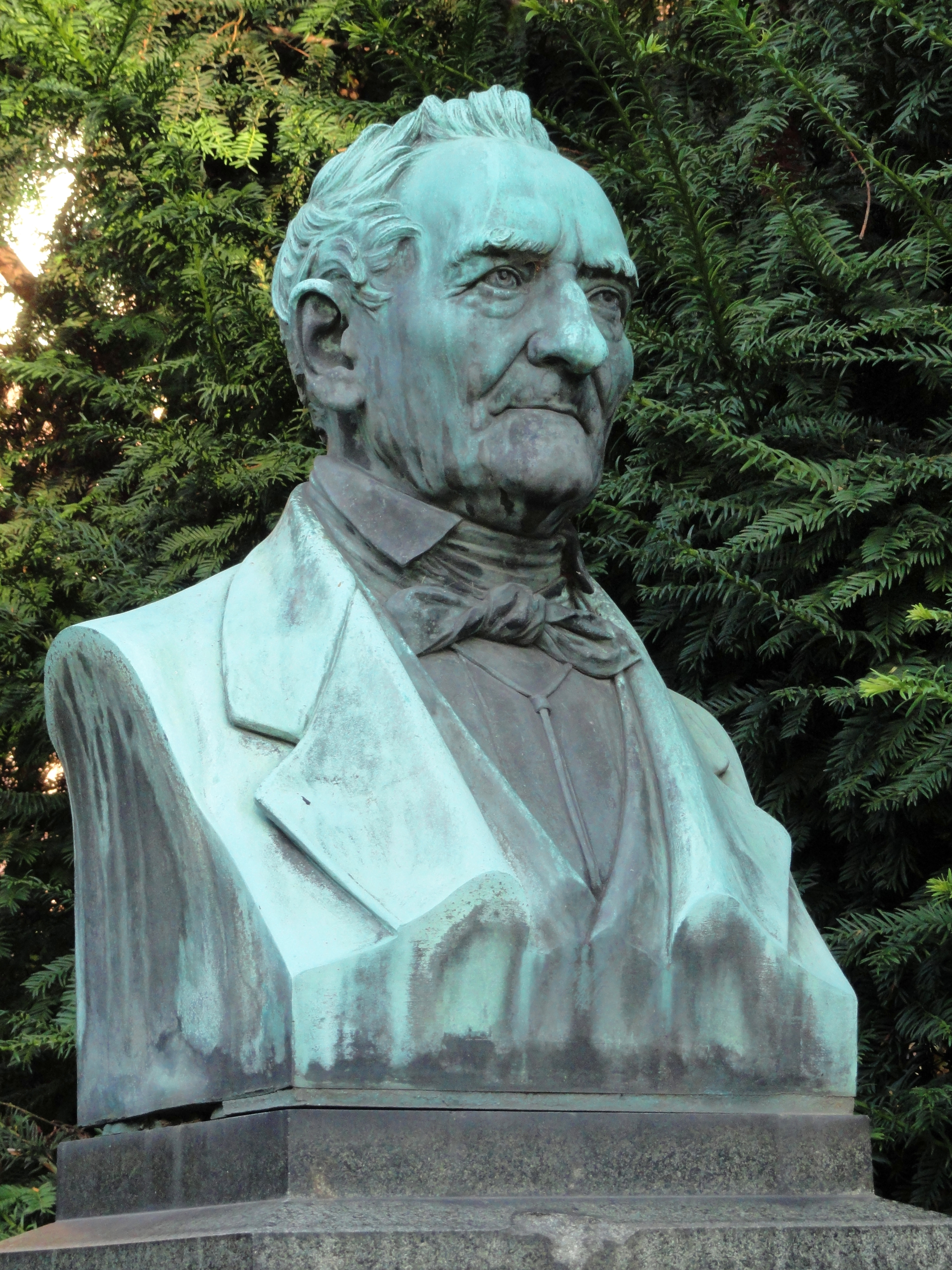
Bust of Christian Rudolf Böttger, commissioned by the society in 1882

In 1833 Karl Wiebel was employed by the society as its first lecturer. His lectures were now open to the public, being held in the lecture hall of Senckenberg Society. Every Saturday a lecture focusing on chemistry, physics, geology, meteorology, geography or astronomy was offered. On other days of the week, a series of lectures focusing on subjects deemed necessary for the "practice and perfection of many new branches of business" was held by Wiebel. The then 27-year-old Wiebel left Frankfurt in 1835 after two years to take a position in Aarau.

His successor was Rudolf Christian Böttger. He held four lectures each week, ranging from fundamental topics from physics such as thermodynamics, to more specific topics like "amphoterism in sugar and glue". In addition to his teaching duties, Böttger was responsible for writing reports for the city. These expert assessments addressed questions posed by the municipal authorities, for example, how to reduce unpleasant odours emitted from a factory after residents had complained, or whether new inventions in gas lighting could be implemented in the city.

These reports were prepared by a committee composed of society members, with Böttger frequently participating and receiving support from volunteers. One such volunteer was inventor Johann Philipp Wagner, who conducted research on replacing steam engines with electric motors for use in factories and transportation. The society attempted to support Wagner in obtaining a patent in Germany for an electric locomotive he had invented, but the application was unsuccessful, as Wagner was unable to demonstrate that his invention could move heavier loads. In 1837, he introduced his interrupter bell to the Society.

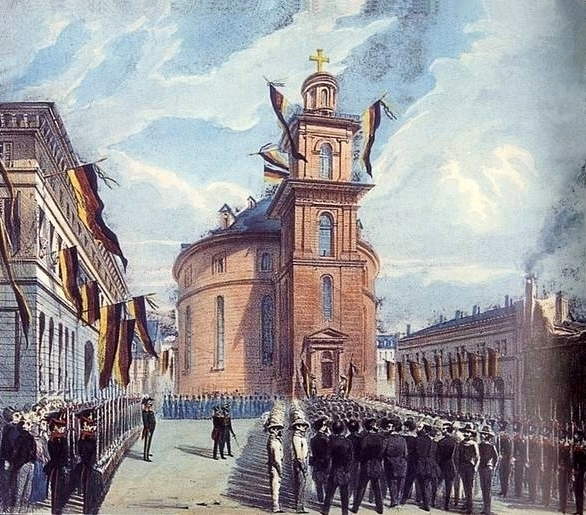
St. Paul's Church in Frankfurt, whose tower was used by the society as the city's first observatory

Another committee was formed in 1838. As early as 1829, member Franz Xaver Schnyder von Wartensee had complained that the city's clock towers were highly inaccurate. He proposed that the society itself should regulate the city's clocks. After several years of preparation, the society presented its plan to the city, which in June 1838 decided to assign the task of regulating the clocks to the society.

The Society's method involved measuring the apparent solar time using a theodolite and then calculating the mean solar time from these measurements. As a first step, the meridian had to be determined and marked. Marks were installed on buildings near the observation site to serve as reference points. Thereafter, the transit of the Sun or stars with known positions could be used to calculate the time. For these observations, the city granted the society access to the tower of St. Paul's Church.

The astronomical observations were used by members of the society to calibrate a mechanical clock. Each day, at 22 seconds before 12:00 pm, the committee rang a bell exactly twelve times; other churches were only permitted to begin ringing their bells at the twelfth strike. The city allocated an annual budget to the society for this committee, and in the following years, improvements were made to the instruments and methods used. St. Paul's Church was also employed for other astronomical observations, including the viewing of meteor showers and solar eclipses.

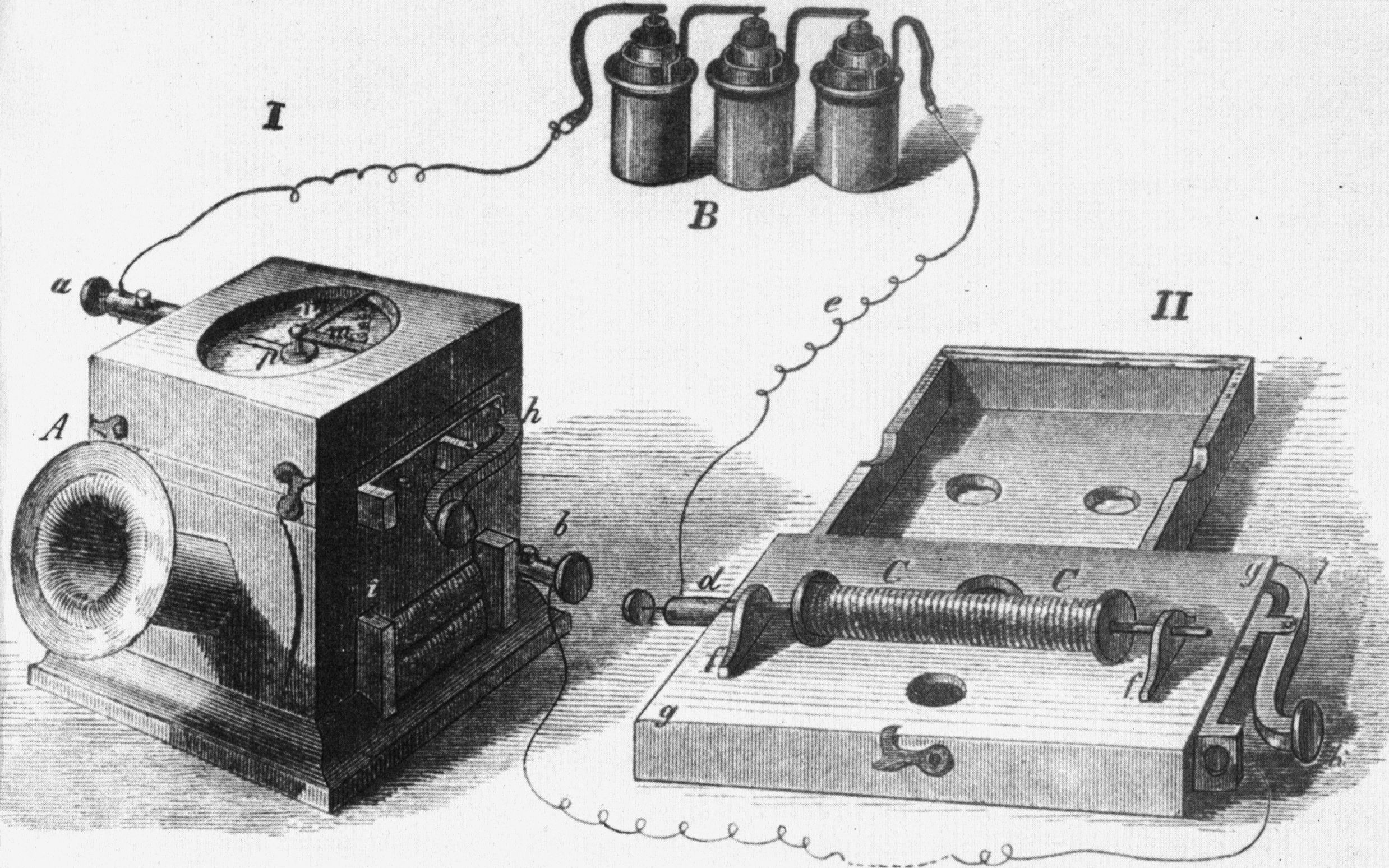
Illustration of the telephone invented by Philipp Reis as presented in Frankfurt physical society

In 1851, Johann Philipp Reis joined the society. The Gelnhausen-born inventor was living in Frankfurt at the time, completing his studies and attending lectures by Böttger. On 26 October 1861, Reis presented one of his inventions to the society, coining the term telephone. On the grounds of the Dr. Senckenberg Foundation, a 300 feet (91 m) wire was strung between two buildings. In one building, Reis spoke into his telephone while, in the lecture hall, listeners gathered around the loudspeaker while melodies were sung. While melodies could be transmitted by the telephone, spoken words were not understood by the audience The telephone was not an immediate success. Reis continued to refine his device, producing several units for sale through the shop of Fritz Albert, son of Johann Valentin Albert. After Alexander Graham Bell's telephone became more widespread in Germany and after Reis had died in 1874, the society erected a monument to Reis in Frankfurt and frequently honored him in events and publications as one of its most notable members.

In the 1860s, the society attempted to employ two lecturers: Böttger for chemistry and a second for physics. Friedrich Eisenlohr gave weekly lectures in 1860, and in the following year, Ernst Abbe was appointed as lecturer in physics. Abbe, too remained for only one year, in part because he struggled to engage the audience. Short-term appointments of educators such as Johann Joseph Oppel, Friedrich Kohlrausch, Wilhelm August Nippoldt and Georg Krebs followed. During this period, the society primarily hired younger lecturers, as the board was not confident it could afford to pay two experienced lecturers simultaneously.

=== Growth towards the end of the century ===
Following the annexation of the former Free City of Frankfurt by the Kingdom of Prussia in 1866 and the foundation of the German Empire in 1871, Frankfurt underwent rapid transformation. The sewage system was overhauled, and the first horse-drawn railways were constructed. The chemical industry remained banned within the city, as the authorities continued to oppose the establishment of factories inside the city walls. Instead, during the Gründerzeit period, industry began to thrive in neighbouring towns such as Höchst and Griesheim.

The number of members had grown significantly in the preceding years, reaching 300 in 1870 and 350 by 1880. Among the members were several emerging industrialists, including Leo Gans of Cassella, Eugen Lucius, founder of what would later become Hoechst AG, Eugen Hartmann of Hartmann & Braun, and Heinrich Roessler of Degussa. Some of the industrialists like Heinrich Roessler or Leo Gans had started their studies of physics and chemistry in the society, listening to the lectures of Böttger. These individuals were not only passive members; during the 1880s and 1890s, many of them joined the society's board.

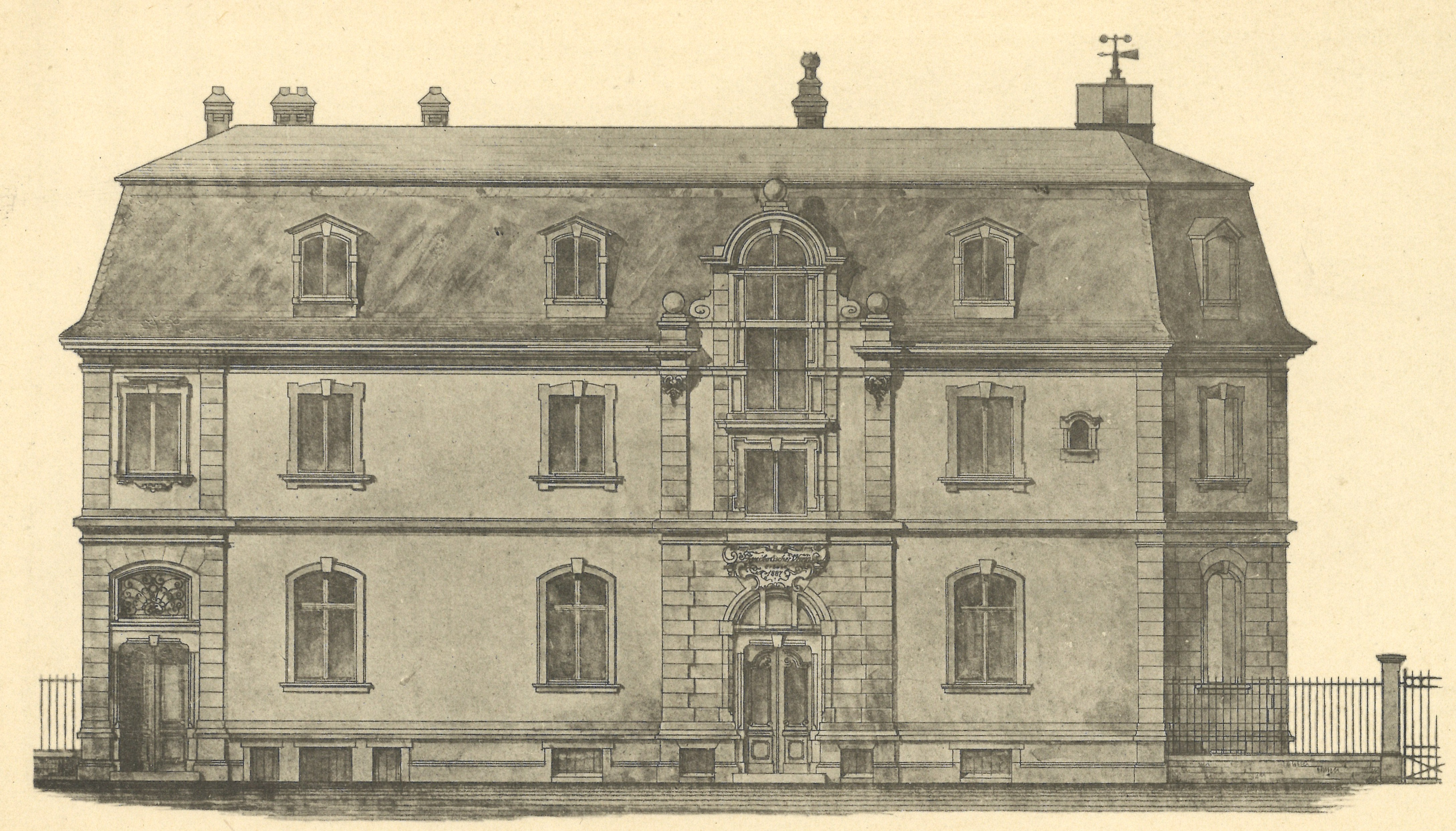
Plan of the new building from the front

Following Böttger's death in 1881, Bernhard Lepsius was appointed as lecturer in chemistry. With a new generation of lecturers, it became clear that a new building was urgently needed. Friedrich Kohlrausch later wrote of his time at the society, describing the lecture hall and laboratory as cramped "caves" where the lecturer occasionally even had to heat the oven himself. Plans for such a building had first been initiated in 1871 by board member Julius Ziegler, but failed due to a lack of funding. In 1884, the Senckenberg Society expressed interest in the Physikalischer Verein vacating the shared premises, as its natural history collection continued to grow. A new building plot on the grounds of the Dr. Senckenbergische Foundation was granted to the society as an emphyteutic lease. In response, the society presented construction plans at the members' assembly in October 1885. Donations from society members and local industry quickly reached 30,000 Marks. The remaining funds were provided from the society's reserves and a grant from the Dr. Senckenbergische Foundation. Construction of the new building began in July 1886 at Stiftsstraße 32.

During the opening ceremony of the society's first dedicated building, chairman Theodor Petersen emphasized the need for expanded facilities and scientific institutes:

In Frankfurt besteht keine Hochschule, aber es herrscht daselbst regster Sinn auch für die Naturwissenschaften und das Korn, welches Senckenberg einst säte, ist hier reichlich aufgegangen. (...) Als Senckenberg lebte, liessen sich die verschiedenen Zweige der Naturwissenschaften noch übersehen und A. v. Humboldt konnte noch ein treffliches Bild des Ganzen geben; jetzt ist Alles im Einzelnen gegliedert.

[There is no university in Frankfurt, but there is a lively interest in the natural sciences here, and the seed that Senckenberg once sowed has sprouted abundantly. (...) When Senckenberg was alive, the various branches of the natural sciences could still be grasped as a whole, and Alexander von Humboldt was still able to present an excellent picture of the field; now everything is organised in detail.]

— Theodor Petersen, Jahresbericht des Physikalischen Vereins zu Frankfurt am Main für das Rechnungsjahr 1886–1887

Only one year later, chairman Heinrich Roessler proposed the society should expand its focus with the foundation of a school and research institute for electrical engineering. Josef Epstein was appointed as lecturer in electrical engineering, and an assistant was hired. Donations quickly reached 20,500 Marks, with Eugen Hartmann and his company Hartmann & Braun contributing many of the necessary instruments. The vocational education school opened on 24 April 1889. Of the first 13 students, 11 came to Frankfurt from as far away as Berlin and Switzerland, while only two were local. Students were required to take ten compulsory subjects—including lighting technology, telegraphy, and telephony, alongside minor subjects such as chemistry and technical drawing. Lecturers were drawn both from the society and from local industry. The school was funded partly by the government and partly through tuition fees and donations. Some sources state that the Elektrotechnische Lehr- und Untersuchungs-Anstalt was the first school in Germany or even the world to focus specifically on electrical engineering.

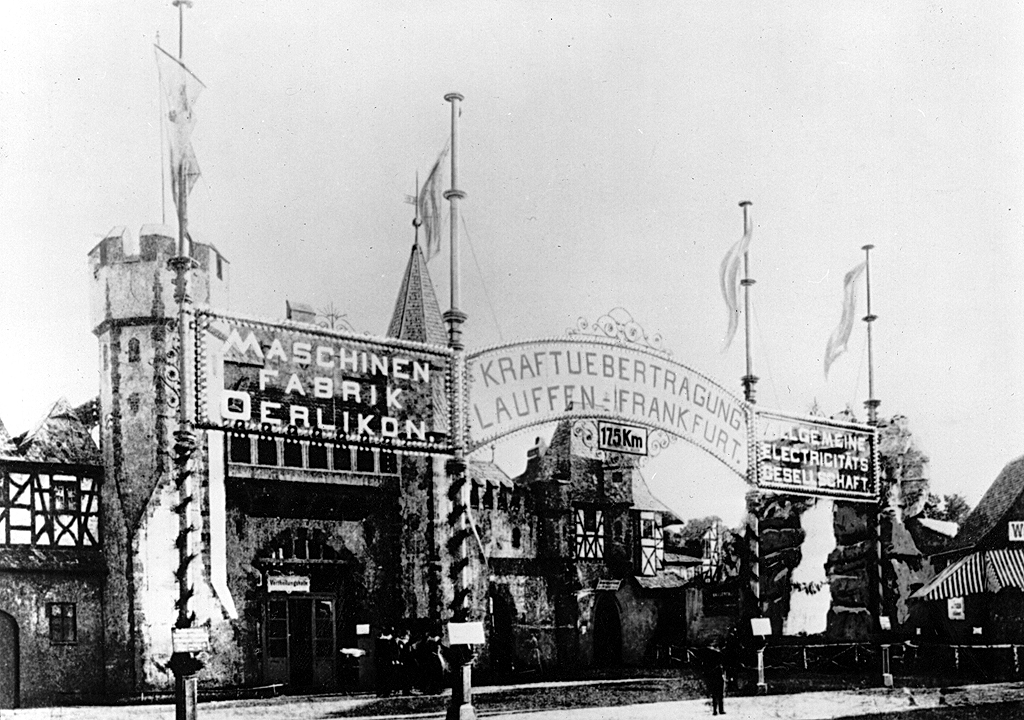
Entrance to the International Electrotechnical Exhibition in 1891

During this period, Leopold Sonnemann, a member of the society since 1849, proposed hosting an International Electrotechnical Exhibition in Frankfurt. The planning committee of the exhibition and the Physikalischer Verein shared several key individuals, including the society's lecturer for electrical engineering, Josef Epstein, and board member Eugen Hartmann. When the exhibition opened in 1891, the society participated by displaying busts of its members Philipp Reis and Samuel Thomas von Sömmerring alongside their inventions; the telephone and electrical telegraph. Students from the society's electrical engineering school presented their projects in an effort to attract new students. Lectures were also offered in the society's new building. The busts of Reis and Sömmerring were presented again in the 1893 World's Columbian Exposition.

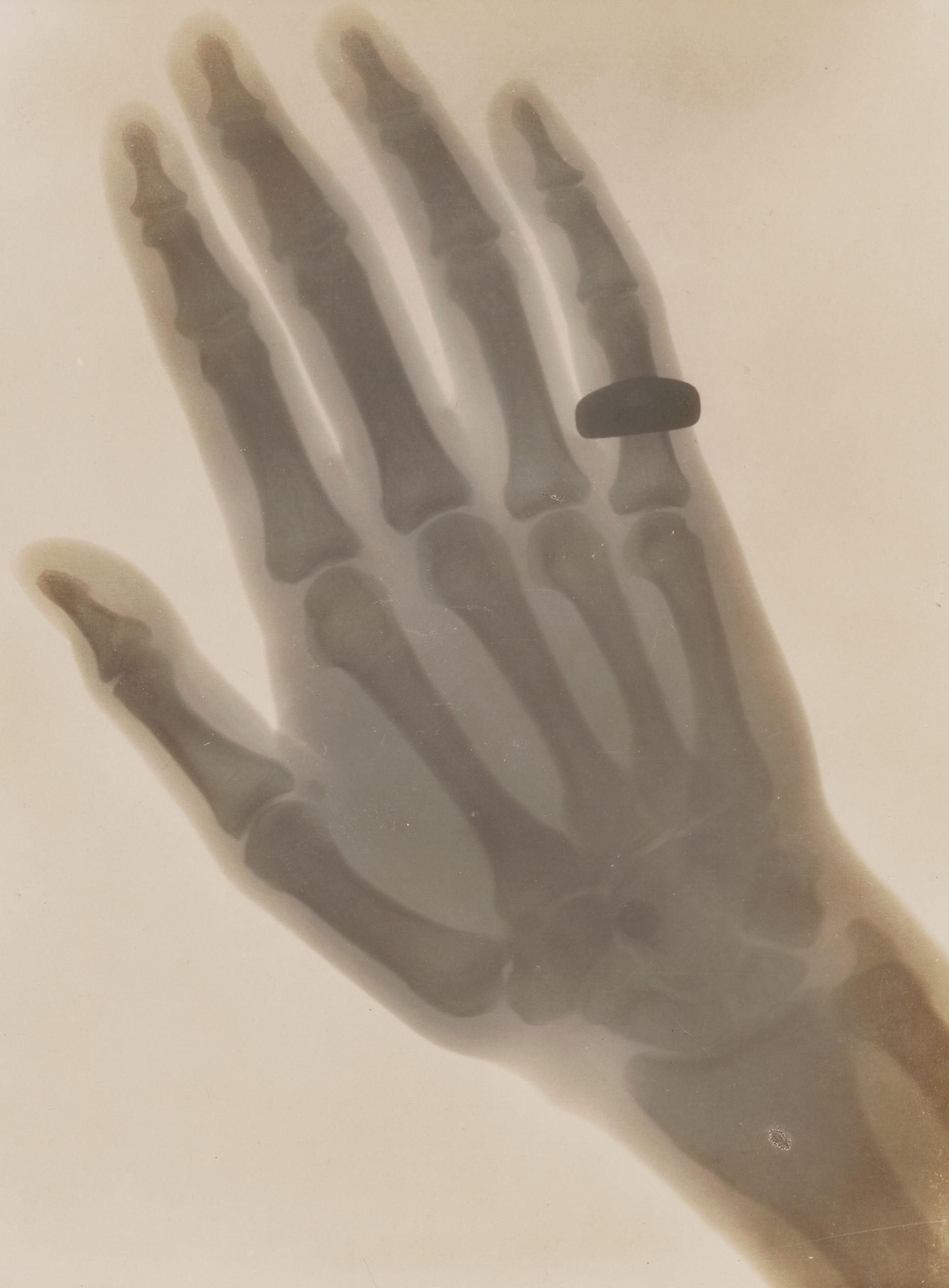
X-ray of the hand of a man, showing a bullet lodged in the wrist

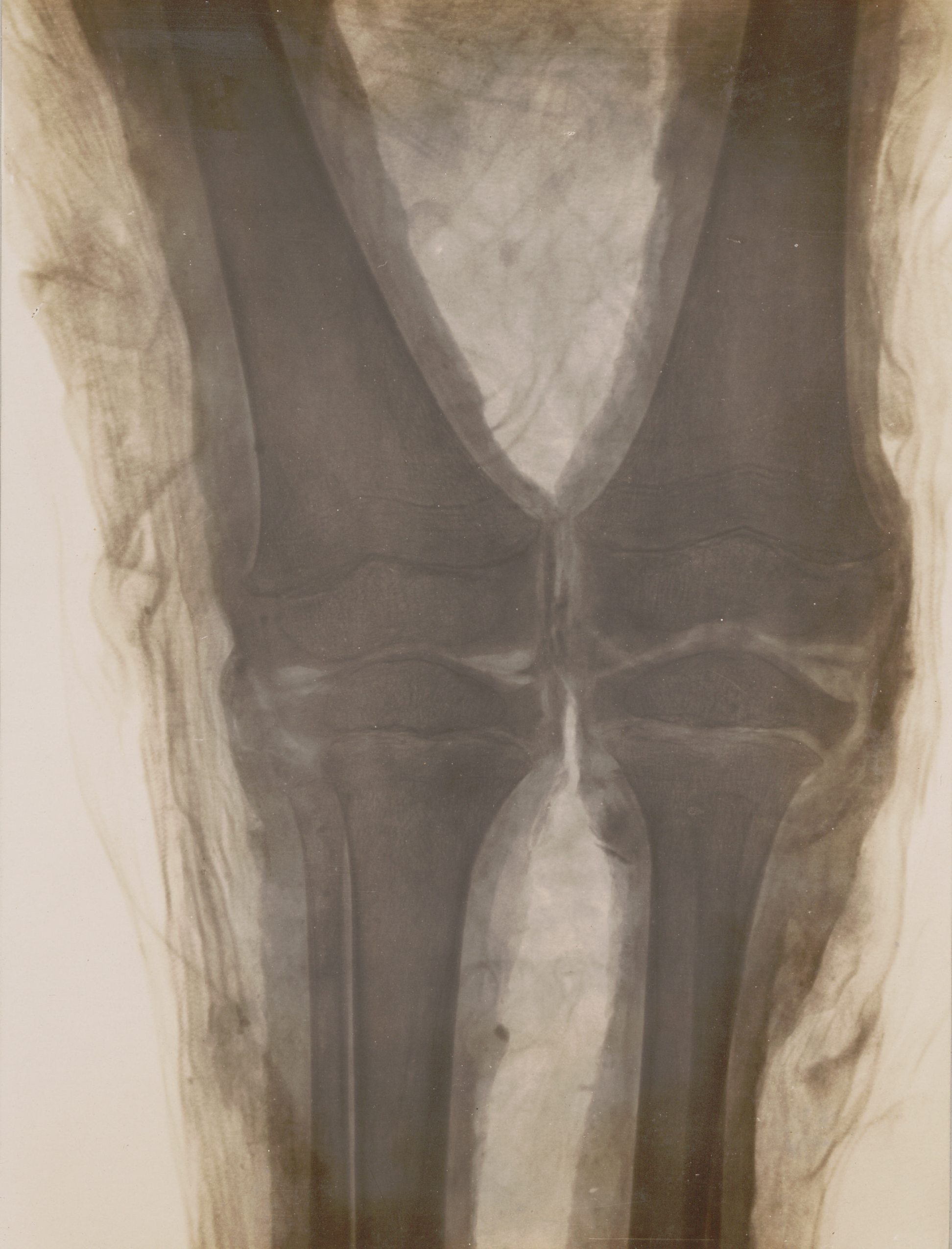
First x-ray of a mummy, showing the knees of an egyptian child

Following the discovery of x-rays by Wilhelm Röntgen, announced on 28 December 1895, a news report in the Frankfurter Zeitung on 7 January 1896 alerted Walter König to the breakthrough. König had been employed as head of the physical department since 1892, succeeding Georg Krebs, who had transferred to the electrical engineering school. On 10 January 1896, König wrote to Röntgen requesting a visit in Würzburg. After inspecting the device in Würzburg, König constructed his own device for producing x-rays. The society began offering medical x-ray services to local doctors starting on 29 January 1896. Among the first images König produced was the earliest known x-ray image of an Egyptian mummy. He sent a collection of these images to Röntgen, who replied that they were "the best I have ever come across." A total of 54,900 Marks was donated for equipping the laboratory with technical apparatus, with the largest contributions coming from Wilhelm Carl von Rothschild, Leo Gans, Wilhelm Merton, and Georg Speyer.

For a fee of six to fifteen Marks, patients could receive an x-ray, initially at the society's facility on Stiftstraße. However, due to increasing demand and limited space, the x-ray laboratory was relocated to the nearby Bürgerhospital in 1897. The society performed 50 x-ray examinations in its first year of operation, 225 in the second year, and 528 by 1899. In 1900, Hermann Theodor Simon succeeded König as head of the physics department and shifted its focus away from x-ray research. In 1906, the x-ray laboratory was officially integrated into the electrical engineering school.

By 1900, the number of members had risen to 620, and the society's annual budget had grown to 54,000 Marks—up from 22,000 Marks in 1880. At that time, seven staff members were employed by the society. Between 350 and 390 student lecture tickets were issued each semester, and up to 54 individuals used the society's laboratories per term. Students from nearby universities were also able to conduct dissertation research at the society. The collection of meteorological data continued, supported by volunteers and overseen by König, who also produced weather forecasts. Data from as many as 37 locations were gathered and analyzed, with weather reports sent, for example, to the United States Department of War, Washington, D.C. Astronomical time determinations were still carried out, with the observatory remaining at St. Paul's Church.

=== Plans for a new building ===
Space once again became an issue in the society's facilities in 1893, as the electrical engineering school and institute, along with the collection of physical instruments, had expanded significantly. In 1895, the building underwent renovation, and several rooms were refitted and modernized. In 1898, a committee was established consisting of Eugen Hartmann, Julius Ziegler, and architect Franz von Hoven to plan an expansion of the building.

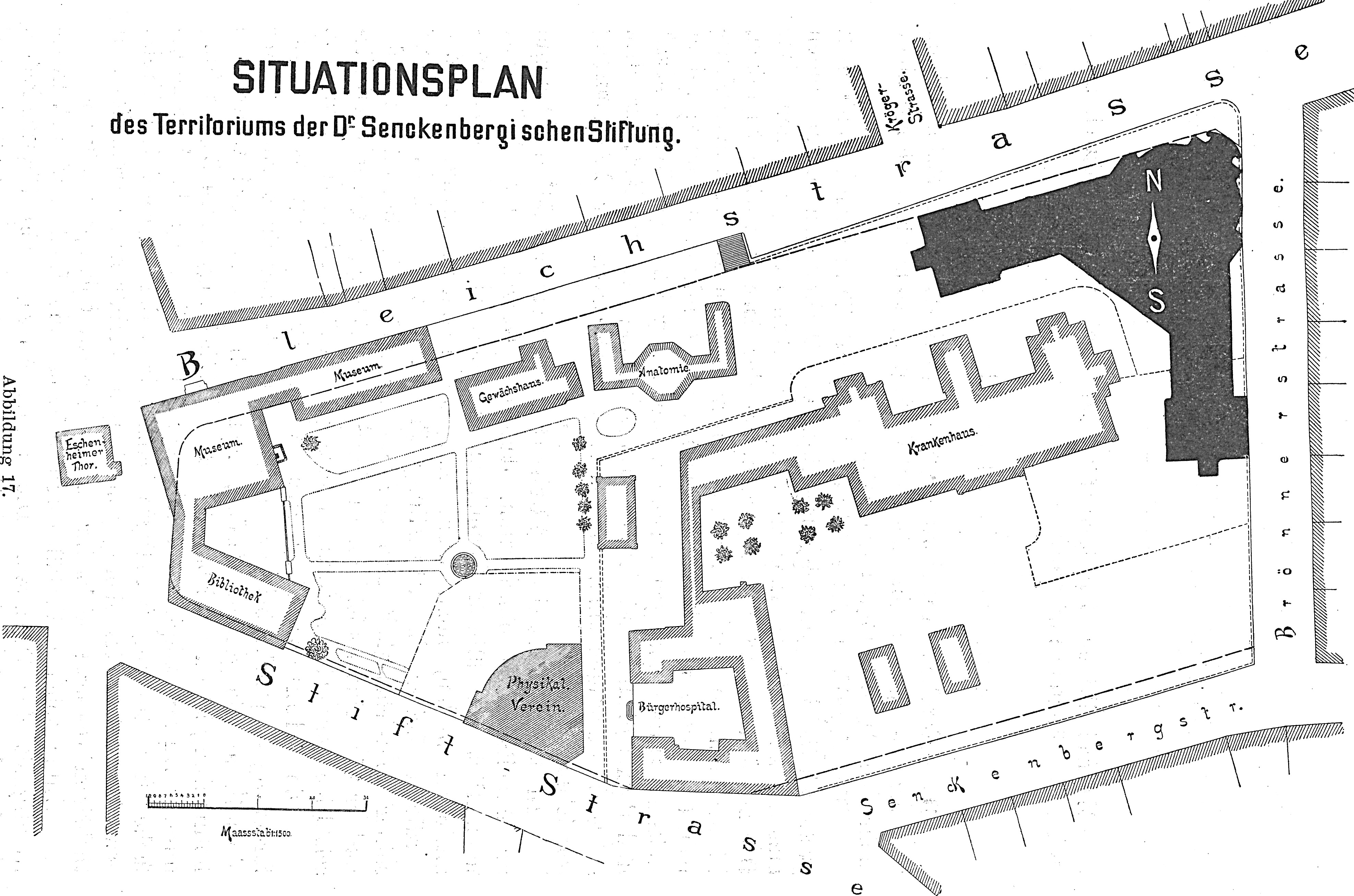
Map of the grounds of Dr. Senckenbergische Foundation, the 1887 constructed building of the society in gray to the lower left, the newly proposed building in black to the upper right

That same year, proposals for an electric tram line through Stiftstraße raised concerns that vibrations or electrical interference could affect scientific experiments. As a result, the committee was also tasked with exploring relocation options. The committee ultimately proposed the construction of a new building, estimating the required funding at 360,000 Marks. At a members’ assembly on 22 June 1899, it was decided to sell the existing building to the Dr. Senckenbergische Foundation and to construct a new facility at Brönner-/Bleichstraße, still on the grounds of Dr. Senckenbergische Foundation and only 150 metres (490 ft) away from the old building.

The committee compiled a list of requirements for the new building, which included a main lecture hall for 250 to 300 people, three additional lecture halls for 60 to 80 attendees each (to serve the society's various departments), training rooms and laboratories, workshops, a machine room, collection rooms, as well as meteorological and astronomical observatories. Franz von Hoven presented his architectural plans to the board in 1899. After an initial revision, a competing design was submitted by architect Richard Dielmann, who argued that a scientific institution such as the Physikalischer Verein required a more monumental and representative design. The society acquired Dielmann's proposal and incorporated elements of it into von Hoven's design.

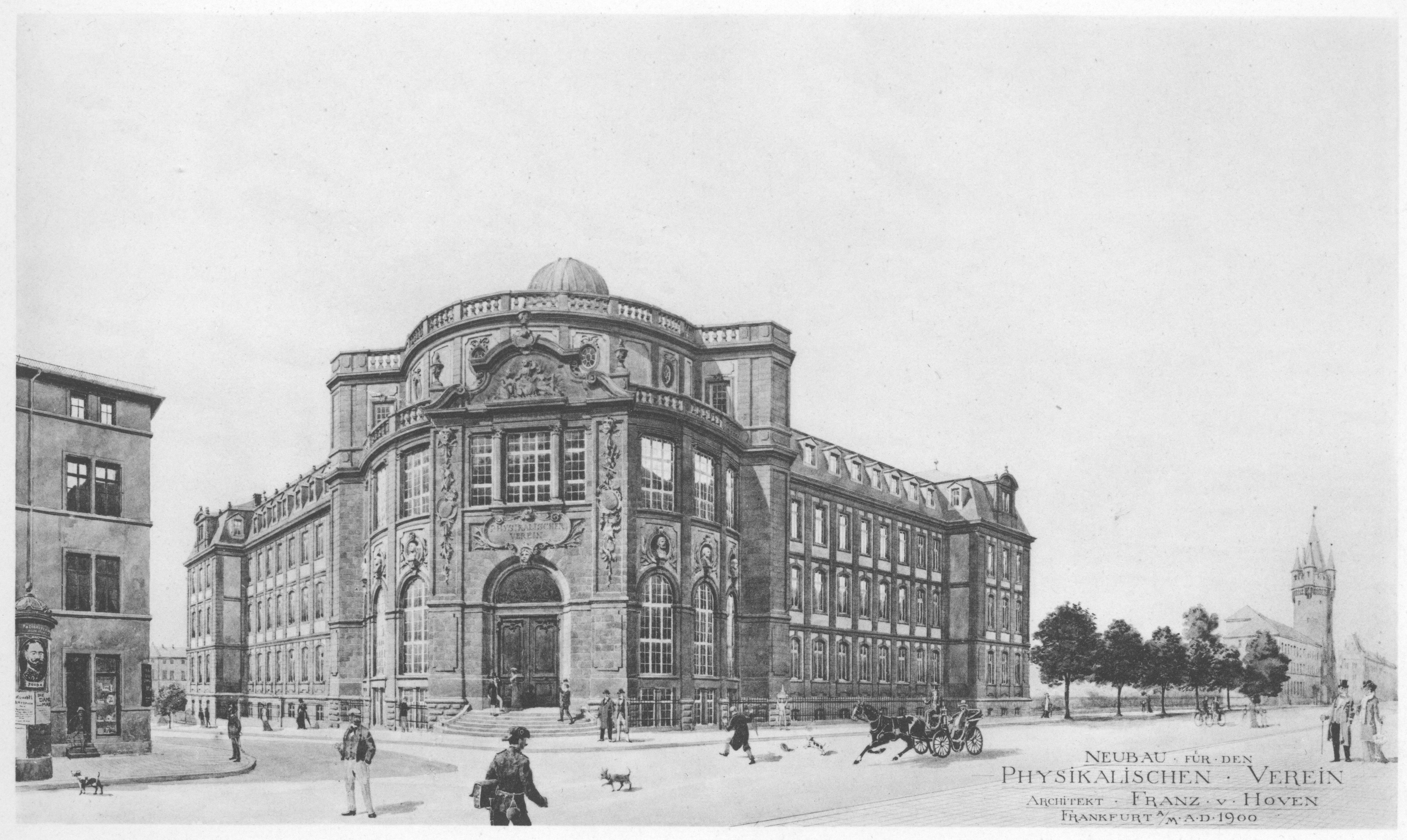
Design by Franz von Hoven

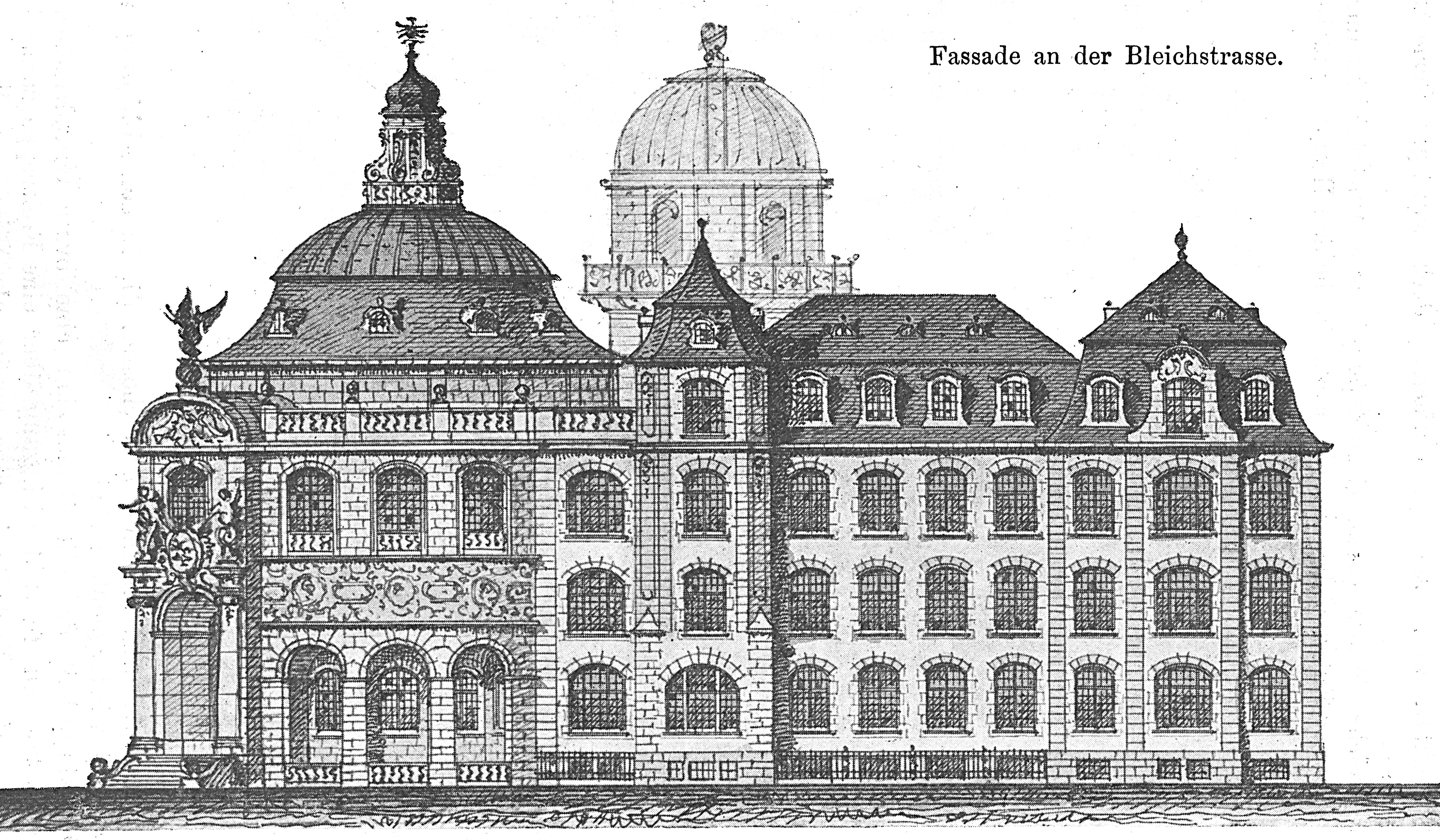
Design by Richard Dielmann

Construction of the new building was delayed for several years as the Dr. Senckenbergische Foundation entered negotiations with the city to exchange building sites. The city was interested in acquiring the foundation's centrally located property and, in return, offered new grounds near the Bockenheimer Warte, where the new fairgrounds, including the Festhalle Frankfurt, would later be developed. Negotiations concluded in 1903, and on 21 February 1903, the members’ assembly of the society agreed to relocate to the new site on Viktoria-Allee. On the same day, the Senckenberg Society likewise agreed to construct its new museum on the same grounds.

New architectural plans had to be drawn up by Franz von Hoven, who incorporated large parts of the original design into the new site's geometry. The construction contract was awarded to the building company Schaffner & Albert – Albert being a grandchild of Johann Valentin Albert. Construction work began on 1 May 1905, even though full funding had not yet been secured. Groundwater was encountered at a shallow depth, significantly increasing construction costs beyond the original estimates. Excluding the observatory dome, construction was completed on 15 February 1906. The building was inaugurated on 13 May 1906. The construction cost had risen to 1.5 million Marks, with donations covering more than 1 million Marks

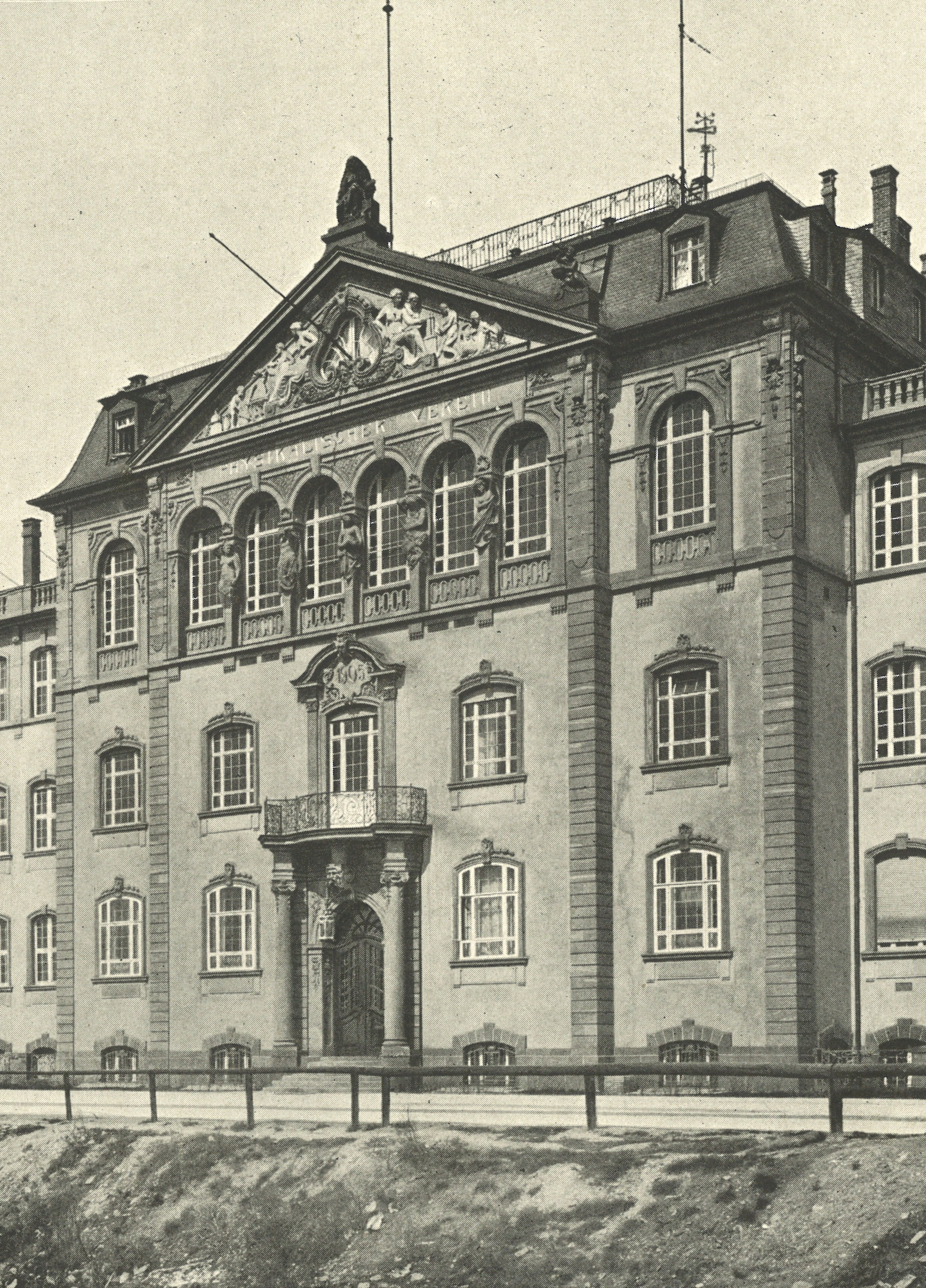
Avant-corps of the new building

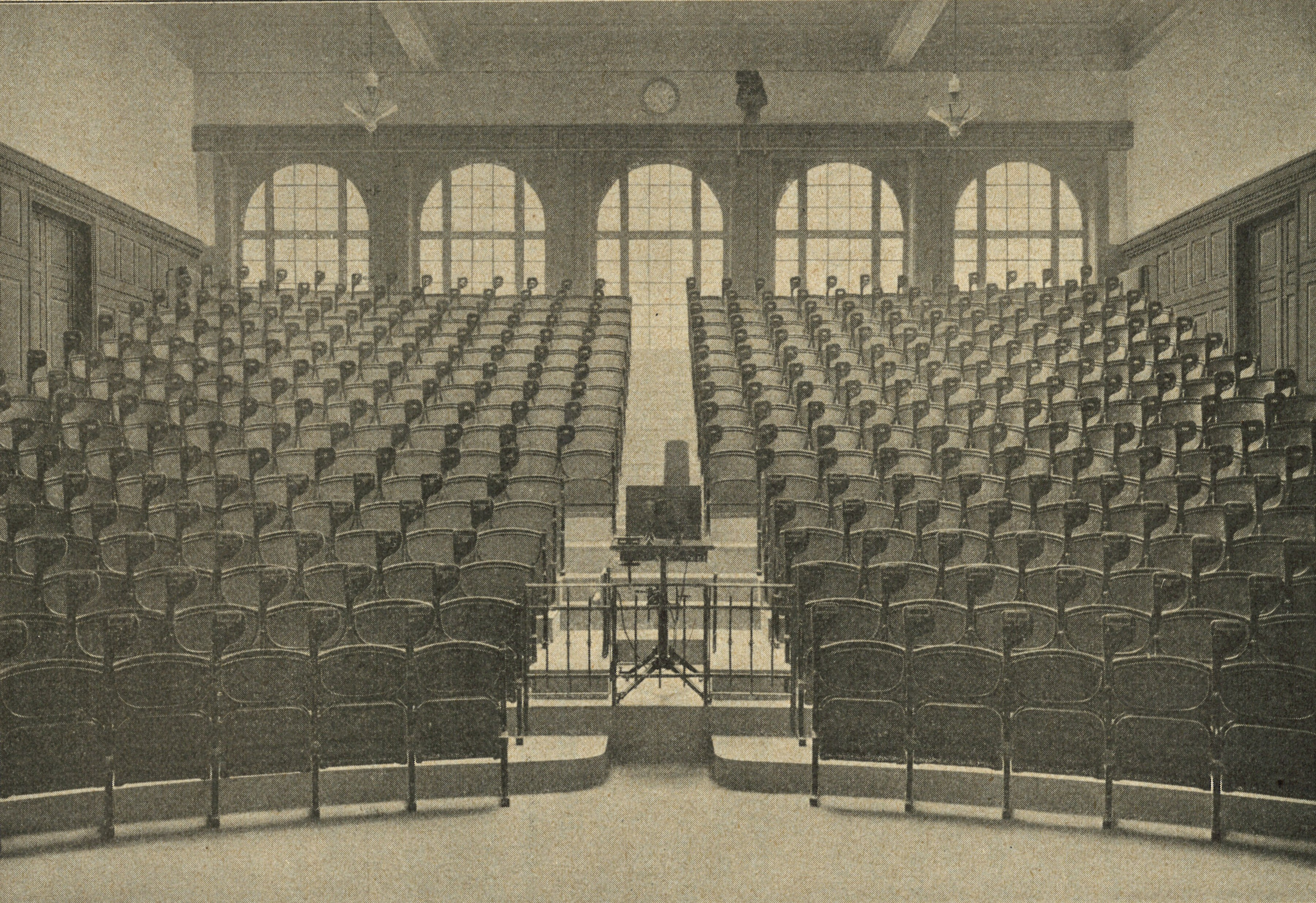
Large lecture hall

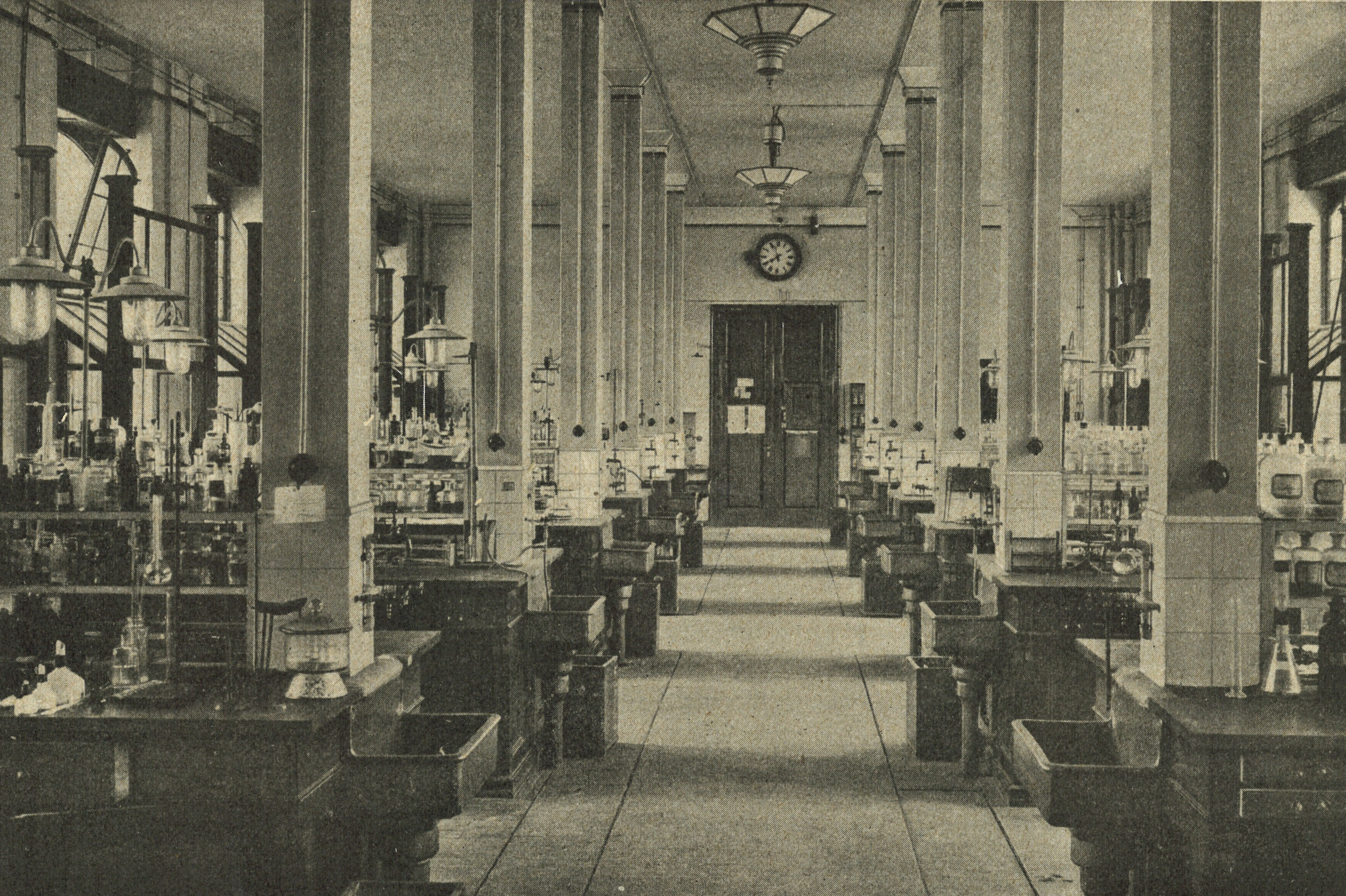
Main chemical laboratory

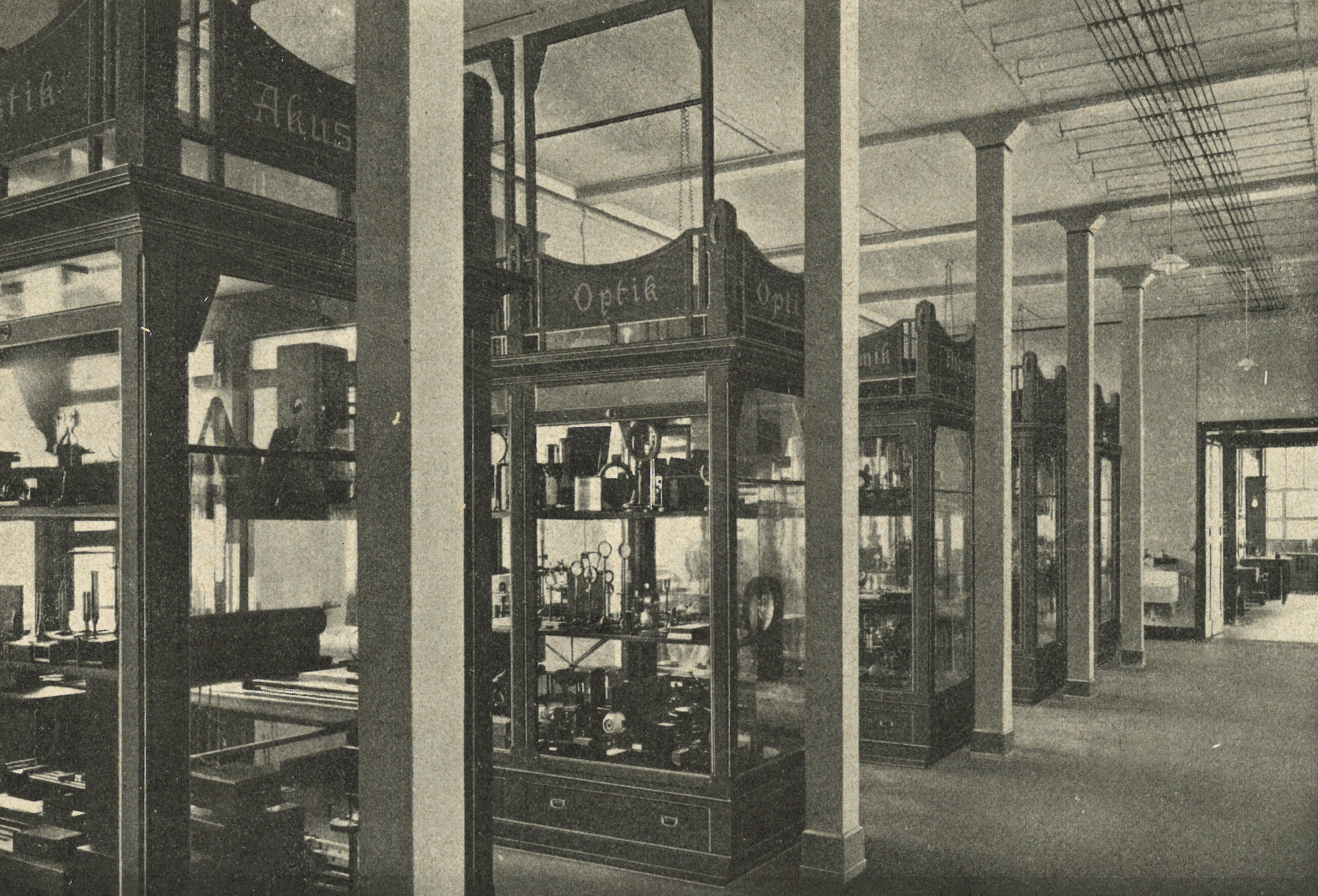
Collection room of the physics department

During the inauguration of the building chairman Eugen Hartmann outlined the society's vision for the coming years: the three departments – physics, chemistry and electrical engineering – were to be developed into academic institutes. A second chair in physics was proposed, focusing on cosmological physics. The meteorological committee was to be expanded using the latest flight technologies, from weather balloons to crewed aircraft, with the goal of measuring phenomena such as atmospheric electricity. A seismological observatory was to be established. In the field of chemistry, a new chair in physical chemistry was envisioned. The department for electrical engineering was to evolve into an institute for applied physics.

=== Expansion of the institutes ===
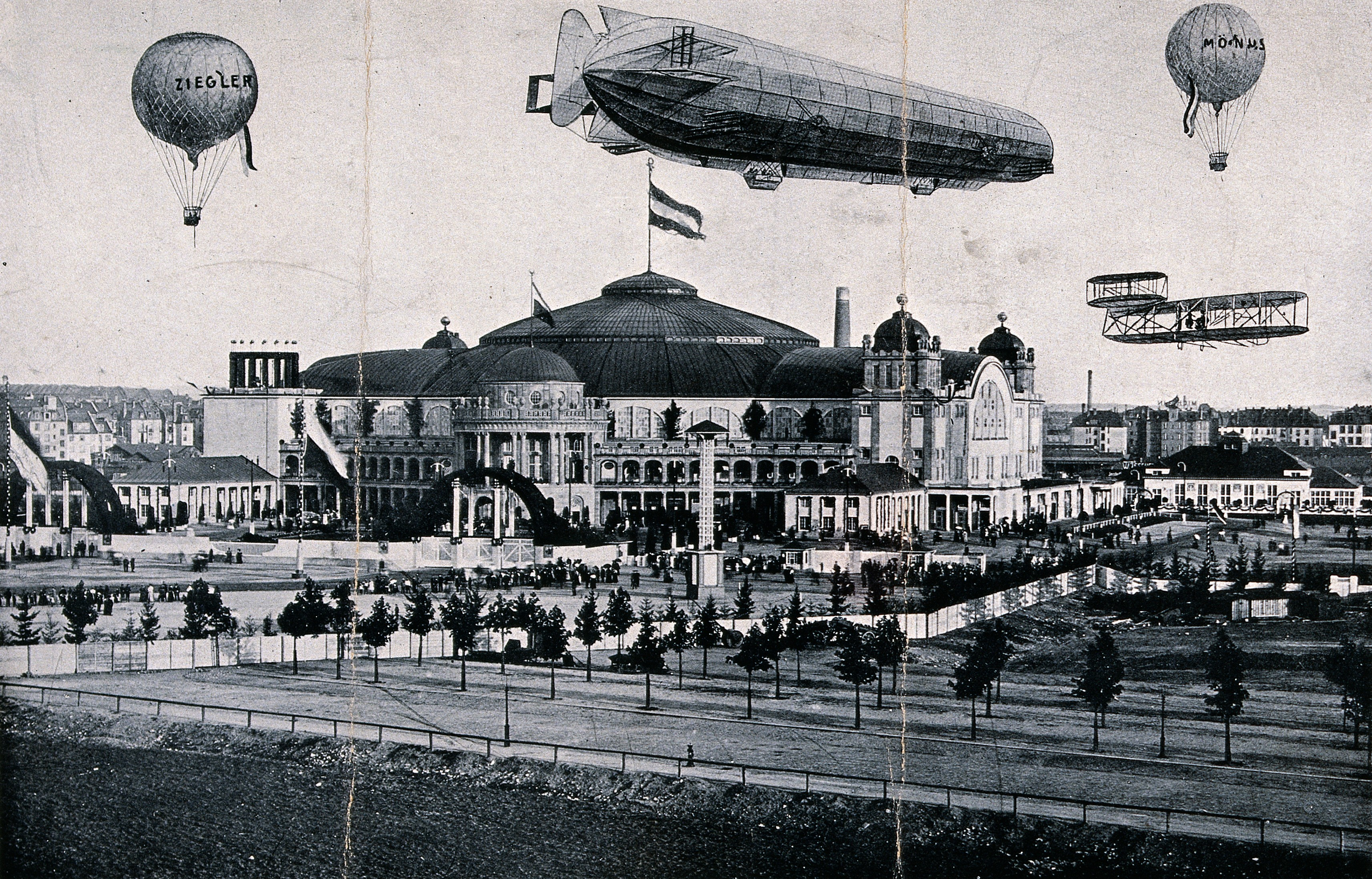
Weather balloon "Ziegler" (to the left) during the ILA of 1909

In 1906 the meteorological committee was reorganised into an Institute for Meteorology and Geophysics. Kurt Wegener was appointed as the first director of the institute in 1907. The institute acquired a weather balloon called "Ziegler", which was used to collect meteorological data. Franz Linke succeeded Wegener as director in 1908. The first International Aviation Exhibition was held in Frankfurt in 1909. For the event, Franz Linke organised the world's first aviation weather service. By collecting data within a radius of 200 kilometres (120 mi), the Society was able to make forecasts on wind conditions, turbulence, and cloud cover.

The meteorological department became part of the North German Weather Service, the first inter-state weather service in Germany. From that point onward, the department was responsible for providing weather forecasts for the Grand Duchy of Hesse and other districts within the Province of Hesse-Nassau. Meteorological data from 87 stations across Germany was collected and used to produce reports, forecasts and weather maps, which were then sold to newspapers.

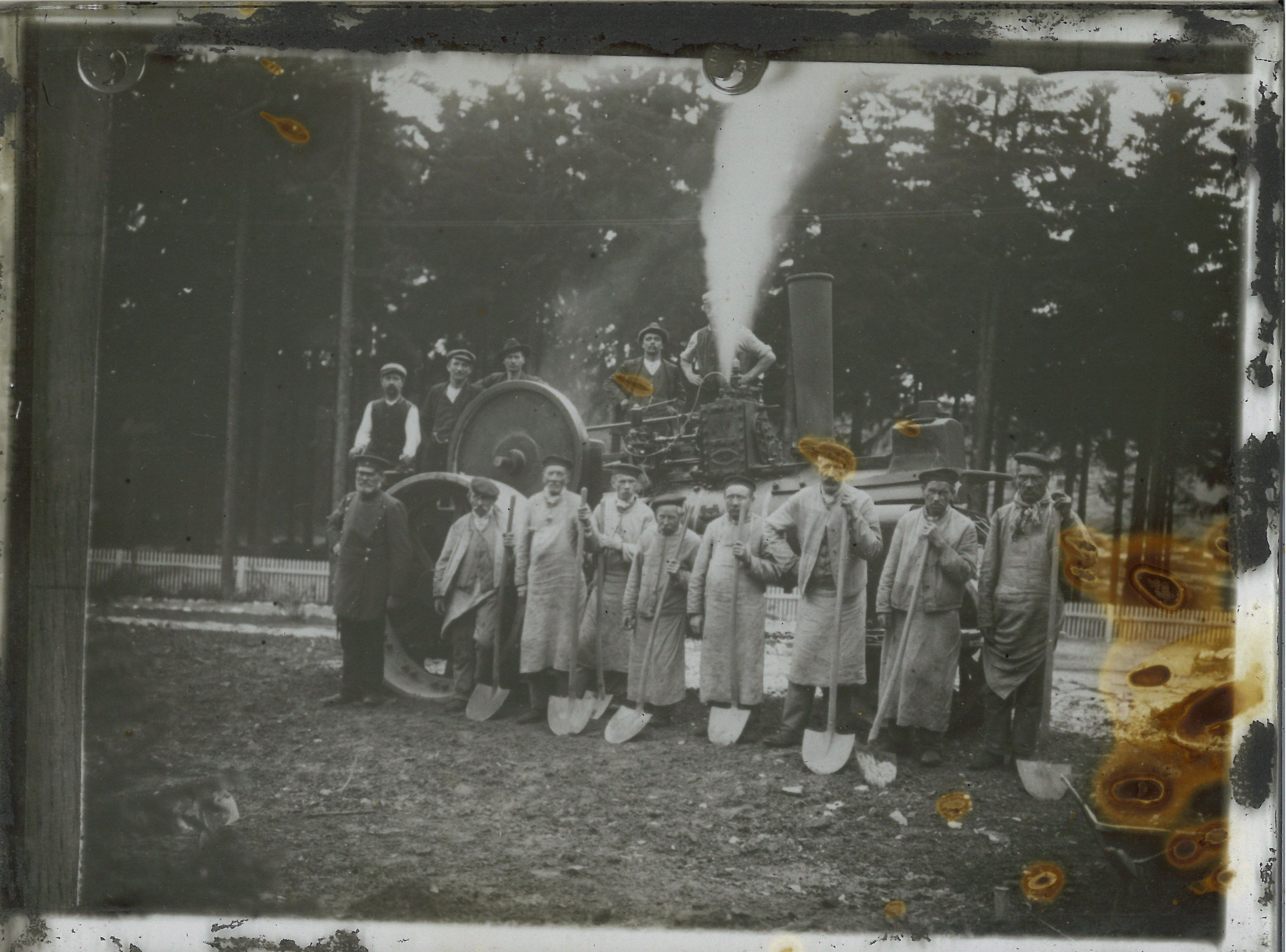
Construction workers at Taunus-Observatory

A donation from Baroness Antonie von Reinach, wife of geologist Albert von Reinach, enabled the society to establish a meteorological and geophysical research observatory, the Taunus-Observatory, located on the Kleiner Feldberg in the Taunus mountain range near Frankfurt. Construction began in early 1911, with support from aviation pioneers like DELAG and Ferdinand von Zeppelin, who contributed through financial donations.

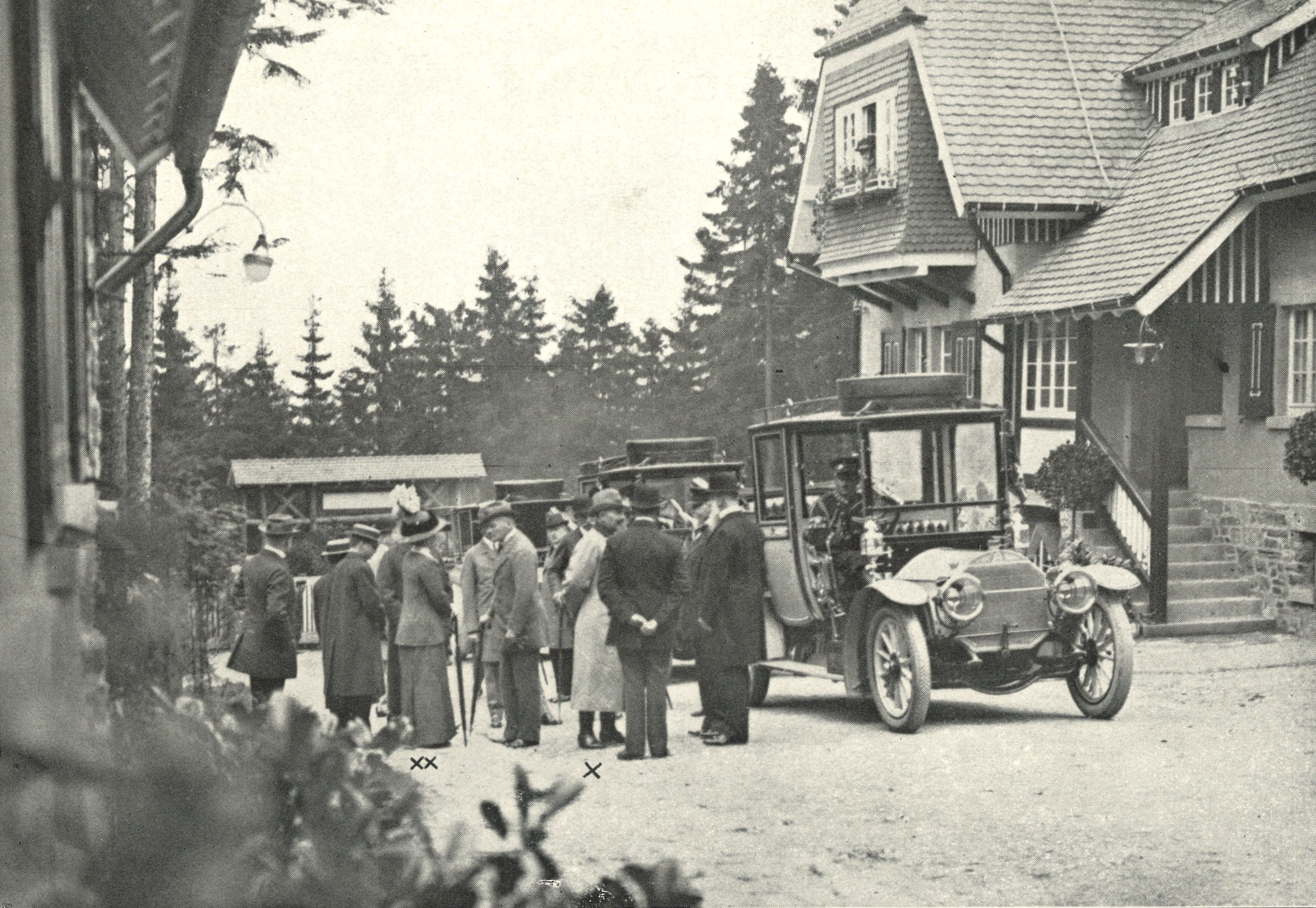
Wilhelm II visiting the observatory with his sister in 1913

The first phase of construction, beginning in 1911, included the gatehouse, a residence for assistants and grounds keeper, and the seismological station, named after von Reinach. Additional meteorological measuring stations were distributed throughout the area of the observatory. Early infrastructure provided telephone, electricity, and water supply to the researchers, who had to live at the observatory in order to collect data. A 500 metres (1,600 ft) narrow-gauge track with a motorized winch was installed to facilitate the launch and retrieval of kites and weather balloons. The observatory was further expanded in the following years, including the addition of a prefabricated house in Swedish design intended in part for receptions. The observatory officially opened in 1913, marked by a visit from Wilhelm II and his sister Princess Margaret of Prussia, on 19 August of that year.

The astronomical department was also expanded. An astronomical observatory was included in the society's new building, and Martin Brendel was appointed as the first director of the astronomical department. Brendel used a refractor telescope in the observatory, featuring a 21 centimetres (8.3 in) objective handcrafted by Max Pauly (optician). The observatory was used to observe and photograph Halley's Comet in 1909, and further research focused on binary stars and the surface of Mars. However, due to its location near the centre of Frankfurt, where conditions for optical astronomy were not ideal, Brendel increasingly turned to theoretical research. He proposed establishing a dedicated institute in Frankfurt for calculating the orbital parameters of minor planets. Brendel had developed a new computational method that soon proved to be superior to existing approaches. In 1913 representatives from Sorbonne University, the Royal Observatory of Belgium and the Royal Observatory of Bucharest came to Frankfurt to study his method. With the support of Frankfurt's mayor, Georg Voigt, the Planeten-Institut, an International Institute for Minor Planets, was founded in that same year. Between 1913 and 1915, orbital parameters for 100 minor planets were calculated at the institute.

A new department for physical chemistry and metallurgy was established in 1910, with Richard Lorenz appointed as its head. The department focused on metallographic research and was equipped with a dedicated darkroom. By this time, the society employed a growing roster of specialists, with the heads of the departments being: Richard Wachsmuth (physics), Martin Brendel (astronomy), Martin Freund (chemistry), Carl Déguisne (electrical engineering), Franz Linke (meteorology) and Richard Lorenz (metallurgy).

=== Founding of Frankfurt university ===
In 1901, the Akademie für Sozial- und Handelswissenschaften was established in Frankfurt as an academy for economics, modern languages, and trade skills. Students at the academy were able to attend lectures given by the Vereins lecturers. Martin Freund was appointed professor of chemistry at the academy while retaining his position as a lecturer of the society. After the Physical Society relocated to its new building near the academy in the mid-1900s, a formal agreement was signed making the society's lecturers lecturers at the academy. As part of this arrangement, lecture halls, laboratories and equipment of the society were now available to academy students, and Freund, Wachsmuth, and Déguisne were officially employed by the academy as well as the Physical Society.

The founder of the academy was Wilhelm Merton, who also championed the establishment of a university in Frankfurt. He was supported in his effort by Frankfurt's mayor Franz Adickes. In 1910, Adickes asked the Physical Society to estimate the financial requirements needed to transform the society into a university faculty. The Physical Society projected an investment of approximately 200,000 Marks, with annual operating cost of 45,000 Marks. In September 1912, a preliminary agreement was signed by the Society to participate in the foundation of a university. The university was officially established in June 1914, with Leo Gans and Paul Fulda signing on behalf of the society.

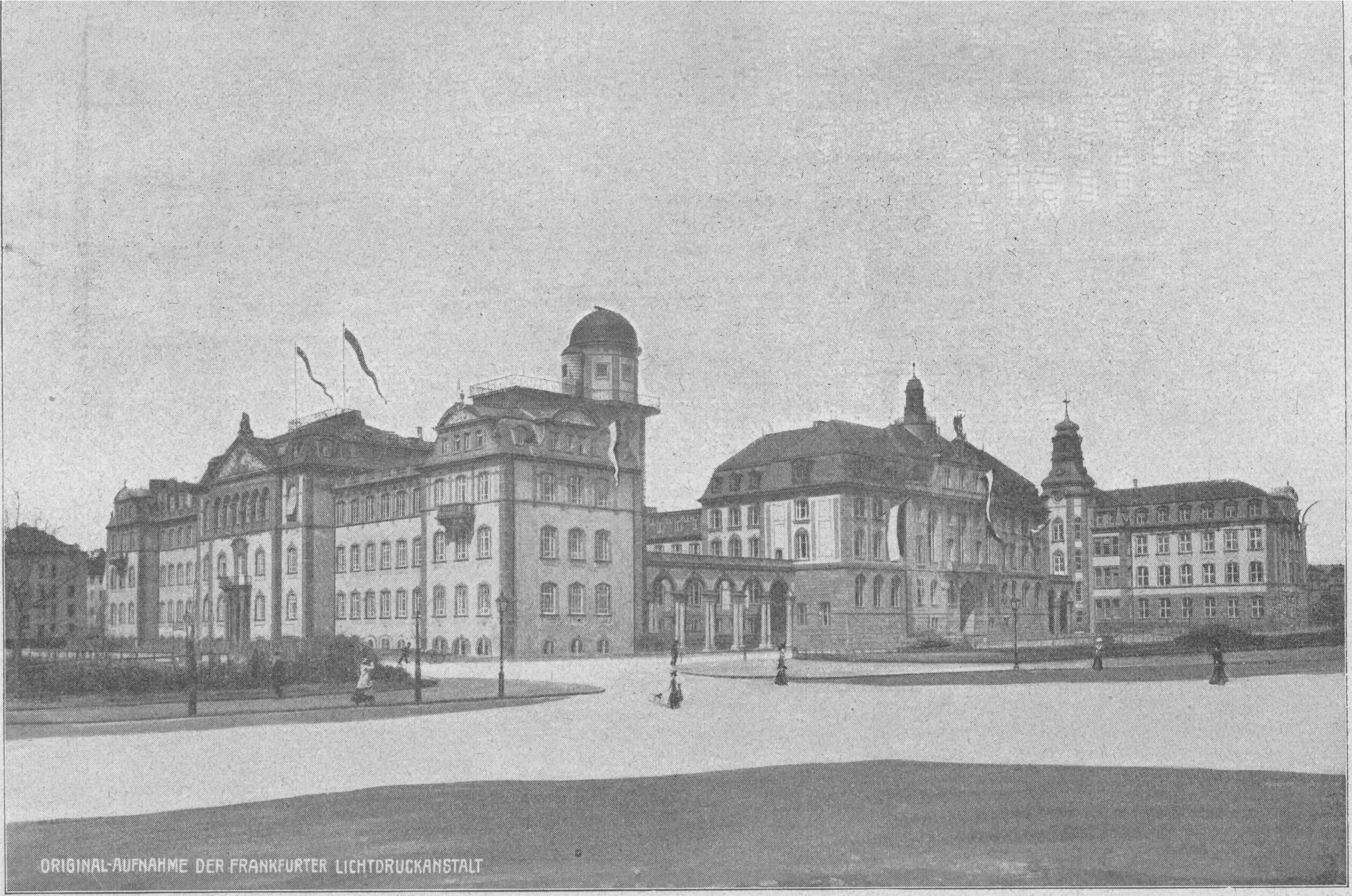
From left to right: Buildings of the Physical Society, of the Senckenberg Society and the shared library. Starting in 1914, the buildings were used by the new university

According to the founding agreement, the society made its departments available to the new university, turning them into institutes for physics, chemistry, applied physics (formerly electrical engineering), meteorology and geophysics, astronomy, physical chemistry, and metallurgy. A new Institute for Theoretical Physics was founded as well, bringing the number of institutes to seven. All institutes remained under the management of the society, which also continued to provide rooms and materials. In recognition of this extraordinary contribution, the Prussian Department of Education appointed Richard Wachsmuth as the first rector of the university. Appointments of professors were made by the Prussian ministry; professors were employed at and paid by the university. The Frankfurt Physical Society was, however, able to nominate and veto candidates. The university's professors were also employed as lecturers of the society with part-time contracts.

In July 1914, World War I started. By 1915, out of the 1,005 members of the society, 108 were conscripted or otherwise involved in the war. Conscription limited the work at the institutes, as many researchers and students were away. The electrical engineering school had to close because most students and two teachers were conscripted. At the Institute of Minor Planets, a Russian physicist sent from Pulkovo Observatory had to stop his work; cooperation with French institutes ceased as well. The institute's director, Martin Brendel, was held captive as a prisoner of war in France. The Institute for Meteorology and Geophysics had to stop publishing weather reports, while the Taunus Observatory was leased to the Imperial German Army. Up to seven soldiers were stationed there under the command of Franz Linke.

The contract for establishing the university stipulated that a new building for the department of chemistry was to be constructed. Construction started in May 1914 but was slowed down due to the war; it was eventually opened in 1919. While the construction had been planned by the society, it had to be financed by the university. At the newly founded Institute for Theoretical Physics, Max von Laue was appointed as the first director, followed by Max Born; both were also employed as lecturers at the society.

At the Institute for Physics, Max Seddig was involved in war-related research, specifically studying stereoscopy for the Imperial German Navy. At the Institute for Physical Chemistry, Richard Lorenz held a series of lectures for soldiers in Romania about the German chemical industry, emphasizing that it was able to produce many substitute materials during the war. Starting in 1916, lectures for members of the society had to be canceled because, due to a lack of fuel, the lecture halls could no longer be heated in the evenings. In 1915, Minna Lang was appointed as an assistant at the Institute for Physics, substituting for a male assistant who had been called up for military service. In 1917, she became the first woman to earn a PhD in physics in Frankfurt.

=== Transfer of tasks to the university ===
In the final years of World War I and at the beginning of the Weimar Republic, Physikalischer Verein had to contend with a shrinking number of members, financial difficulties, and the deaths of many dedicated members, such as chairman Theodor Petersen (†1918), lecturer Martin Freund (†1920), and philanthropists like Herbert von Meister (†1919). Hyperinflation in the Weimar Republic also brought severe financial strain to the society. The budget of the society was 161,000 Marks in 1919, 12,000,000 Marks in 1922, and 1.8 quadrillion Marks in 1923. To secure the operation of the university amid the society's financial troubles, the contract with the university was amended in 1922. Assistants were no longer employed by the society; instead, they worked directly for the university. In 1924, the university also took over the administration and bookkeeping of the institutes.

Following World War I, the university proposed operating the newly constructed building of the Institute of Chemistry itself, without the involvement of the society—a proposal that the members' assembly accepted in 1919. For the Taunus Observatory, a friends' association was founded by Leo Gans in 1921, while a benefit concert brought in much-needed funds. The Planeten-Institut had its budget cut by the city, and in 1921, Martin Brendel feared that the institute's work would come to an end. He argued that, for patriotic reasons, this work should not be left to France; consequently, the institute continued to be financed by private funds for the time being. In 1923, regulation of the city's clocks was taken over by the city. Starting in January 1924, the electrotechnical school was outsourced to a newly founded organisation, funded by public sources as well as donations.

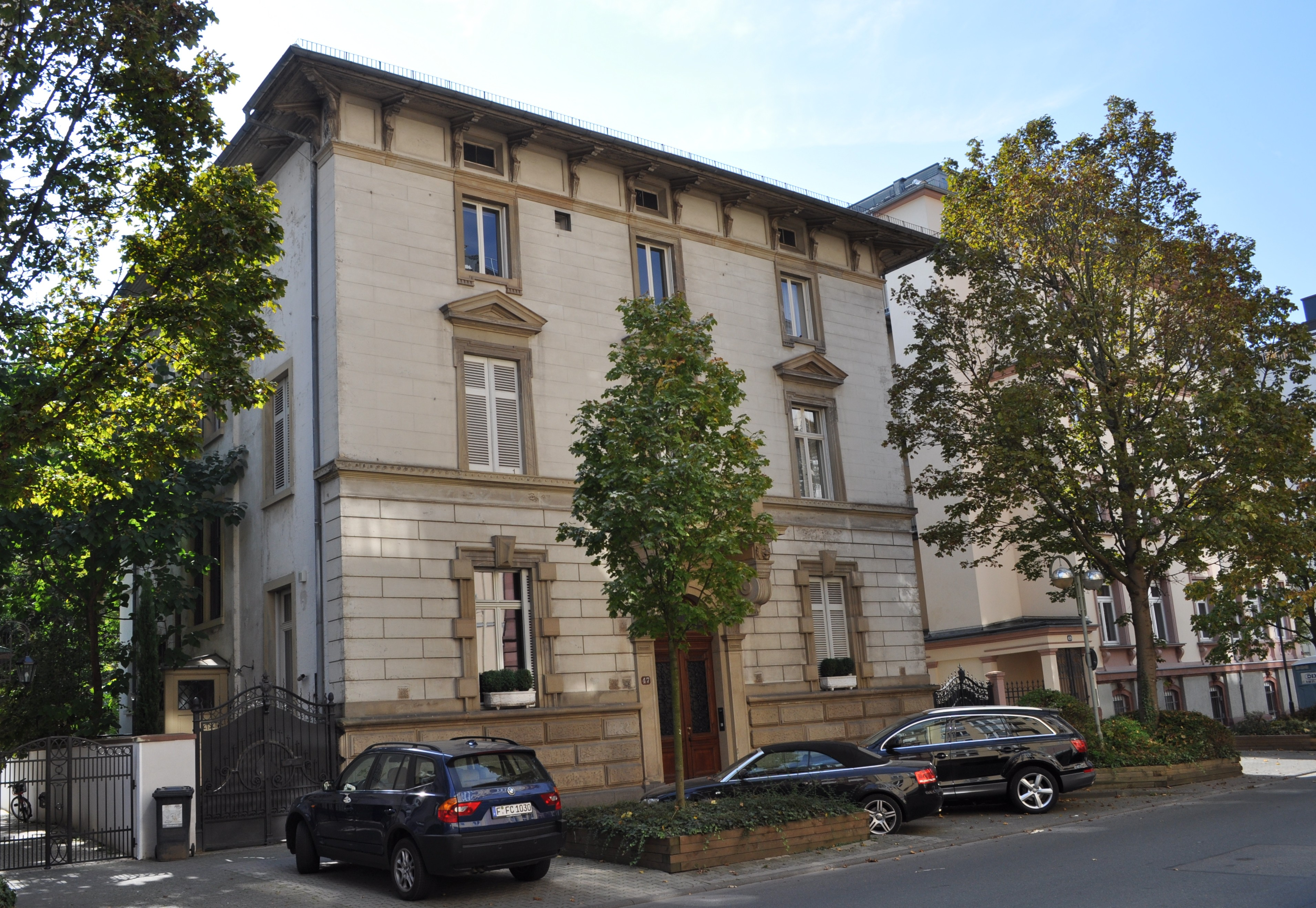
Building bought by the Frankfurt Physical Society in 1926 for the Institute of Meteorology

In the mid-1920s, finances improved after the society outsourced most of its staff and building expenses. In 1926, the Society bought Feldbergstraße 47, a villa in Westend, for Franz Linke's Institute of Meteorology. Franz Linke himself took out a loan, hoping to refinance it by selling weather reports. The focus of the organisation now shifted from research and academic education to public education. This part of the Society's missioon had never ceased, with the first public observation nights in the society's observatory having been held in October 1907. Starting in 1907, Volksvorlesungen (public lectures) were held on Fridays, often featuring live experiments. Lectures for groups such as trade unions were also offered.

The only institute the Society itself continued to operate was the Planeten-Institut. When Martin Brendel had to retire as a university professor due to age in 1928, the institute continued to operate with Brendel as its head. The International Committee on Intellectual Cooperation initiated a report for the League of Nations regarding the importance of the institute. Preliminary calculations were prepared by observatories around the world, including those in Shanghai, Leningrad, and Warsaw, and were then finalized and compiled in Frankfurt. On 1 April 1931, the institute was integrated into the university, ending the Society's era of independent research.

Another expansion began in 1930 when the society acquired a hereditary lease for the property at Robert-Mayer-Straße 6, adjacent to its main building, to construct a specialized facility for the Institute for Physical Chemistry. The project was financed through a combination of welfare funds, private membership donations, and a construction grant from the university. The building was ceremonially handed over to director Karl-Friedrich Bonhoeffer on 11 May 1931, featuring a keynote lecture on "Autoxidation" by Nobel laureate Fritz Haber. In 1928, a new dome for the observatory was constructed, as the original had proven unsuitable for its intended use. The refractor telescope was also overhauled in 1929.

=== The society under National Socialism ===
Following Adolf Hitler's rise to power in 1933, the society faced Gleichschaltung. In 1933, the electrotechnical school was integrated into the Haus der Technik, a merger of several technical associations, and was subsequently placed under the jurisdiction of the Ministry for Armaments. The society itself, however, retained its autonomy and its right to be consulted on academic appointments. When the Ministry in Berlin considered abolishing the chair for physical chemistry in 1934, the society successfully intervened by emphasizing its status as "co-founder" of the university and mobilizing support from Frankfurt's industrial firms to preserve the professorship.

The society's institutional influence was challenged in 1935 during the process to appoint Bonhoeffer's successor. While the Ministry favored Peter Adolf Thiessen, the society advocated for Günter Scheibe, arguing that Thiessen's specialisation was unsuitable for the institute. This intervention resulted in a sharp rejection from ministerial official Franz Bachér, who dismissed the society's arguments. The Ministry ultimately bypassed the society's preferences and appointed Hans-Joachim Schumacher, a member of the NSDAP and Sturmabteilung. Following this dispute, the society lost its right to be consulted on university appointments.

Following the period of hyperinflation, membership fell continuously, reaching a low of 263 by 1937. By this time, many Jewish members had already emigrated from Germany or cancelled their memberships due to financial hardship. Following the November pogroms of 9–10 November 1938, the society began actively removing members classified as Jewish under the Nuremberg Laws. A questionnaire was sent to members requiring them to clarify whether they were of Aryan descent. Several board members were also forced to resign during this period, including Richard Merton, Bernhard Salomon, and Alfred Petersen. To avoid potential conflict, a plaque at the building's entrance honoring Jewish donors was covered with wallpaper. Although Nazi leadership later decreed that plaques containing the names of Jewish donors did not necessarily have to be removed or hidden, the society kept the plaque covered for the remainder of the war.

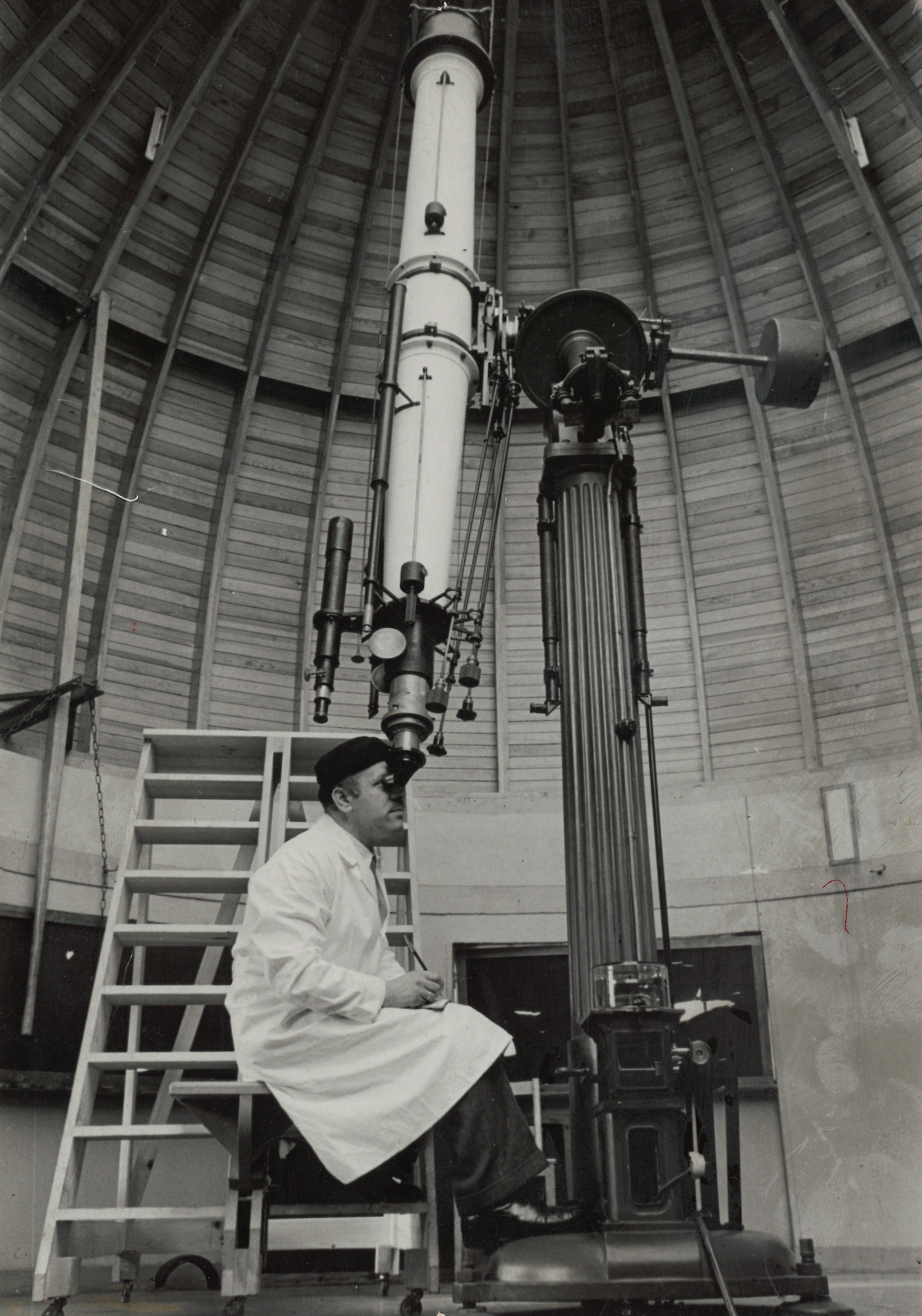
As head of the astronomy department, Karl Boda invited groups and school to public observation nights in the observatory

During the 1930s, the society prioritized Schülervorlesungen (student lectures) and Volksvorlesungen (public lectures). The observatory was opened to the general public for observation sessions, which included hosting viewings and lectures for the Strength Through Joy programme.

During World War II, some research conducted at the institutes was deemed essential to the war effort. The Institute for Applied Physics requisitioned the rooms of the electrotechnical school for military-related research, forcing the school to relocate. Due to severe labor shortages, the society petitioned the armaments command for labor; consequently, a Ukrainian forced laborer named Maria Olenitsch was assigned to the society in 1943 to serve as an assistant stoker for the building's central heating system.

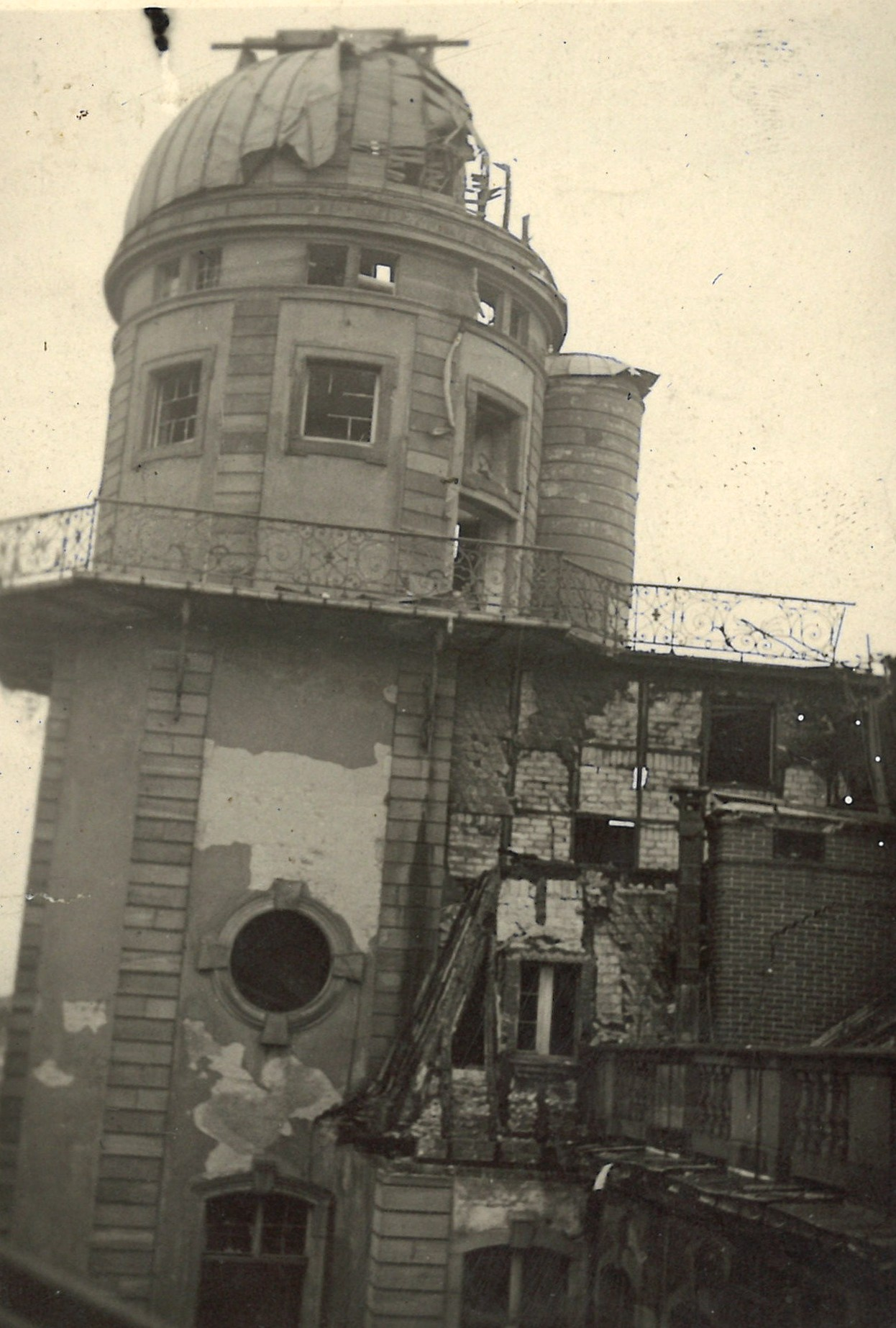
The observatory after bombings in 1944

By the final year of the war, Allied air raids nearly destroyed the society's headquarters. On the night of 12 September 1944, an aerial mine detonated in front of the main entrance, damaging every room, while the 1931 Physical Chemistry building was completely leveled by an explosive bomb. A final bombing on 5 March 1945 destroyed the primary structural beam of the large lecture hall, rendering the auditorium unusable.

=== Transformation into a public observatory ===
Activities had virtually ceased during the final months of the war. The first postwar general assembly was held in June 1946, and lectures resumed that summer. In July 1946, the Ministry of Culture and the Office of Military Government, United States officially authorized the society to resume its operations.

Reconstruction of the headquarters at Robert-Mayer-Straße 2–4 began in 1949, facilitated by 1.2 million DM in mortgages secured through the Hauck & Aufhäuser bank, which had provided the society's treasurer for decades. The topping-out ceremony was held on 28 September 1951. During this phase, a fourth floor was added to the original structure to alleviate chronic space shortages. While the small lecture hall had remained usable throughout the reconstruction, the large lecture hall was not reopened until 28 May 1956. To manage the society's debt, the city of Frankfurt and the state of Hesse agreed to cover the interest and amortisation of the reconstruction mortgages—an arrangement viewed as compensation for the university's continued occupancy of the society's property.

By 1960, the society's focus shifted further toward public education, as the board recognized that a private institution could no longer sustain the requirements of a modern "mass university". On 30 May 1960, the observatory reopened with an overhauled refractor and a new elevator to facilitate public access. In 1962, society members formed an astronomy working group to organize public observation nights and lectures. The observatory welcomed over 2,000 visitors in 1963 and more than 3,000 in 1967.

During the 1960s, plans emerged for what would later become the AfE-Turm, a 116 metres (381 ft) tower located opposite the observatory. The society's board concluded in 1967 that if the tower were constructed, the observatory would have to be relocated. Potential sites such as Niddapark and Frankfurt-Riedberg were discussed, with the intention of incorporating a planetarium into the new complex. However, the project never came to fruition because the proposed locations were deemed poorly connected to the city and funding for the planetarium could not be secured.

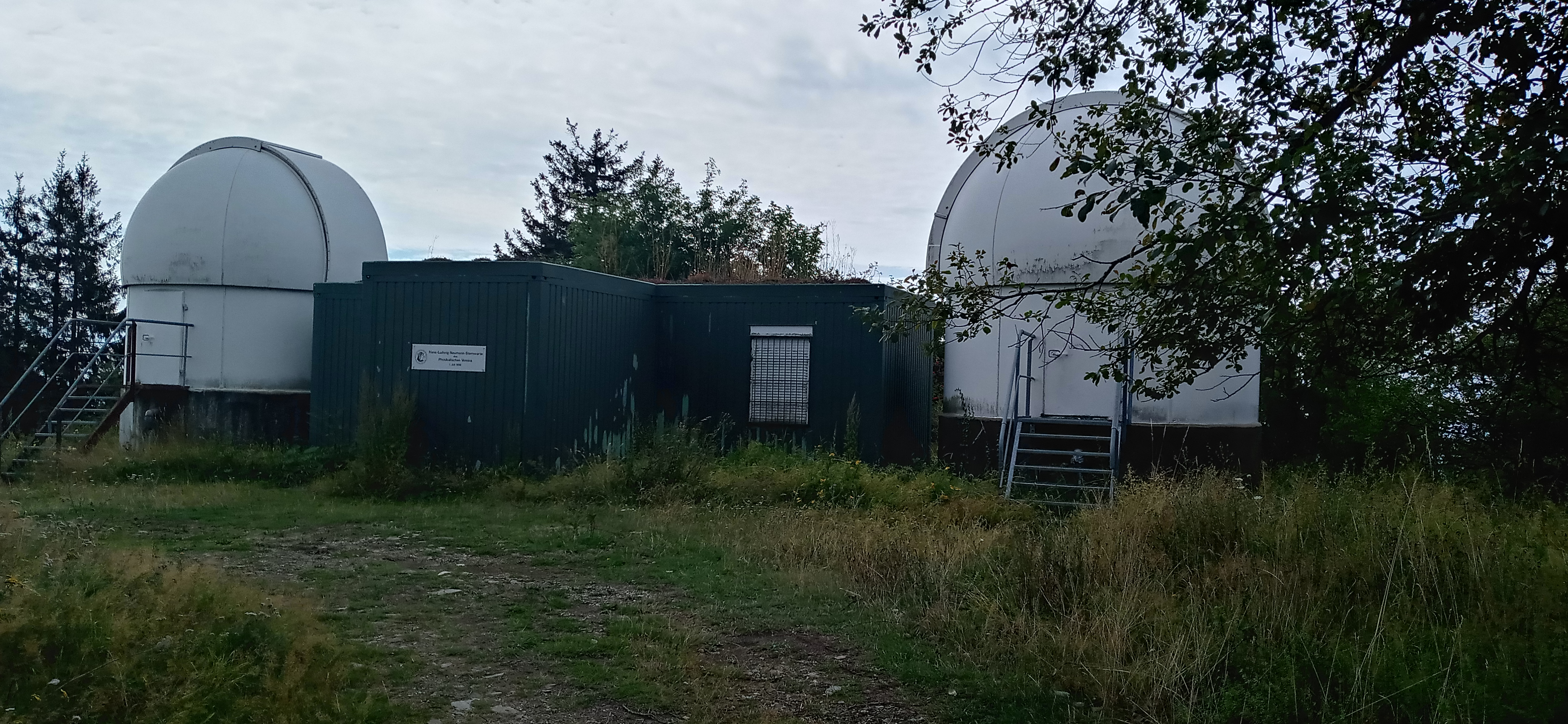
Hans-Ludwig-Neumann-Sternwarte

Plans for a new observatory were discussed again in 1974 with the establishment of a dedicated working group. Their efforts eventually led to the creation of the Hans-Ludwig-Neumann-Sternwarte (observatory code B01), which opened in July 1998 at the Taunus Observatory site. The facility features two domes, each with a diameter of 4.2 metres (14 ft). One dome houses a 60 centimetres (24 in) Ritchey–Chrétien telescope, while the other contains a 31.7 centimetres (12.5 in) astrograph. The observatory is used for amateur astronomy, astrophotography, and research by its members. In November 2006, Erwin Schwab and Rainer Kling discovered their first minor planet there; since then, 139 minor planets have been discovered at the observatory.

In the early 2000s, it became clear that the university would relocate its science institutes to the new Riedberg campus. This prompted renewed discussions to repurpose the society's main building as a museum or planetarium once the university vacated the space. However, funding could not be secured. Instead, the Senckenberg Nature Research Society took over the building in 2010, though the society retained its usage rights for the observatory and office spaces. Concurrently, the Institute for Meteorology vacated its building on Feldbergstraße, which was subsequently sold.

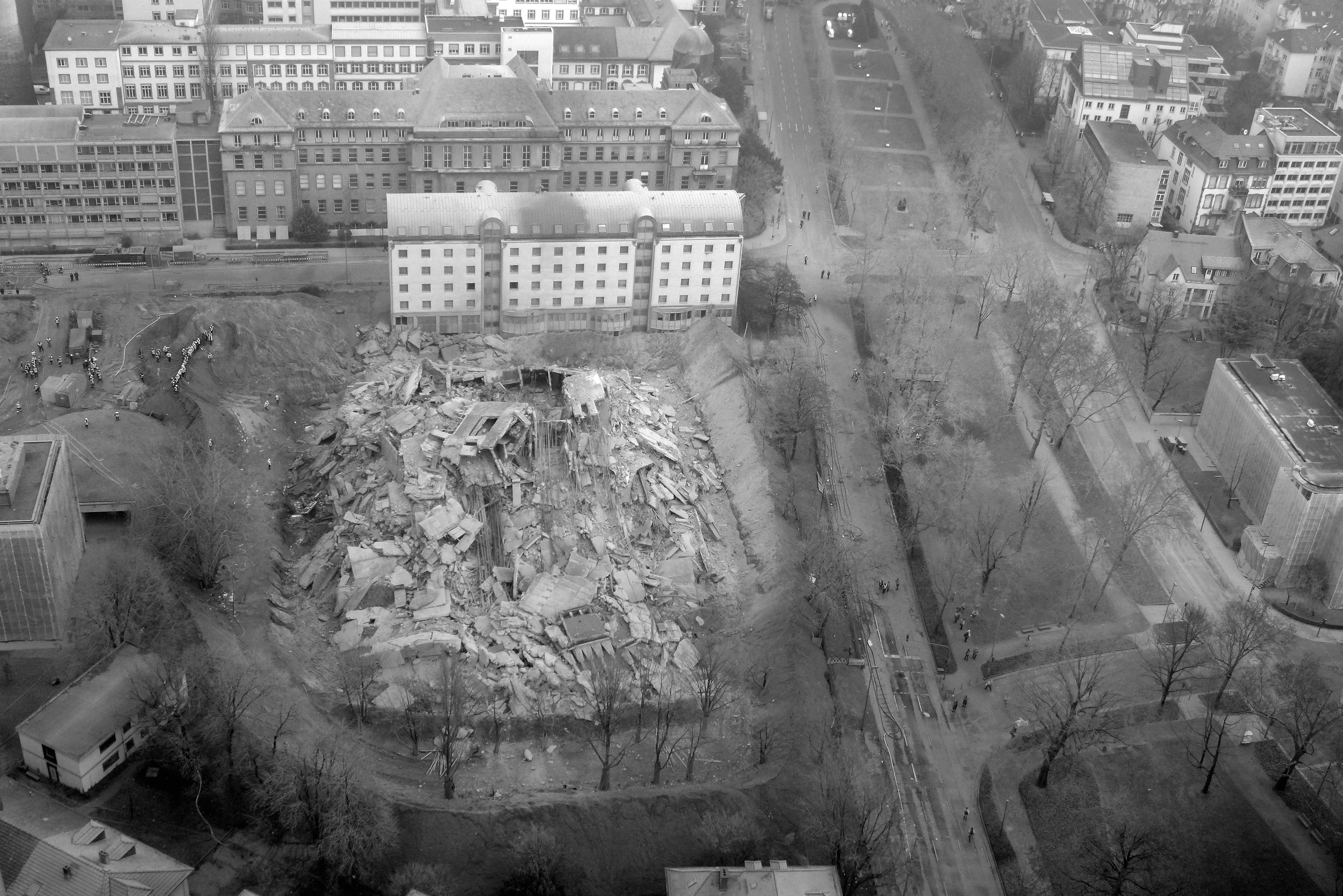
When AfE-Tower was demolished in 2014, Frankfurt observatory had to be protected by a cover. After the demolition, renovations started.

Between December 2013 and June 2017, the Senckenberg Nature Research Society oversaw extensive renovations of the building, directed by architect Peter Kulka. The project was part of a broader, simultaneous modernisation of the Senckenberg Society's buildings including the Jügelhaus. To address the historically poor functional integration between the structures, Kulka's design connected the buildings via newly constructed transparent bridges. While efforts were made to preserve the historical impression of the complex, the society's lecture hall was entirely rebuilt into a modern facility, and the roofs were updated with energy-efficient aluminum sheeting – a design choice that drew some criticism.

Work on the rooftop observatory was handled separately and took longer to complete. Its rotating dome and opening mechanisms required a mechanical overhaul before the dismounted telescopes could be reinstalled. In addition to modernizing the windows, the rooftop platform was expanded to provide space for additional mobile telescopes. Following the society's return to the premises in June 2017, the building was officially renamed the Arthur-von-Weinberg-Building, honoring the shared benefactor of both the Physikalischer Verein and the Senckenberg Society.

=== Recent years ===
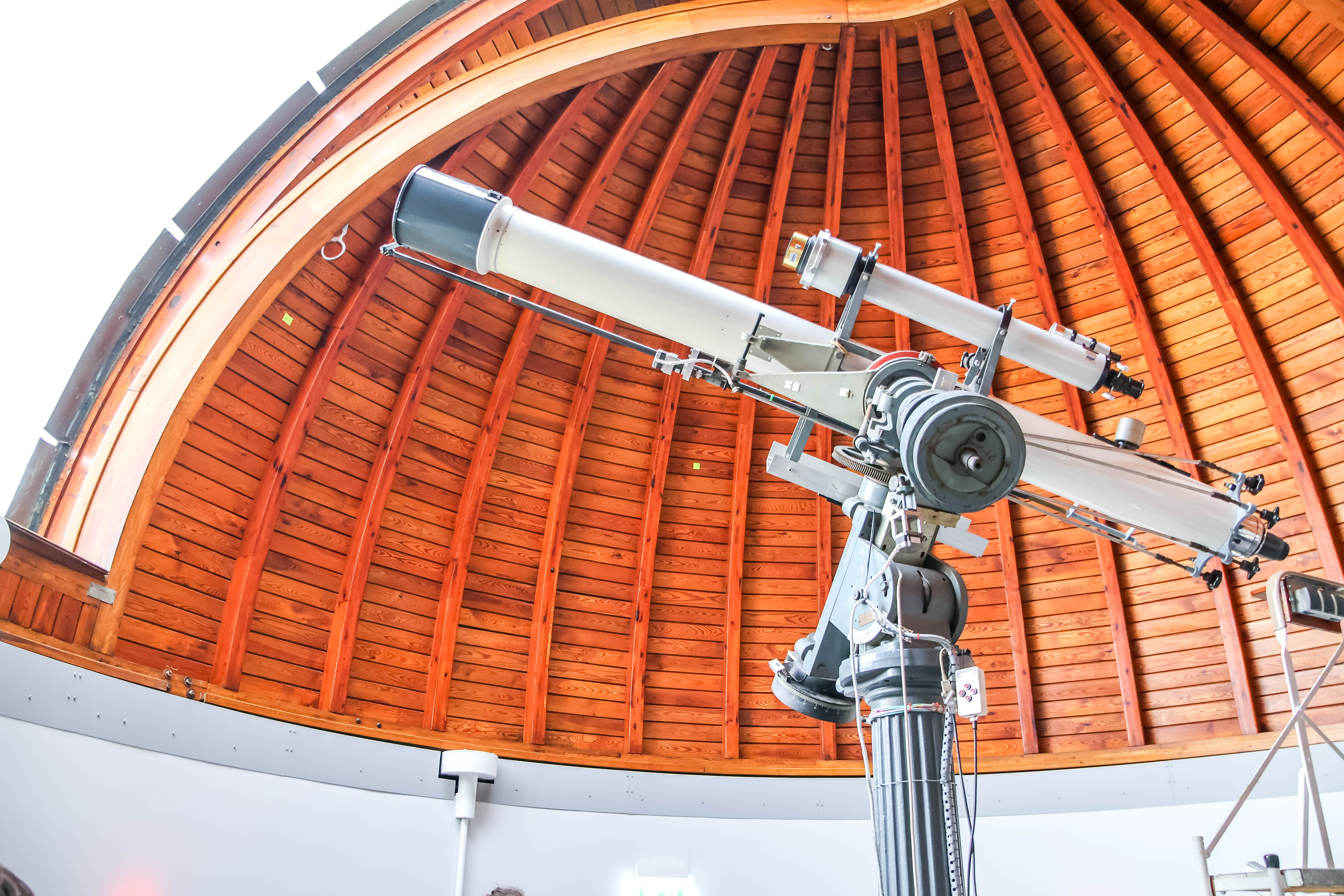
Public observations are regularly offered in Frankfurt observatory

The public outreach and educational initiatives of the Physikalischer Verein serve as its primary means of science communication, bridging the gap between academic research and the general public. In 2024, the society celebrated its 200th anniversary with over 350 events, including a central festive act in the Kaisersaal of the Römer and the publication of a 200-page commemorative volume. During the jubilee year, the society recorded nearly 30,000 visitors across its public programs, which include workshops, observation nights, and a weekly lecture series on astronomy.

The society's digital presence has expanded significantly, with its YouTube channel recording nearly 15,000 subscribers. In addition to its local facilities, the society's youth group, the AstroClub, oversees the operation of "RESPECT-S", a remote-controlled spectroscopic telescope located in Trevinca, Spain. Looking forward, the society is collaborating with the Senckenberg Nature Research Society to plan and construct a planetarium in Frankfurt.

The society awards four distinct prizes to promote scientific achievements across various disciplines:

- Science Prize (Wissenschaftspreis): Established in 1996 and originally named after Philipp Siedler, this prize is awarded for outstanding graduation theses in the physics departments of Goethe University. Nominees must be proposed by their supervising university professors, and up to three prizes are awarded annually.
- Physics Didactics Prize (Physikdidaktik-Preis): Awarded since 1998 and originally named after Eugen Hartmann, this prize honors exceptional state examination (Staatsexamen) theses from the Institute for Didactics of Physics at Goethe University.
- Environmental Prize (Umweltpreis): First awarded in 1996 and originally named after Christian Ernst Neeff, this prize recognizes interdisciplinary work focused on environmental protection and technology. Up to three prizes can be awarded annually to amateur researchers and school students.
- Astronomy Prize (Astronomie-Preis): This prize is awarded annually to a maximum of three amateur astronomers, primarily from the Rhine-Main region. Established in 1996, it originally honored Samuel Thomas von Soemmerring.

== Corporate identity ==
The society's full name in German is Physikalischer Verein – Gesellschaft für Bildung und Wissenschaft, with the traditional short name Physical Society expanded to emphasize the organisation's focus on education and science. While the German name does not include a geographic reference, English-language publications typically add one, referring to it, for example, as the Physical Society Frankfort or Physical Society of Frankfurt-on-Main.

The society's logo features the Egyptian goddess Isis, referencing the veil of Isis—a symbol of the hidden mysteries of nature. While the exact date of Isis's adoption as the society's emblem is unknown, the figure appeared on letterhead in the late 19th century. One of the earliest known publications to feature the logo is the commemorative volume for the society's centennial in 1924.

The Physikalischer Verein is an altrechtlicher Verein. It was recognized as a legal person by a royal cabinet order of the Kingdom of Prussia in June 1876. Because it was founded before the Bürgerliches Gesetzbuch was codified in 1900, it is not registered as a standard eingetragener Verein. It does, however, maintain the status of a charitable organisation.

The society was managed by a board of directors until 2008, when the structure was reorganised into a presidium and the chairman's title was changed to president. The presidium consists of four to seven members elected by a governing board (Verwaltungsrat). The 12 to 20 members of the governing board are, in turn, elected by the general assembly. The current president is physicist and patent attorney Dorothée Weber-Bruls. The governing board may also elect an honorary president; in 2025, chemist and former president Wolfgang Grünbein was appointed to this role.

== Notable people ==
=== Members ===
In its first publication dating from 1826 the Physical Society lists 160 people as its members. In the first years of activity, lectures were open primarily to – male – members who were allowed to bring their wives, sons and daughters. Starting only after Albert had left in 1834, the society tried to attract guest listeners to its lectures. Among the first members of the Society Jews can be found as members such as Nathan Mayer Rothschild, members of the Speyer family or the Oppenheim family. Until 1933, no distinction was made based on religion. Starting in 1898, women could join the society as members.

Membership numbers grew steadily until 1911, reaching a peak of 1,084 shortly after the inauguration of the society's new headquarters. While figures declined during the First World War, they saw a brief resurgence in 1918. However, the hyperinflation starting in 1919 and the subsequent global economic crisis led to a sharp drop in membership, which hit a historic low of 249 in 1941. By 1945, the society had approximately 300 members. Substantial growth did not resume until after 1975. Today, the Physical Society has 2,365 members.

=== Honorary members ===
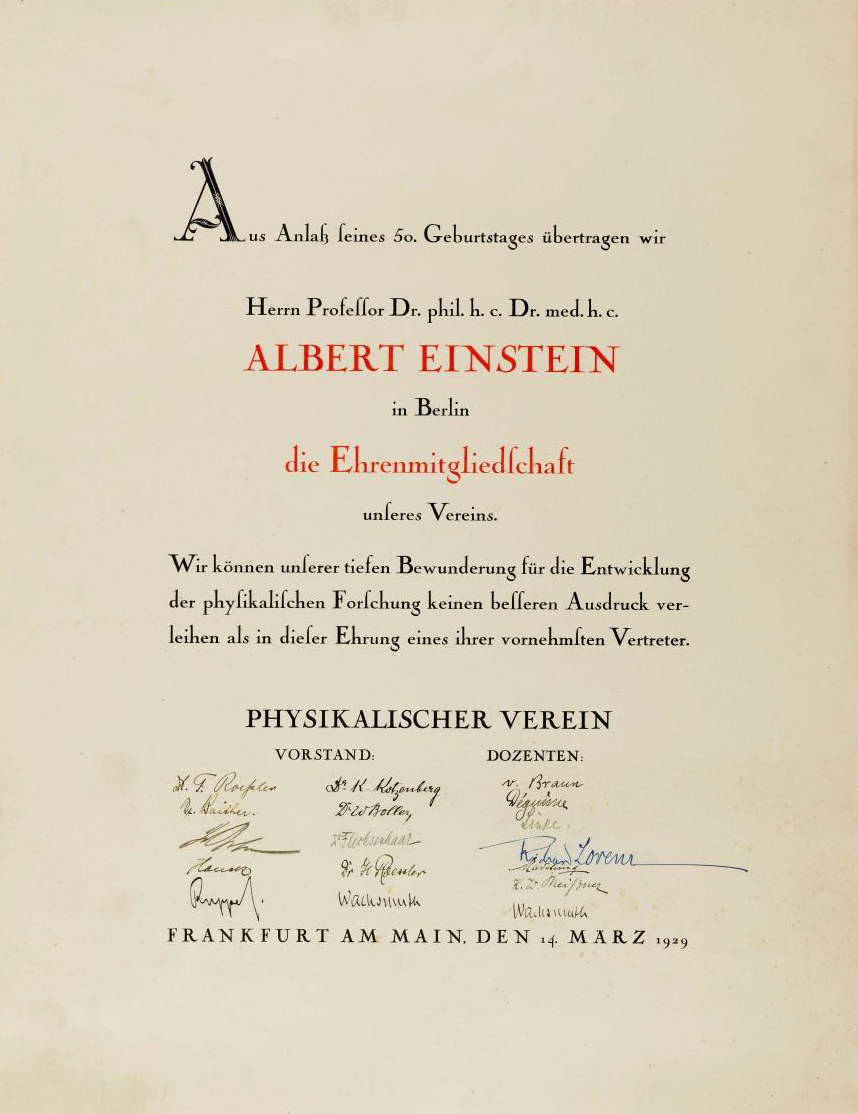
Certificate sent to Albert Einstein in 1929 after he had accepted the honorary membership

Following a 1835 amendment to its statutes, the society began appointing honorary members to increase its scientific reputation and broaden its influence. Candidates were chosen for their significant contributions to science or for providing generous donations. The first honorary members, appointed in late 1834, were the explorer Eduard Rüppell and the physician Matthias de Neufville. Initially, the society maintained a separate category for corresponding members, but this distinction was abolished in 1847, with all such members thereafter classified as honorary.

While the society admitted women as audience members from its early years, it did not appoint its first female honorary member until 2014, when physicist Johanna Stachel was recognized. Other women later appointed include Nobel laureate Christiane Nüsslein-Volhard (2015), laser pioneer Gisela Eckhardt (2018), and physicist Cornelia Denz (2024). As of 2025, the society has named a total of 417 honorary members. Notable individuals on the list include:

- Michael Faraday (1839)
- Carl Friedrich Gauß (1839)
- Alexander von Humboldt (1839)
- Georg Simon Ohm (1851)
- Charles Wheatstone (1854)
- Edmond Becquerel (1868)
- Silvanus P. Thompson (1882)
- Lord Kelvin (1886)
- John Tyndall (1886)
- Svante Arrhenius (1894)
- Ferdinand von Zeppelin (1906)
- Karl Schwarzschild (1911)
- Max Born (1924)
- Otto Hahn (1924)
- Albert Einstein (1928)
- Otto Stern (1930)
- Walther Gerlach (1949)
- Joachim Trümper (1995)
- Hans Bethe (2004)
- Johanna Stachel (2014)
- Christiane Nüsslein-Volhard (2015)
- Benjamin List (2024)

=== Faculty ===
Between 1833 and 1914, the society employed its own staff of lecturers who were responsible for delivering educational series to its members. Towards the end of the 19th century, these roles evolved into a more formal academic structure encompassing both research and instruction, with many lecturers receiving the title of professor in recognition of their work. Upon the founding of the university in 1914, these individuals transitioned into university professorships, though several, including Nobel laureate Max von Laue, maintained part-time lecturing positions at the society into the 1920s.

The academic focus of these positions expanded significantly over time. While a single lecturer covered both chemistry and physics from 1833 to 1860, the disciplines were eventually separated into independent roles. Specialized lectureships were later established for electrical engineering (1891), meteorology (1906), astronomy (1907), and physical chemistry and metallurgy (1908).

- Karl Wiebel, 1833–1835
- Rudolf Christian Böttger, 1835–1881, from 1860–1881 chemistry
- Friedrich Eisenlohr, 1860–1861, physics
- Ernst Abbe, 1861–1862, physics
- Johann Joseph Oppel, 1862–1864, physics
- Friedrich Kohlrausch, 1864–1866, physics
- Wilhelm August Nippoldt, 1868–1878, physics
- Georg Krebs, 1879–1891, physics
- Paul Harzer, 1881, chemistry
- Bernhard Lepsius, 1881–1891, chemistry
- Rudolf de Neufville, 1891–1895, chemistry
- Paul August Bode, 1891, physics
- Joseph Epstein, 1891–1897, electrical engineering
- Walter König, 1892–1900, physics
- Martin Freund, 1895–1914, chemistry
- Carl Déguisne, 1897–1914, electrical engineering
- Hermann Theodor Simon, 1900–1901, physics
- Ulrich Behn, 1901–1906, physics
- Kurt Wegener, 1906–1908, meteorology
- Martin Brendel, 1907–1914, astronomy
- Richard Wachsmuth, 1907–1914, physics
- Richard Lorenz, 1908–1914, physical chemistry and metallurgy
- Franz Linke, 1908–1914, meteorology

== Impact and reception ==
Panagiotis Kitmeridis argues that the Physikalischer Verein was an asset to Frankfurt's civil society and especially to the Bildungsbürgertum in multiple ways. The society's members were able to transfer scientific findings acquired at the organisation into practical applications, thereby generating new economic growth. Furthermore, the society served as a substitute for a non-existing university in Frankfurt and prepared school pupils for university studies elsewhere. Unlike other organisations the society could quickly adapt to new scientific discoveries and focused research and education in new fields like electrical engineering or x-ray-technology, bringing these to the public.

Jason Lemberg argues that the society helped establish a chemical industry in Frankfurt by providing education to young chemists like Leo Gans. The relationship between the society and industry shifted over time; by volunteering for leadership positions within the board, representatives of the chemical industry were able to participate in appointment procedures even after the founding of Goethe University Frankfurt until 1933. They influenced research focuses by recommending specific appointments and donating specialized equipment.

During the Second Industrial Revolution starting in the 1870s Frankfurt industry had a growing interest in talented workers and therefore supported the society financially and with people like Leo Gans volunteering at the society in leading positions. The society's educational programs were instrumental in shaping the careers of prominent scientists, for example the Nobel laureate and Frankfurt native Otto Hahn. Although Hahn initially found school chemistry "boring to the point of sleep," his interest was piqued during his final school years after attending an evening course on organic dyes held at the society by Martin Freund. This experience provided the foundation for his decision to study chemistry.
