= Schmitten im Taunus =

- Municipality
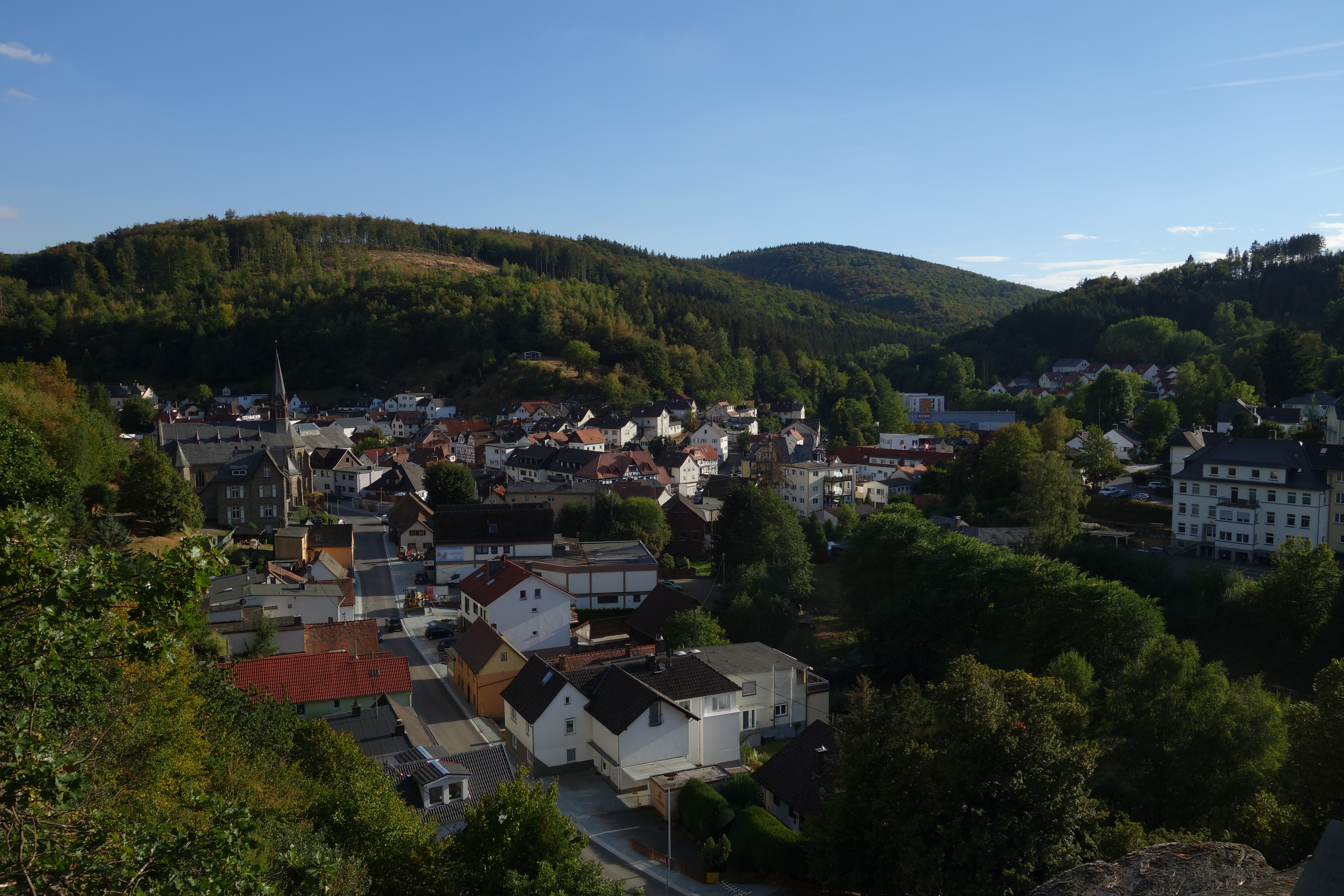
- View over Schmitten with mountains Pfaffenrod (596,2 m; left) and Sängelberg (665 m; in the middle); town hall on the right

- Flag Coat of arms

- Location of Schmitten im Taunus within Hochtaunuskreis district
- Interactive map of Schmitten im Taunus
- Location within Germany Location within Hesse
- Coordinates: 50°16′N 8°27′E
- Country: Germany
- State: Hesse
- Admin. region: Darmstadt
- District: Hochtaunuskreis

Government
  - Mayor (2020–26): Julia Krügers (CDU)

Area
  - Total: 35.51 km^{2} (13.71 sq mi)
- Elevation: 357–879 m (1,171–2,884 ft)

Population (2025-12-31)
  - Total: 9,361
  - Density: 263.6/km^{2} (682.8/sq mi)
- Time zone: UTC+01:00 (CET)
  - Summer (DST): UTC+02:00 (CEST)
- Postal codes: 61389
- Dialling codes: 06082, 06084
- Vehicle registration: HG, USI
- Website: www.schmitten.de

Schmitten im Taunus (German pronunciation: [ˈʃmɪtn̩ ʔɪm ˈtaʊnʊs], lit. 'Schmitten in the Taunus'; until 25 August 2021 Schmitten) is a municipality in the Hochtaunuskreis in Hessen, Germany.

== Geography ==
Schmitten is the highest municipality in the Taunus, approximately 24 km north of Frankfurt am Main, within which is the Großer Feldberg (881m). Schmitten has extensive forest areas. The municipal forest alone covers almost 13 km². There are two nature reserve areas (Naturschutzgebiet): Saubach und Niedgesbach bei Schmitten and Reifenberger Wiesen.

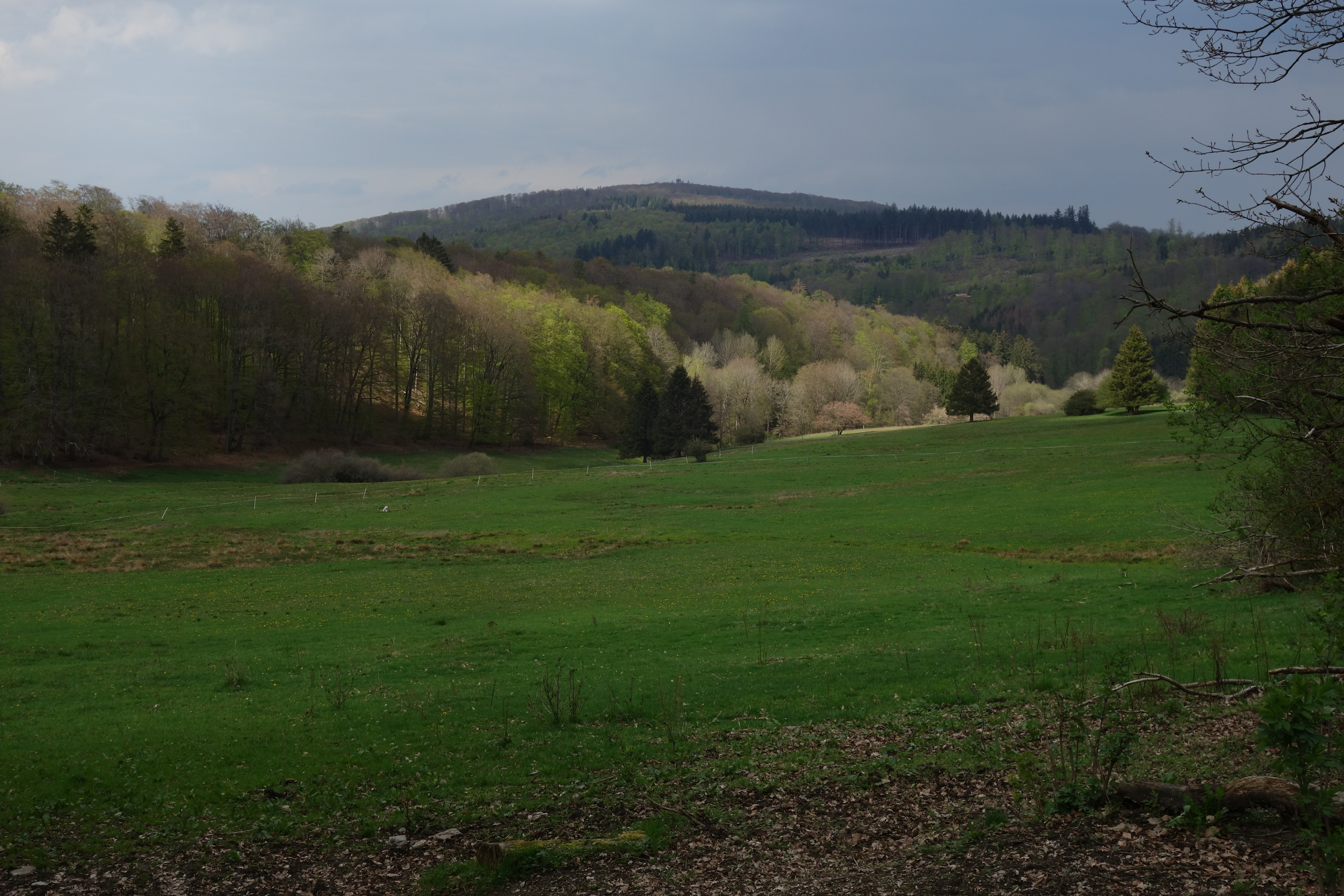
Nature reserve Saubach und Niedgesbach bei Schmitten; Pferdskopf mountain in the back

=== Neighbouring municipalities ===
Schmitten borders in the north on the municipality of Weilrod and the town of Usingen, in the east on the towns of Neu-Anspach and Bad Homburg, in the south on the towns of Oberursel and Königstein, and in the west on the municipalities of Glashütten and Waldems (Rheingau-Taunus-Kreis).

=== Constituent municipalities ===
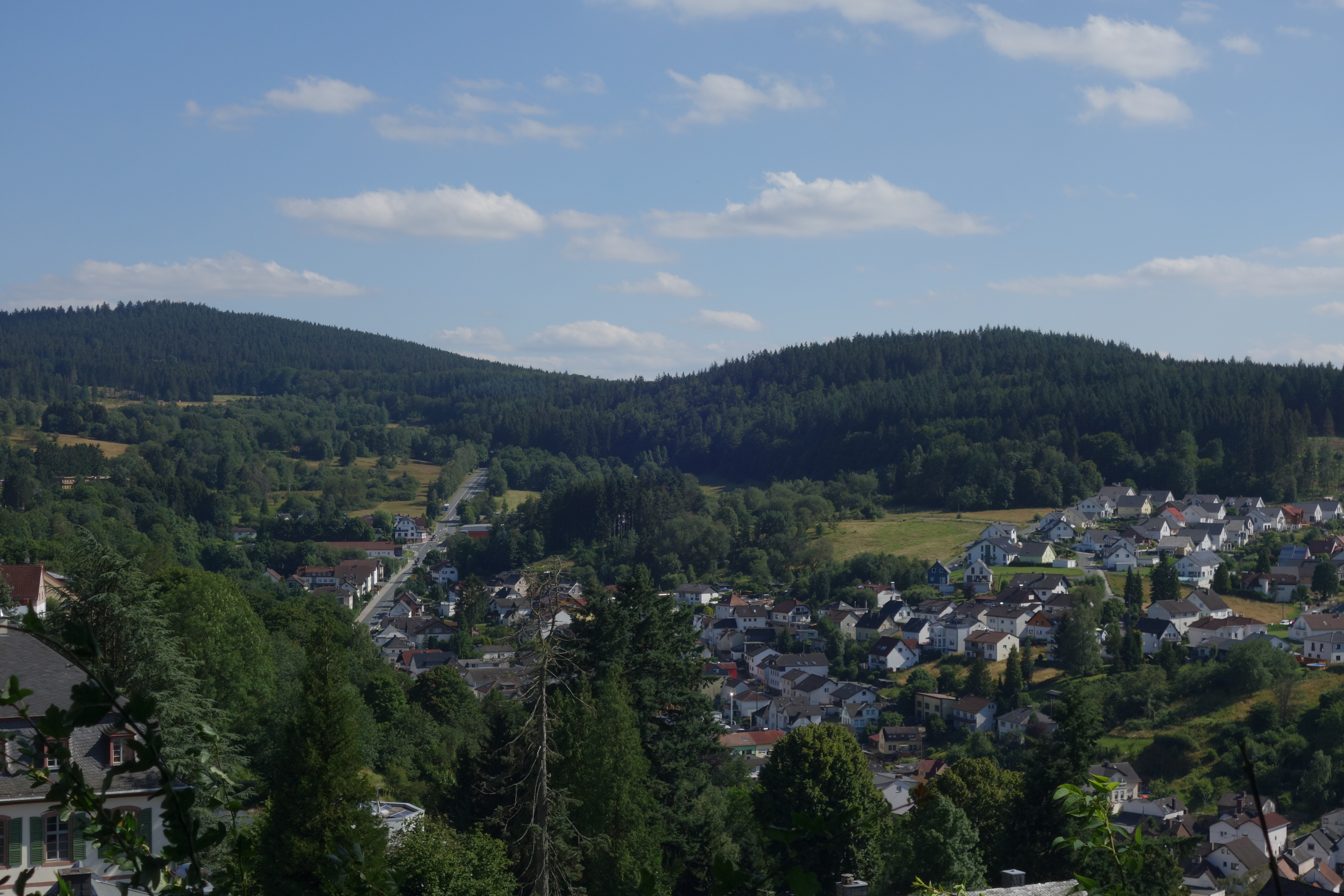
View from Reifenberg castle over Niederreifenberg with mountains Kleiner Feldberg (left) and Weilsberg (right)

The greater municipality has nine centres (until municipal reform in 1972, all independent municipalities) named Arnoldshain, Brombach, Dorfweil, Hunoldstal, Niederreifenberg, Oberreifenberg, Schmitten, Seelenberg and Treisberg.

== History ==
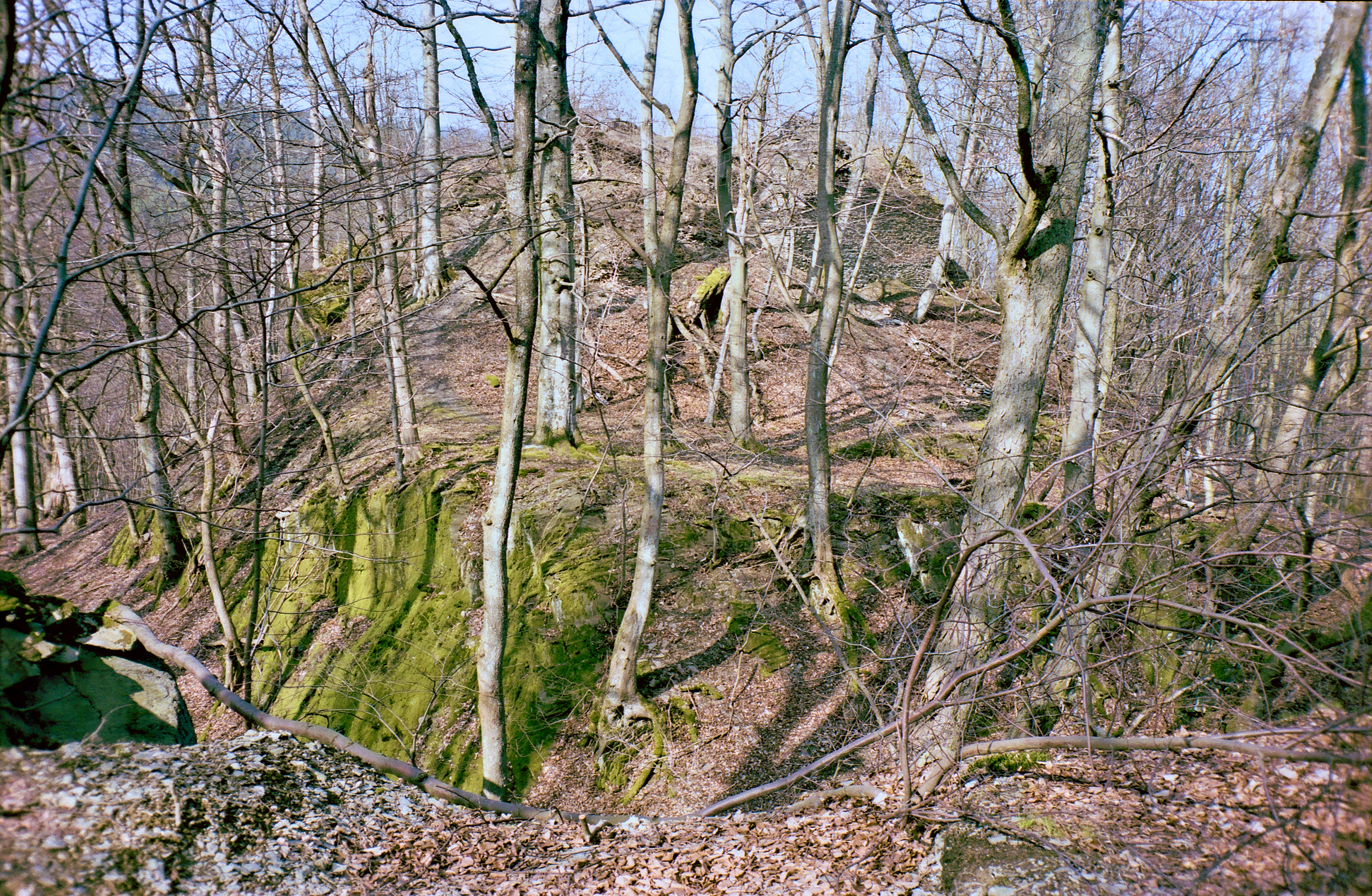
Hattstein Castle's ruins in 2004 with ditch in the foreground and a piece of wall on the knoll through the trees

Schmitten had its first documented mention in 1399 as Waldschmidt. The name comes from a nail-making smith in the woods nearby (Wald is German for "forest"; Schmidt has the same root as Schmiede – smith) which were attached to Hattstein Castle (mentioned in 1215). The Hattstein Knights ("Hazechenstein") were akin to the Reifenbergers ("Riffinberg"), possibly even the same. These families' origins were either in the Westerwald area north of the Lahn or the Limburg area. In the Walsdorfer Gründungsurkunde ("Walsdorf Founding Document") of 1156, a "Guntramus de Hazechenstein" is named.

The Hattstein Knights, whose castle was destroyed several times, had property in Bad Camberg, Usingen ("Hattsteiner Weiher"), Stockheim, Weilbach, Aschaffenburg, Mainaschaff, Königstein and Frankfurt am Main. The Hattsteiners also participated in the founding of Münzenberg Castle in the Wetterau.

The noble family von Hattstein was throughout the Middle Ages one of Hesse's most influential families. Baron Marquard von Hattstein was Bishop of Speyer (1560–1581).

Together with the Knights of Kronberg, the Hattsteiners and Reiffenbergers declared the so-called "Kronberg Feud" in 1389. When on 13 May a great force from Frankfurt swept to Kronberg Castle, Hanau and Electorate of the Palatinate troops rushed to help those being beset, driving the Frankfurt forces off on 14 May in the Battle of Eschborn and taking 620 prisoners, among them the mayor, a few noble council members and all the town's bakers, butchers, locksmiths and shoemakers. Only a ransom payment of 73,000 golden guilders ended the fight with Frankfurt and laid the groundwork for the Frankfurter Landwehr fortifications and Frankfurt's four watchtowers.

The noble family of the Hattstein Knights, which was inseparably bound with Schmitten's history, came to an end with Johann Constantin Philipp von Hattstein's death in 1767.

=== Arnoldshain ===
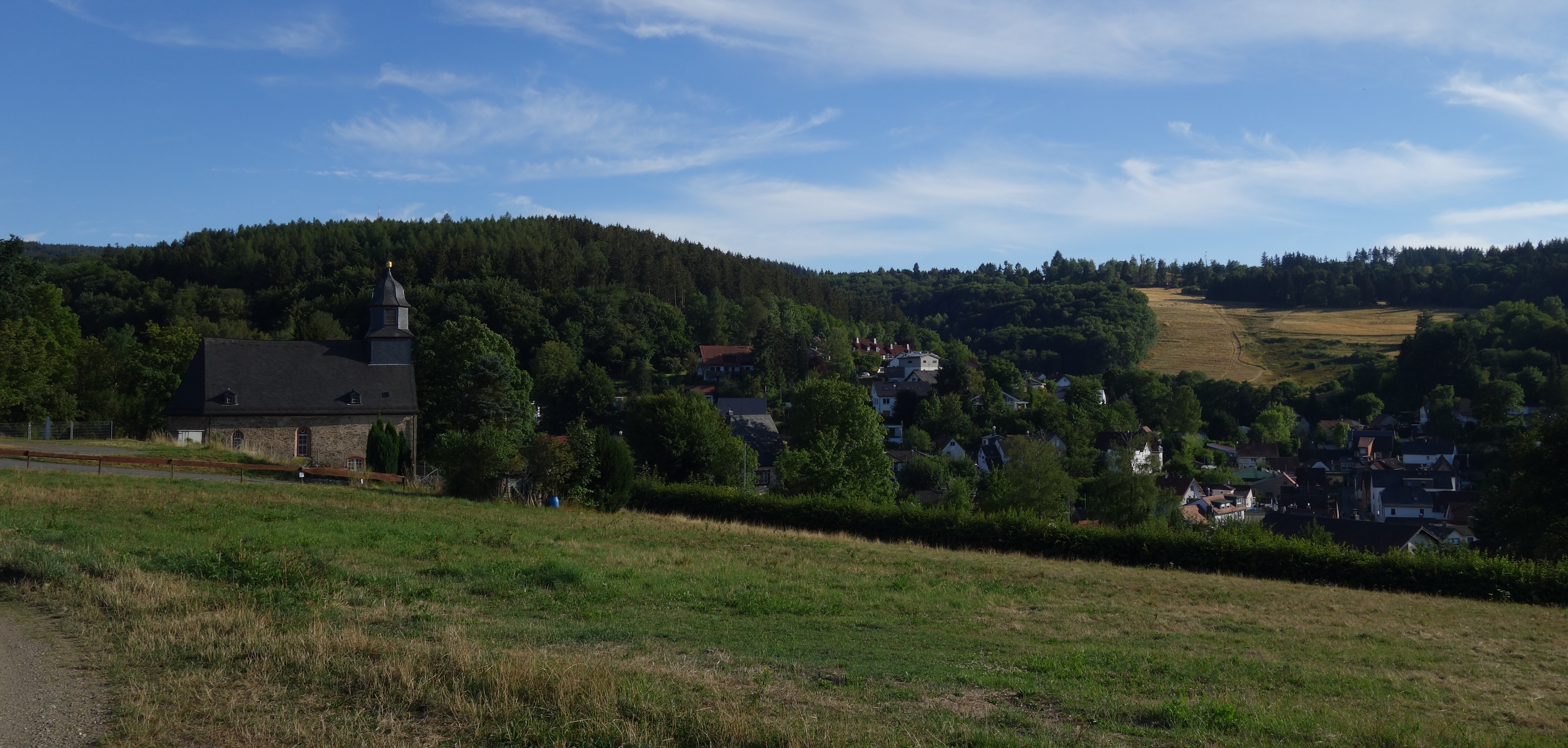
Arnoldshain: Saint Lawrence's Church (Laurentiuskirche) with Junkernberg mountain (636 m) and Arnoldshainer Wiesenhang (Arnoldshain meadow slope, on the right)

Saint Lawrence's Church (Laurentiuskirche) at Arnoldshain was first mentioned early in the 13th century in the Rotulus omnium iurium (Directory of all rights). A few expansions to the once eight-sided chapel notwithstanding, the old part is preserved to this day. The Laurentiuskirche is thereby one of the oldest buildings still in use in the Hochtaunus. In a glass window from 1480 one can still clearly see the Reifenberg family's coat of arms.

Politically Arnoldshain belonged to the Lords of Hattstein, but later partly under Reifenberg (Bassenheim) rule.

=== Dorfweil ===
Dorfweil had its first documentary mention in 772. Lying 410 m above sea level in the Weil Valley, the municipality has many hiking trails. With an area of 367ha and 684 inhabitants (as of the end of 2004), Dorfweil is one of Schmitten's smallest constituent municipalities.

== Sightseeing ==
=== Großer Feldberg ===
The Taunus's highest mountain attracts hundreds of thousands of visitors every year, especially from the Frankfurt Rhein-Main Region.

In Oberreifenberg lifts for skiing and sledding are abundant. The main attraction, however, is the Taunus's nature and many kilometres of hiking trails.

=== Treisberg ===
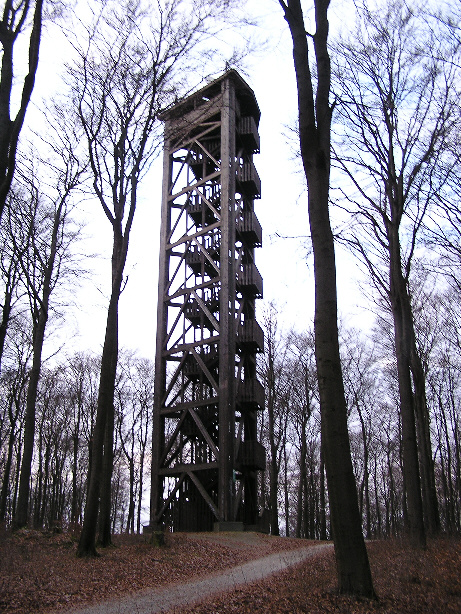
Observation tower on Pferdskopf mountain

The observation tower on the 663 m high Pferdskopf mountain ("Horse's Head") near Treisberg offers a wide view of the Taunus landscape. In winter, skiers and tobogganers are drawn to skilifts.

=== Weiltal ===
Originating on Großer Feldberg mountain, the little brook Weil snakes its way through the Hochtaunus Nature Park to Weilburg. Alongside the Weil runs the Weiltalwanderweg (Weil Valley Hiking Trail). A Weil Valley visit is popular among families and nature lovers, but also for cyclists and motorcyclists.

Besides the yearly Weiltal-Marathon, the traditional "Rund um den Henninger-Turm" bicycle race also runs through the Weil Valley.

=== Limes ===
The Roman Empire's old border runs above Niederreifenberg and Oberreifenberg across the crest of the Taunus. Within Schmitten's municipal limits lies the Limeskastell Kleiner Feldberg, a Roman fort. The preserved foundation walls offer a glimpse into Roman history.

=== Reifenberg Castle ruins ===
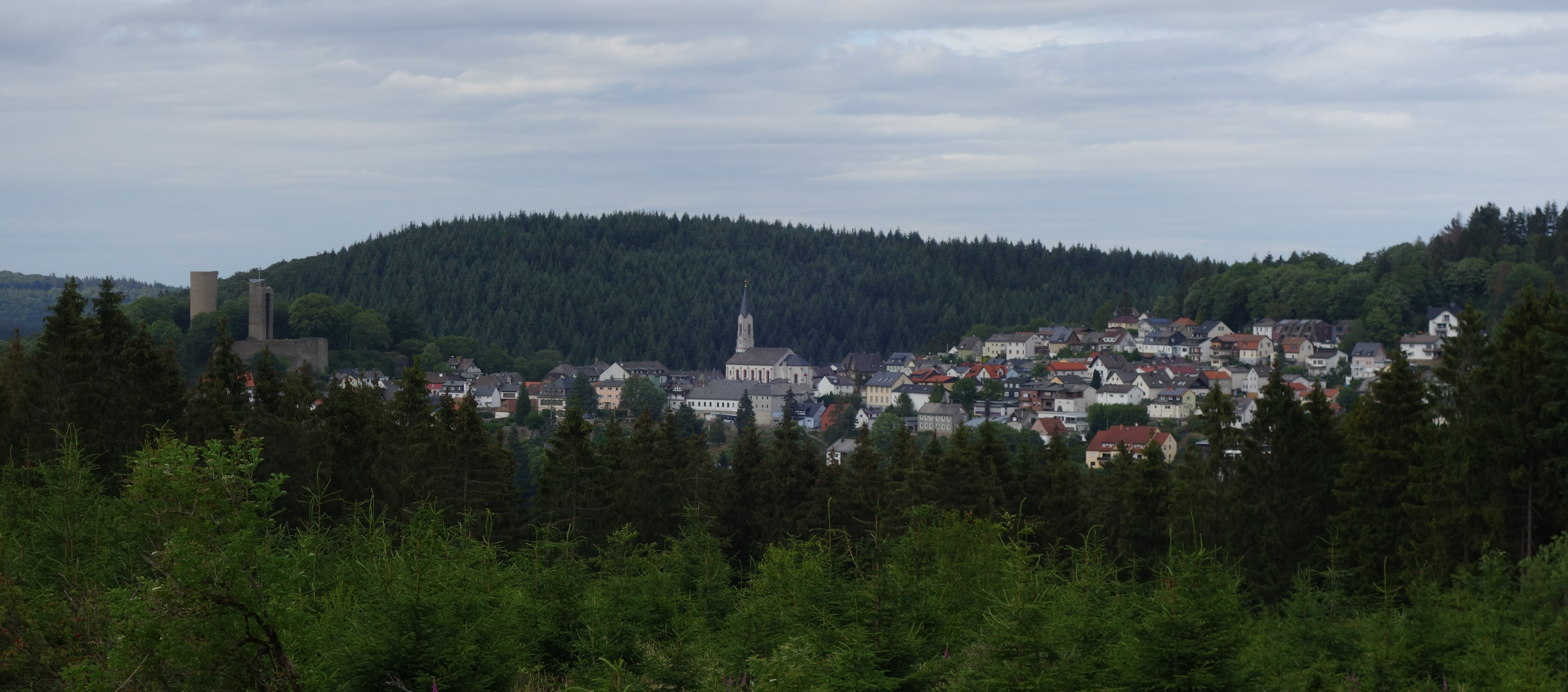
Oberreifenberg and Reifenberg Castle with Sängelberg in the back

The castle's keep and tower are preserved and loom over Oberreifenberg and the Weil Valley.

== Politics ==
=== Municipal council ===
The municipal elections on 14 March 2021 yielded the following results:

- CDU: 10 seats (7 in 2016)
- FWG: 9 seats (7 in 2016)
- b-now: 4 seats (5 in 2016)
- Grüne: 4 seats (3 in 2016)
- SPD: 2 seats (2 in 2016)
- FDP: 1 seat (2 in 2016)
- AfD: 1 seat (0 in 2016)

Note: FWG is a citizens' coalition.

== Partnerships ==
Schmitten maintains partnerships with the following places, all in France:

(France)	Courtomer (1981)
(France)	Moulins-la-Marche (1981)
(France)	Sainte-Gauburge (1981)

== Public institutions ==
=== Educational institutions ===
The municipality of Schmitten has two primary schools.

- Jürgen-Schuhmann-Schule in Arnoldshain
- Grundschule Reifenberg in Niederreifenberg

Furthermore, there exists in Arnoldshain an Evangelical Academy called the "Martin Niemöller" Haus.

=== Sports and leisure ===
- Schmitten (the main town) offers Hesse's highest outdoor swimming pool.
- In Niederreifenberg, quad bikes may be hired.
- In Oberreifenberg the Taunatours company offers rock climbing.

== Personalities ==
=== Notable residents ===
- Oil-drilling pioneer Anton Raky was born in Seelenberg in 1868.
- Theologian Anton Abt was born in Seelenberg in 1841.
- German singer Ivan Rebroff lived at the edge of the Hunodstal Valley.
- The German writer Gerhard Zwerenz lived in Arnoldshain.
