= Weilrod =

- Municipality
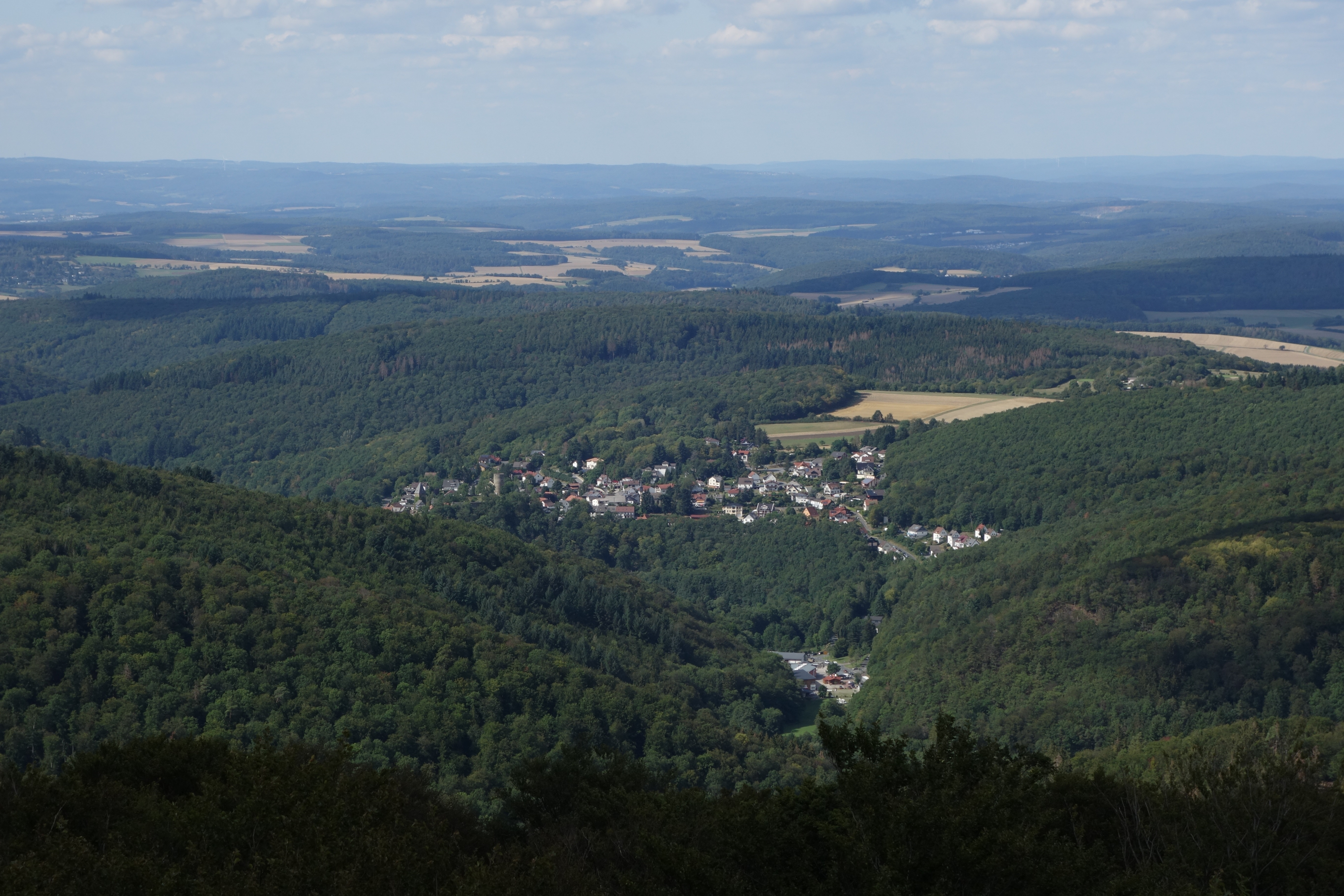
- District Altweilnau as seen from the observation tower on top of Pferdskopf mountain, south of Weilrod

- Flag Coat of arms

- Location of Weilrod within Hochtaunuskreis district
- Interactive map of Weilrod
- Location within Germany Location within Hesse
- Coordinates: 50°20′N 8°25′E
- Country: Germany
- State: Hesse
- Admin. region: Darmstadt
- District: Hochtaunuskreis

Government
  - Mayor (2017–23): Götz Esser (FW)

Area
  - Total: 71.16 km^{2} (27.48 sq mi)
- Elevation: 210–626 m (689–2,054 ft)

Population (2025-12-31)
  - Total: 6,847
  - Density: 96.22/km^{2} (249.2/sq mi)
- Time zone: UTC+01:00 (CET)
  - Summer (DST): UTC+02:00 (CEST)
- Postal codes: 61276
- Dialling codes: 06083, 06084
- Vehicle registration: HG, USI
- Website: www.weilrod.de

Weilrod is a municipality made up of several villages in the northwest Hochtaunuskreis lying in the Weil Valley in Hesse, Germany.

== Geography ==
=== Location ===
Weilrod lies north of the crest of the Taunus, from 210 to 600 m above sea level. The nearest bigger towns are Limburg (25 km) in the west, Wetzlar (30 km) in the north, Wiesbaden (35 km) in the south and Frankfurt am Main (35 km) in the southeast.

=== Neighbouring communities ===
Weilrod borders in the north on the communities of Weilmünster (Limburg-Weilburg) and Grävenwiesbach, in the east on the town of Usingen, in the south on the communities of Schmitten (all in the Hochtaunuskreis) and Waldems (Rheingau-Taunus-Kreis), and in the west on the town of Bad Camberg and the community of Selters (both in Limburg-Weilburg).

=== Constituent communities ===
The community has 13 centres named Altweilnau, Cratzenbach, Emmershausen, Finsternthal, Gemünden, Hasselbach, Mauloff, Niederlauken, Neuweilnau, Oberlauken, Rod an der Weil, Riedelbach and Winden.

== History ==
The earliest written record of a village in the area is of Mauloff ("Mulefo") in 1156. The imposing round tower at the castle ruins in Altweilnau has been dated to about 1200.

The merger of the individual communities into the greater community of Weilrod took place in 1972.

== Community's name ==
The name Weilrod stems on the one hand from the river Weil, a brook that forms Weilrod's and neighbouring Schmitten's landscape, and on the other hand from the German word Roden – "clearing".

Both these name stems are also found in constituent communities' names:

- Neu- and Altweilnau (Weil + Aue ["floodplain"])
- Rod an der Weil (Rod(-en) + Weil)
- Riedelbach (Roden + Bach ["brook"])

The village of Mauloff has an interesting name origin, according to the local lore. Since the name Mauloff does not fit any German name pattern, it affords fodder for legends and quaint stories. One of these stories holds that the village was originally nameless, and that to give it a name, the mayor called a meeting, deciding that the first word out of anyone's mouth would be the village's new name. Those gathered for the meeting, however, sat there without uttering a word. At last, the mayor ran out of patience and shouted "Maul off!" (roughly "Mouth open!" ie "Say something!", using Maul – more commonly the zoological word for mouth – and off, a variant of auf).

Mauloff had its first documentary mention in 1156 as "Mulefo", a stopping place on the mediaeval road through the heights, the Rennstraße.

== Politics ==
=== Municipal council ===
The municipal elections on 26 March 2006 yielded the following results:

SPD	10 seats
CDU	9 seats
FWG	8 seats
Greens	3 seats
FDP	1 seat

Note: FWG is a citizens' coalition.

== Economy ==
During the economic boom in the 1950s, the villages that now make up Weilrod were a favourite local recreation area for people who lived in the nearby Frankfurt Rhein-Main Region. Since then, tourism has dropped off noticeably. Nevertheless, the landscape in the municipal area attracts hikers and cyclists, for which a certain amount of credit must go to the Weiltalweg, a trail through the Weil Valley.

The loudspeaker manufacturer Canton Elektronik GmbH was founded in Weilrod and still has its headquarters there. Other companies in the community are Mania (tool technology), Grünauer Maschinen GmbH and AZ (Armaturen-Zimmermann, founded in Hasselbach).
