= Hilde Eiserhardt =

Hilde Eiserhardt (February 24, 1888, in Esch (Waldems) – April 6, 1955, in Frankfurt) was a German lawyer in a leading role at the German Association for Public and Private Welfare. At the German Association for Public and Private Welfare (DV), Eiserhardt was a speaker from 1919, and then from 1922 to 1936 deputy managing director of the DV under Wilhelm Polligkeit. She was a vehement proponent of a never-issued preservation law, which should regulate the legal, basis for a compulsory placement of the so-called "anti-social" and "inferior".
