= Christian-Wirth-Schule =

Secondary school in Usingen, Germany

Coordinates: 50.3345°N 8.5390°E

Christian-Wirth-Schule (Christian Wirth School) is a secondary school located in Usingen, Germany. Originally established as a school of education (German historical designation: Lehrerbildungsanstalt für evangelische Seminaristen) in 1851, it was later renamed in 1922 to Christian-Wirth-Schule, named after the accomplished attorney at law, Christian Wirth, who resided in the area.

CWS publishes its own independent newspaper called the Knorke. ("Knorke" is a German slang word comparable to modern day slang usage of the word "cool" in the English language which dates as far back as the 1920s.)
