= Guimond de Moulins =

11th-century lord from Normandy

Guimond de Moulins (in Italian: Guidomondo De Molisio, Guidmondo De Molisio, or Guimondo De Molisio) was an 11th century lord from Normandy, and the progenitor of the Italo-Norman nobility family De Molisio, which is said to have given its name to the region of Molise in Southern Italy.

== Biography ==
In the 1040s and 1050s, during the reign of William the Bastard, Duke of Normandy, Guimond, described as a "marquis" (in Low Latin marchio, lord of a march), was the lord of Castrum Molinis, located in the western part of the Duchy of Normandy (region of Mortagne-au-Perche). This is present-day Moulins-la-Marche, located in the department of Orne.

Writers of the time describe Guimond as one of the bravest captains of his day, though with a turbulent and violent nature.

He betrayed Duke William (later William the Conqueror) by supporting a French-backed rebellion in 1052 and handed over his fortress to King Henry I of France, an ally of William of Arques, who stationed a French garrison there. After the surrender of William of Arques in 1054, Guimond was likely pardoned by the Duke. According to William of Poitiers, the conspirators were granted ducal pardon, "with a mild or even no punishment". However, his sons were excluded from their paternal inheritance, and Duke William granted the castle of Moulins to William, son of Walter of Falaise, to whom he also gave the hand of Aubrée, daughter of Guimond.

However, other accounts state that after the rebellion failed, William confiscated Guimond's lands and denied his sons noble inheritance, effectively ending his lineage's prominence in Normandy. Most of his sons migrated to southern Italy, where they established the De Molisio family, influencing the region now known as Molise. Guimond’s daughter, Alberada, married strategically but later became a nun.

== Family and descendants ==
From his wife Emma, Guimond de Moulins had at least 9 children: eight sons, nearly all of whom emigrated to southern Italy, and one daughter who married Norman lord Raoul Taisson:

- Rodulfus (Rudolf, Rodolphe, Raoul), who is said to have accompanied Robert Guiscard to Italy around 1047. Count of Bojano around 1053;
- Rodbertus (Robert);
- Antonius (Antoine);
- Guimundus (Guimond), who was excommunicated in 1067 by Pope Alexander II along with two other Norman adventurers, Turgis of Rota and William of Hauteville, after seizing property belonging to the Roman Catholic Church in the region of Salerno;
- Hugo (Hugo, Hugues);
- Alannus (Alan, Alain);
- Guillelmus (William);
- Toresgaudus (Thorgot, Torgot, Turgot);
- Alberada (Aubrée): married Raoul Taisson, one of the leaders of the baronial revolt before the Battle of Val-ès-Dunes in 1047 (though he rallied in extremis to the young Duke William of Normandy); then, according to Orderic Vitalis, after being widowed and with a minor son, she was married by the Duke to a certain William, son of Walter of Falaise, maternal uncle of the Duke of Normandy.
