= Sainte-Gauburge-Sainte-Colombe =

- Commune
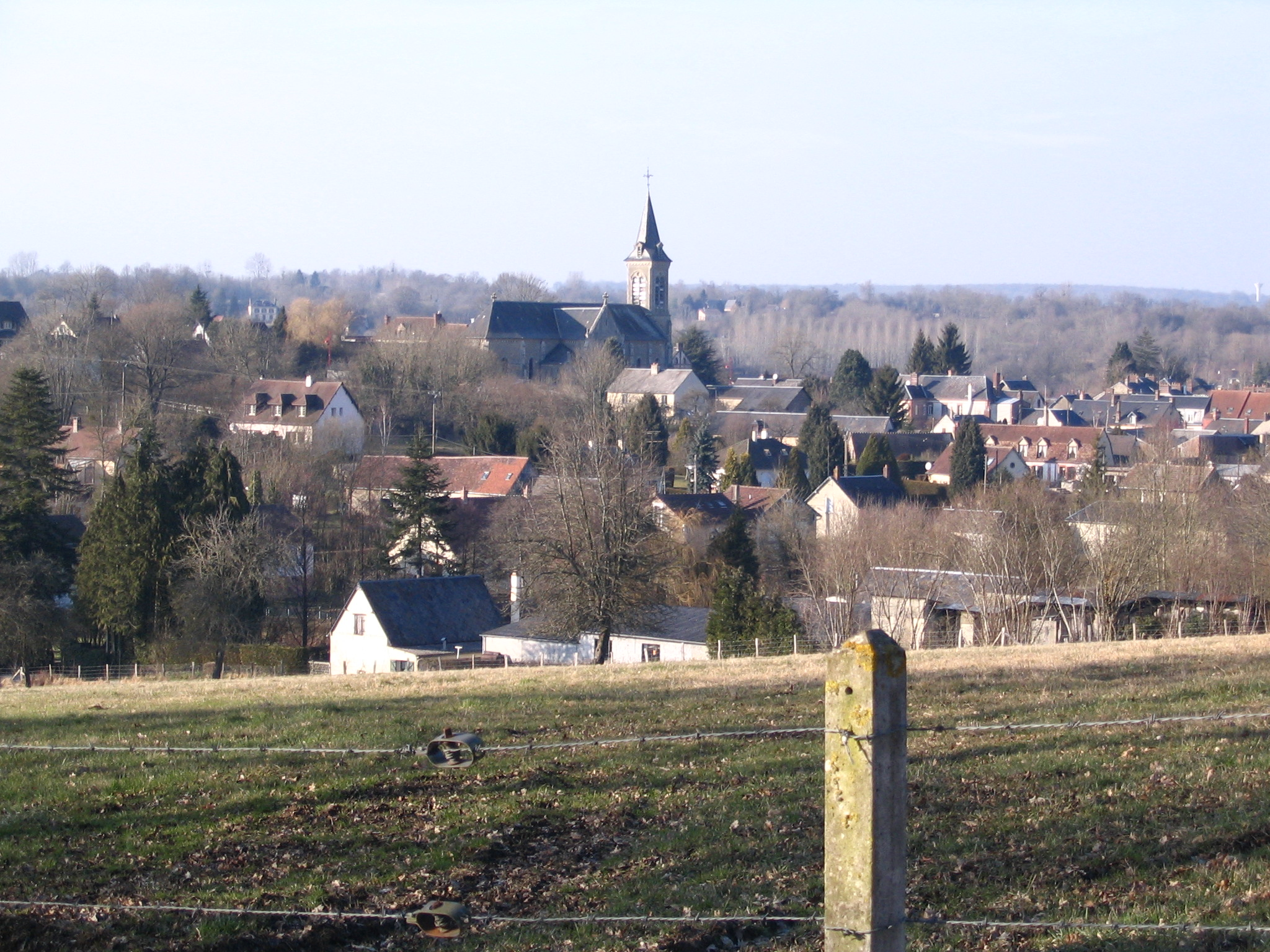
- A general view of Sainte-Gauburge-Sainte-Colombe
- Location of Sainte-Gauburge-Sainte-Colombe
- Location within France Location within Normandy
- Coordinates: 48°42′55″N 0°25′53″E
- Country: France
- Region: Normandy
- Department: Orne
- Arrondissement: Mortagne-au-Perche
- Canton: Rai

Government
  - Mayor (2020–2026): Philippe Bigot
- Area^{1}: 21.17 km^{2} (8.17 sq mi)
- Elevation: 246 m (807 ft)
- Highest elevation: 314 m (1,030 ft)
- Lowest elevation: 223 m (732 ft)
- Population (2023): 1,006
  - Density: 47.52/km^{2} (123.1/sq mi)
- Time zone: UTC+01:00 (CET)
  - Summer (DST): UTC+02:00 (CEST)
- INSEE/Postal code: 61389 /61370
- ^{1} French Land Register data, which excludes lakes, ponds, glaciers > 1 km^{2} (0.386 sq mi or 247 acres) and river estuaries.

Sainte-Gauburge-Sainte-Colombe (French pronunciation: [sɛ̃t ɡobyʁʒ sɛ̃t kɔlɔ̃b]) is a commune in the Orne department in north-western France.

== Geography ==
The Commune is one of 27 communes that make up the Natura 2000 protected area of Bocages et vergers du sud Pays d'Auge.

The river Risle flows through the commune. In addition the stream, Ruisseau du Choisel traverses through the commune.

== Twin towns – sister cities ==
Sainte-Gauburge-Sainte-Colombe, along with Moulins-la-Marche and Courtomer is twinned with:

- Schmitten, Germany

== Transport ==
Sainte-Gauburge station has rail connections to Argentan, Paris and Granville.

== See also ==
- Communes of the Orne department
