= Usingen =

- Town
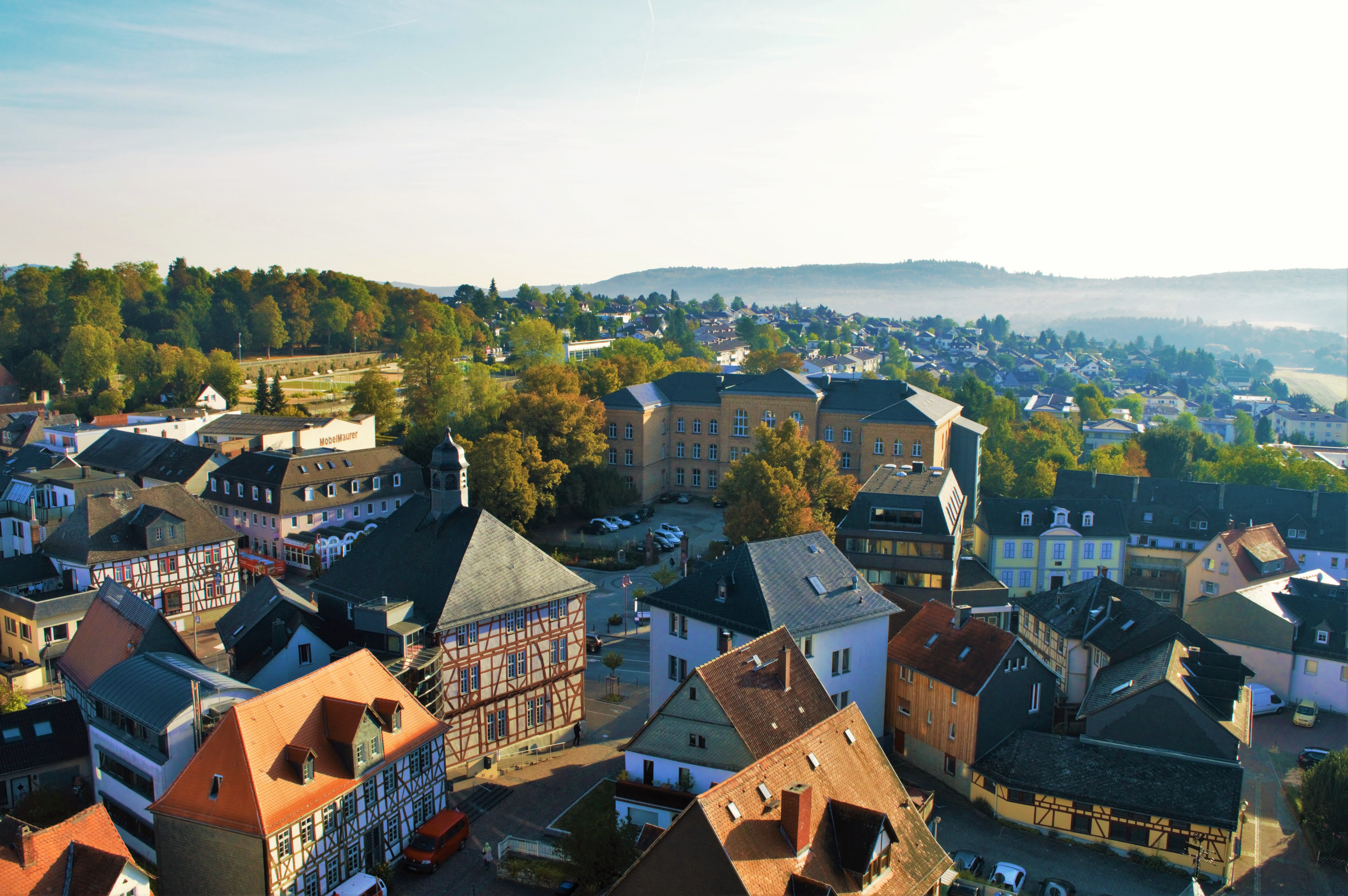
- City centre

- Flag Coat of arms

- Location of Usingen within Hochtaunuskreis district
- Interactive map of Usingen
- Location within Germany Location within Hesse
- Coordinates: 50°20′04″N 8°32′15″E
- Country: Germany
- State: Hesse
- Admin. region: Darmstadt
- District: Hochtaunuskreis
- Subdivisions: 7 Stadtteile

Government
  - Mayor (2022–28): Steffen Wernard (CDU)

Area
  - Total: 55.81 km^{2} (21.55 sq mi)
- Elevation: 269 m (883 ft)

Population (2025-12-31)
  - Total: 15,589
  - Density: 279.3/km^{2} (723.4/sq mi)
- Time zone: UTC+01:00 (CET)
  - Summer (DST): UTC+02:00 (CEST)
- Postal codes: 61250
- Dialling codes: 06081
- Vehicle registration: HG, USI
- Website: www.usingen.de

Usingen (German pronunciation: [ˈuːzɪŋən]) is a small town in the Hochtaunuskreis in Hessen, Germany. Until 1972, this residential and school town was the seat of the former district of Usingen.

== Coat of arms ==
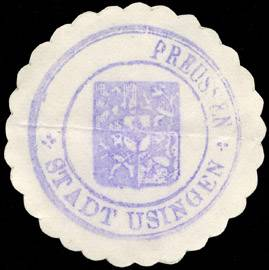
Seal around 1900

The earliest seal whose appearance is known – there had been earlier ones, but what they looked like is unknown – dates from 1277 and shows the four lions (golden ones denoting Nassau; silver ones denoting Saarbrücken), since the town was ruled then by the Counts of Nassau-Saarbrücken. Later seals did not show the billets and crosses with which the fields are spangled, but they reappeared in 1935, when the current arms were conferred. An earlier town symbol, a cloverleaf (or heraldically, a trefoil), may explain the charge on the inescutcheon. This was also added to the arms in 1935.

== Geography ==
=== Geographical setting ===
Usingen lies on the Usa River in the Usinger Becken at the north-eastern edge of the Taunus. It is located about 30 km north of Frankfurt am Main, 27 km south of Wetzlar and 38 km northeast of Wiesbaden, putting it on the edge of the Frankfurt Rhein-Main Region.

The town core is about 300 m above sea level. The highest elevation in the main town of Usingen is the Hohe Berg ("High Mountain"), 414 m above sea level.

=== Neighbouring communities ===
Usingen borders in the north and east on the Wetteraukreis (town of Butzbach and community of Ober-Mörlen), in the southeast on the community of Wehrheim, in the south on the town of Neu-Anspach and the community of Schmitten, in the west on the community of Weilrod and in the northwest on the community of Grävenwiesbach.

== History ==
Usingen (Latin Osinga), which in Frankish times likely existed as a fortified stopping place at an old crossroads, was first mentioned in the Codex Eberhardi, a manuscript from the Fulda monastery, and it is generally accepted that references made to the town go back to between 754 and 802. Archaeological proof of a settlement on the modern town's site back in Carolingian times has yet to be unearthed, although, not far from town, the remains of a Carolingian courtyard were once dug up. The possibility therefore exists that today's Usingen might not lie on the same spot as it once did, having relocated at some time in the past. More investigation will be needed before this is ascertained.

In 1207, being on the outskirts of the Usinger Land, it passed into the ownership of the Counts of Diez, who had acquired this Imperial estate in exchange for Mainz-Kastell (fort).

A Nassau castle – in 1326, the Counts of Nassau had acquired the Usinger Land by pledge, and by 1405 for good – on the site of today's Christian-Wirth-Schule (school) and a wall with five towers protected this small weaving town in the Middle Ages.

It is likely that Usingen was granted town rights in the 14th century.

As of 1659, the Counts resided in the castle, now converted into a stately home with a lovely garden, and from 1688 to 1744 the Princes of Nassau-Usingen lived there.

One prominent personage in Usingen's history was Fürst (Prince) Walrad. When Nassau-Saarbrücken lands were being divided up on 31 March 1659, Count Walrad got the Usinger Land. He governed for 43 years and was a respected commander, among other things field marshal of the Dutch States Army under William III of Orange. His period of rule was a decisive factor in making Usingen the way it is today, since after the Thirty Years' War and the three town fires in the 17th century – with their attendant drop in population – he settled Huguenots in the town and had the New Town built.

Another personage worthy of note was the violinist August Wilhelmj. He was made an honorary citizen of Usingen on 31 March 1876 on the occasion of his last concert in the town of his birth – Usingen. He was born there on 21 September 1845. The house where he was born stood at the lower end of the Rathauspassage, now called Wilhelmjstraße in his honour. On the lot where the house stood, where a bank building now stands, a memorial stone with a plaque recalls the important violinist.

Usingen was until 1886 the seat of an Amt and thereafter, until 1972 a district seat. The scant industrial development in modern times could not even be strengthened by the railway connection that came in 1895. Usingen has been since the time of the Reformation a school town: Latin school until 1817, teachers' college from 1851 to 1926, Christian-Wirth-Schule (Gymnasium) since 1926 – today together with many other kinds of school.

As part of municipal reform, the communities of Usingen, Eschbach, Kransberg, Merzhausen, Michelbach, Wernborn and Wilhelmsdorf merged in 1972 into the town of Usingen. Even after losing its function as district seat (Usingen district was merged with Obertaunus district to form the Hochtaunuskreis with its seat at Bad Homburg) Usingen is more than ever the midpoint of the Usinger Land.

== Politics ==
=== Town council ===
	SPD	CDU	Greens	FDP	BEU	FWG
2006	8	20	3	2	2	2

Note: FWG is a citizens' coalition.

=== Partnerships ===
Usingen maintains partnerships with the following places:

- Overbetuwe, Netherlands
- Chassieu, France

== Sightseeing ==
=== Usinger Schloss ===
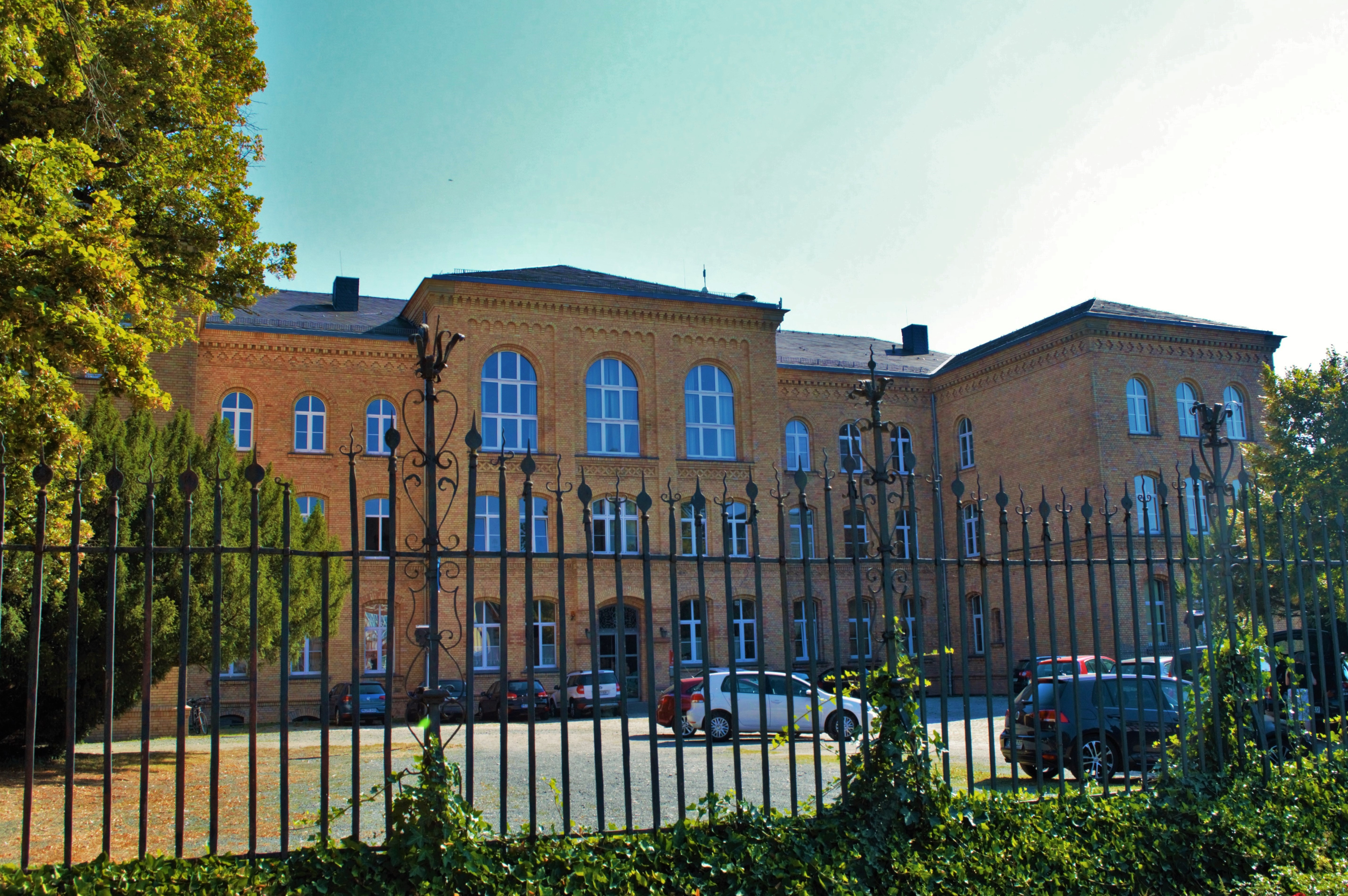
Schloss Usingen

In the middle of downtown Usingen is Usingen's stately home, the Usinger Schloss. The home's exact origins have yet to be fully explained. It is assumed that it was built in the 14th century as a castle under Johann I of Nassau-Weilburg. Prince Walrad had a new stately home built on the castle's site in 1660–1663. The architect Friedrich Joachim Stengel (1694–1787) remodelled the Usinger Schloss into a Baroque residence between 1733 and 1738 as instructed by Princess Charlotte Amalie, Prince Wilhelm Heinrich I's widow. In 1873, a great fire destroyed the Schloss, which was afterwards built anew.

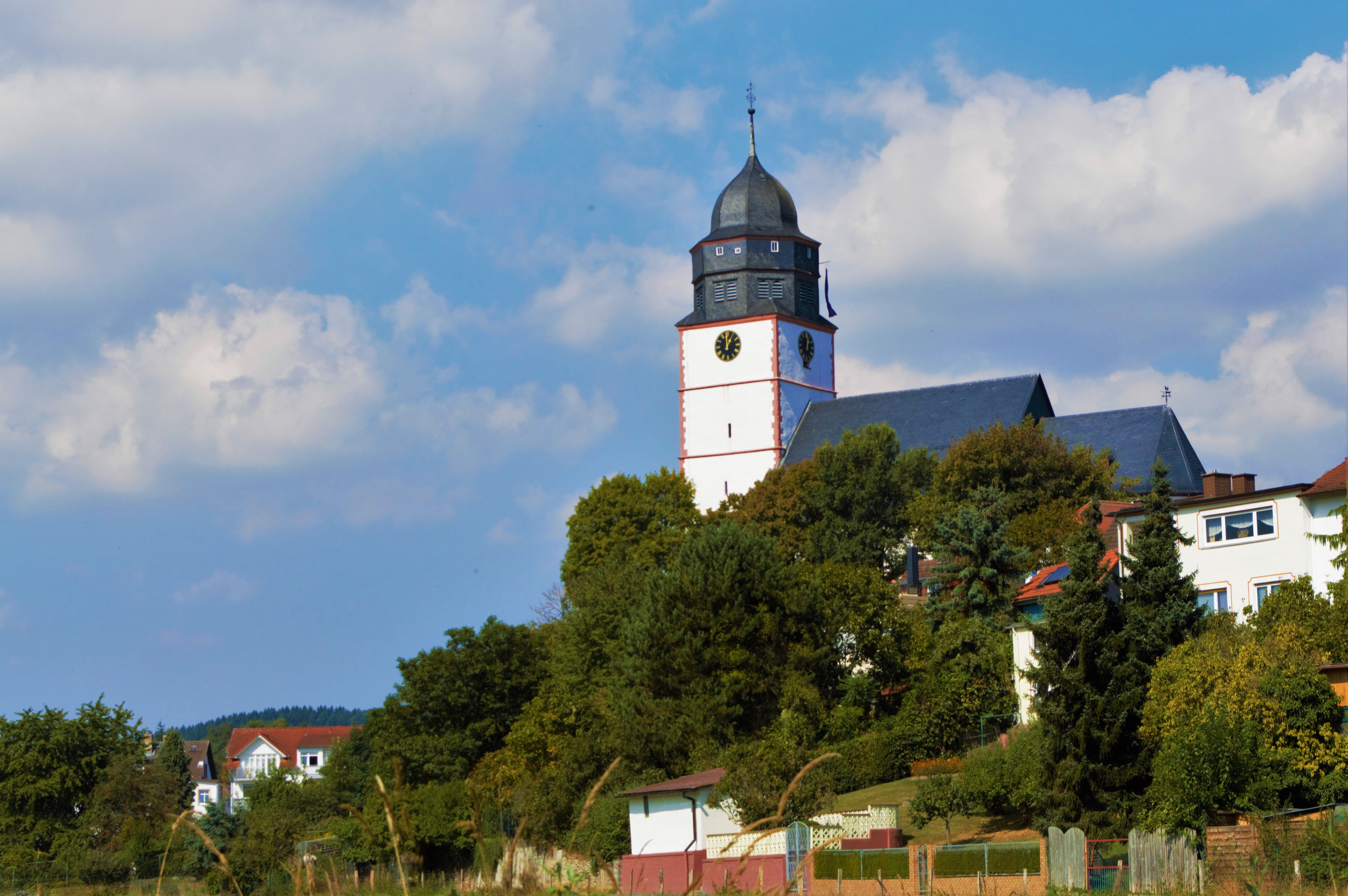
Evangelische Laurentiuskirche

Today it is used as a Gymnasium (Christian-Wirth-Schule). Bordering right on the Schloss is the Usinger Schlossgarten, the stately home garden.

=== Evangelische Laurentiuskirche ===
The main church of Usingen is the Evangelische Laurentiuskirche.

=== Huguenot church with marketplace ===
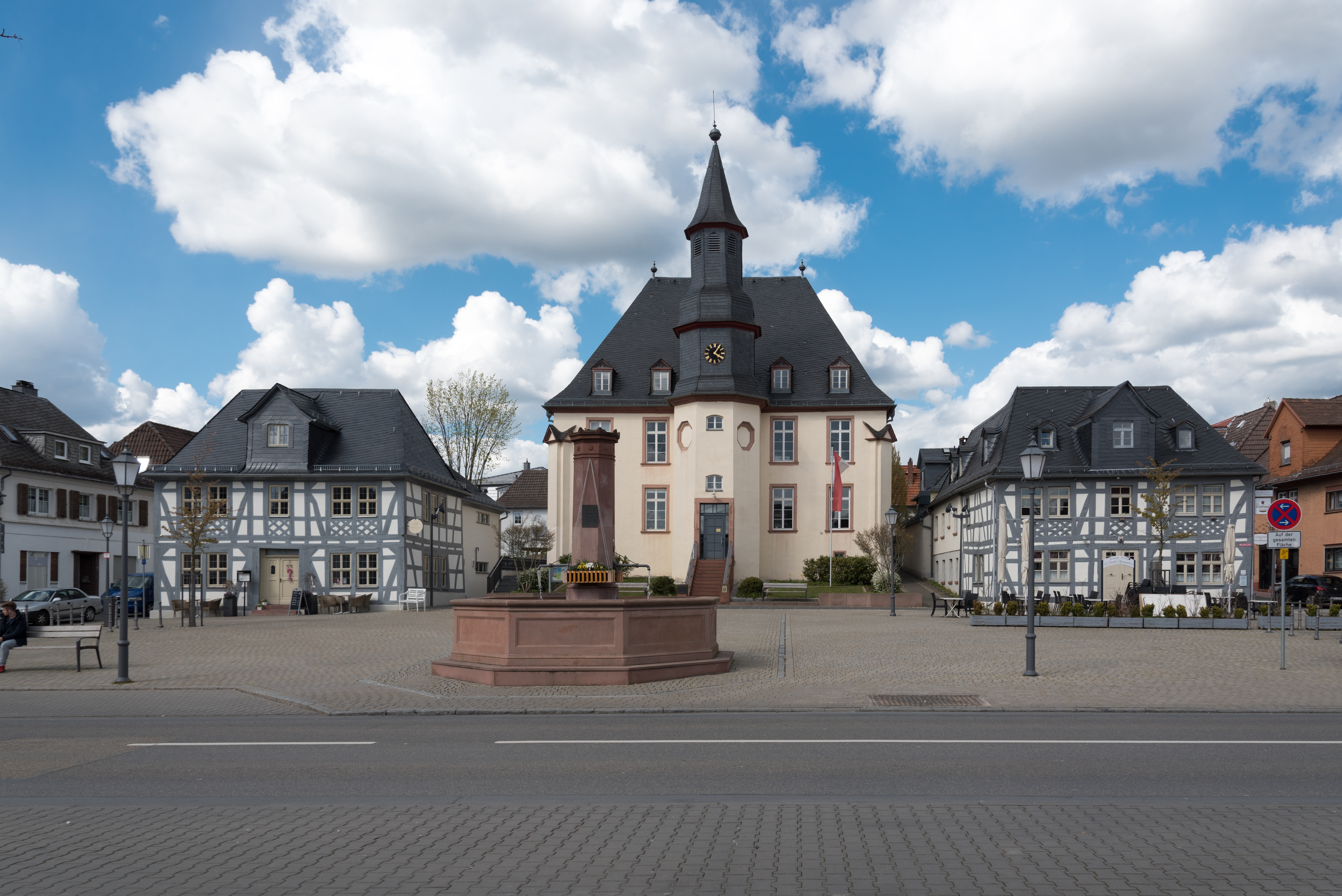
Huguenot church with marketplace

Another great fire in 1692 destroyed the so-called Usinger Oberstadt (Upper Town). The overlord at that time, Prince Walrad (1635–1702) gave orders for its prompt reconstruction. Symmetrical rows of houses, which still form the townscape now, were built, and along the Obergasse (Upper Lane) appeared representative buildings. The so-called New Town's heart was shaped by the Hugenottenkirche with what is nowadays the old marketplace. Benedikt Burtscher was the building master of the church, built in 1700 and showing in its building style certain commonalities with the well known church at La Rochelle. After the Huguenot church fell out of use with the union of the Lutheran Protestants and the Reformed Church, it was soon converted into a school. Today, however, it houses the Usingen library. On the upper floors are found many places where concerts and gatherings can be accommodated. The wedding room is a favourite place for couples to plight their troth.

=== Eschbacher Klippen ===
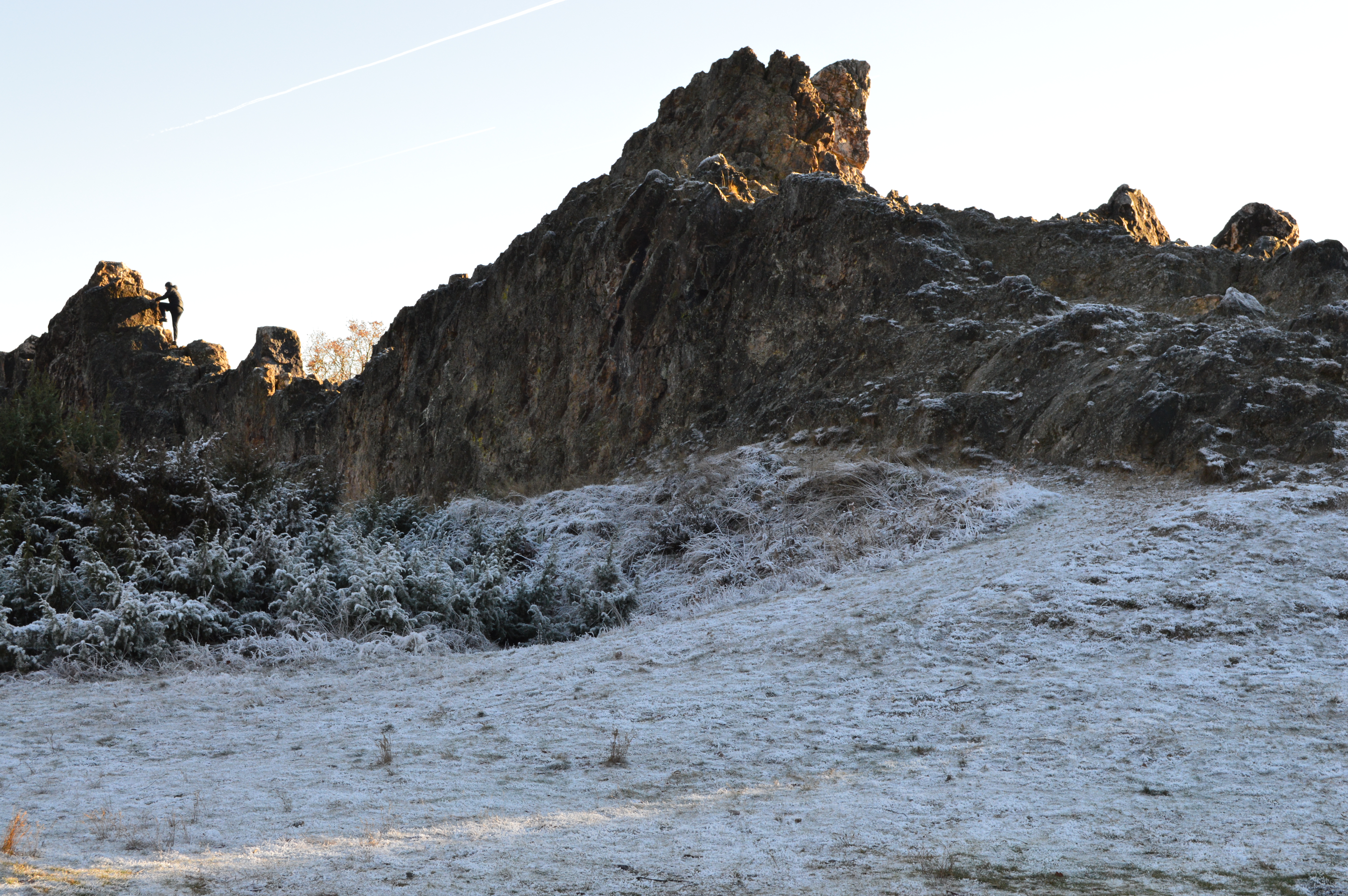
Eschbacher Klippen

At the north end of Eschbach stands a group of cliffs up to 12 m high and made of quartz. The cliff wall is the visible part of a roughly six-kilometre-long quartz seam which continues slantwise across the Usa Valley to the Wormstein in Usingen town forest. From a geological standpoint, it is an oblique upthrow (fault with one side thrust up higher than the other) formed by faulting in the mountain range. The erosion-resistant quartz has lasted to this day and can be seen in many places in the Taunus, but nowhere is it more spectacular than here.

Climbers use the steeper walls for training.

=== Hattsteinweiher ===
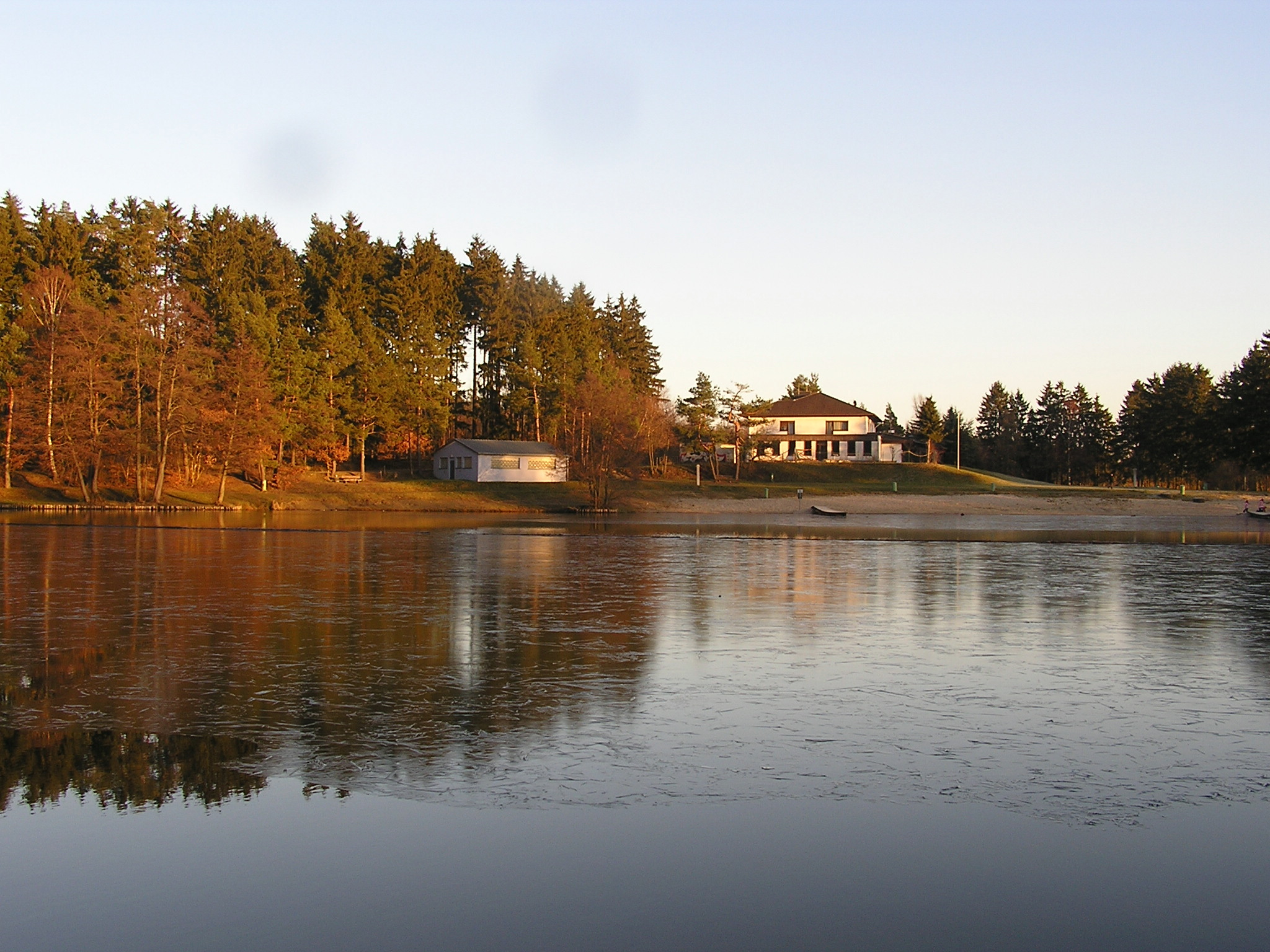
Hattsteinweiher

The Hattsteinweiher near Usingen is the only bathing lake in the Usinger Land. In summer, when the weather is good, it is the centre of attraction for many visitors from the Taunus and the Frankfurt Rhein-Main Region.

== Economy and infrastructure ==
=== Public transport ===
Usingen station has at its disposal a good connection to the public railway network. Whereas railway lines have been closed elsewhere, things have gone the other way in the Hochtaunuskreis. The line that has connected the Usinger Land to Frankfurt since 1895 has been run since 1993 by the district as the Taunusbahn. At peak hours, the trains run half-hourly, and otherwise hourly, to Bad Homburg. Peak hours also bring hourly through trains to Frankfurt's main railway station. Service stops at about 23:00 (0:00 on Saturday nights).

=== Further infrastructure ===
Usingen is the seat of an Amtsgericht (local district court) and home to a hospital.

=== Satellite Groundstation Using ===
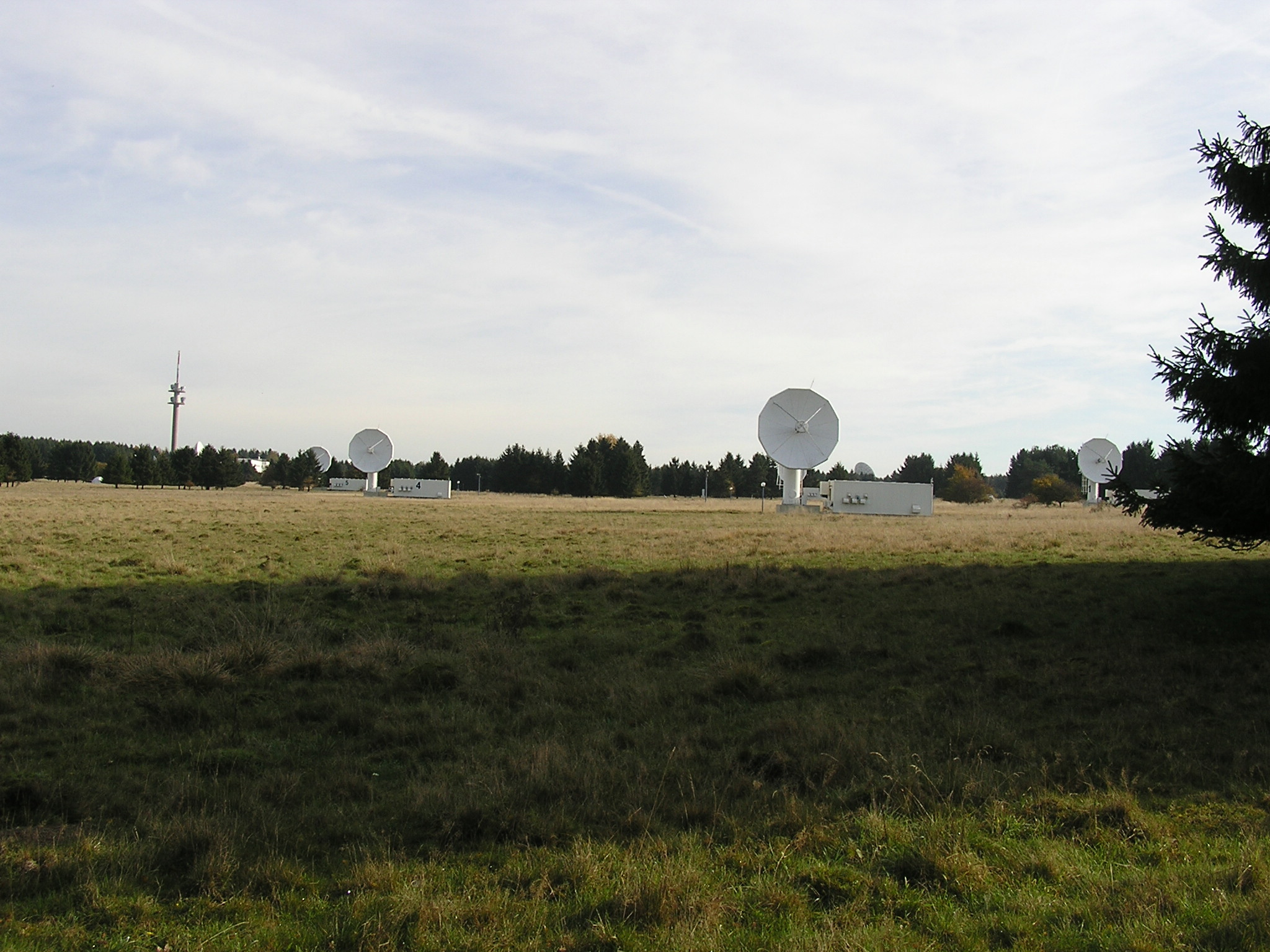
Satellite station and antenna farm

Usingen is home of one of the major commercial Satellite Groundstations in Germany. It is owned and operated by Media Broadcast Satellite GmbH (formerly T-Systems).

In 1953, the Deutsche Bundespost leased a 140-hectare area of forest and meadowland that had served as an ammunition depot and a field airfield during the Second World War—a site where, starting in June 1944, political prisoners from Luxembourg had been held in a subcamp of the Hinzert concentration camp near Trier. The "Usingen Overseas Radio Transmitting Station", a shortwave facility equipped with powerful transmitters capable of an output of up to 100 kW, designed for international telephone communications was built. The first parabolic antenna for satellite communication was build in 1979. The station houses more than 130 antennas.

Connectivity to DE-CIX in Frankfurt, the world’s largest internet exchange point as well as to terrestrial networks, expands the earth station’s transmission capabilities by providing redundant, hybrid solutions. Using Groundstation is one known Starlink Groundstation in Germany.

=== Regular events ===
Known far beyond Usingen's borders are the yearly Usinger Flohmarkt (flea market) in late June and the Usinger Laurentiusmarkt, every second weekend in September.

== Notable people ==
- around 1465: Bartholomaeus Arnoldi, Augustinian friar
- 1718: William Henry, Prince of Nassau-Saarbrücken
- 1839: Theodor Langhans, German pathologist
- 1845: August Wilhelmj, German violinist
- 1973: Kai Klose, German politician
- 1990: Mario Pokar, German footballer
- 1994: Sebastian Sommer, German politician
- 2003: Mara Guth, German tennis player

== Literature ==
- 1200 Jahre Usingen, articles about the former residence and district seat, ISBN 3-924103-21-6
- Waren "Osungen" und "Otsingen" wirklich Usingen? in: Usinger Anzeiger, 11 May 2002
