= Courtomer, Orne =

Courtomer
- Commune
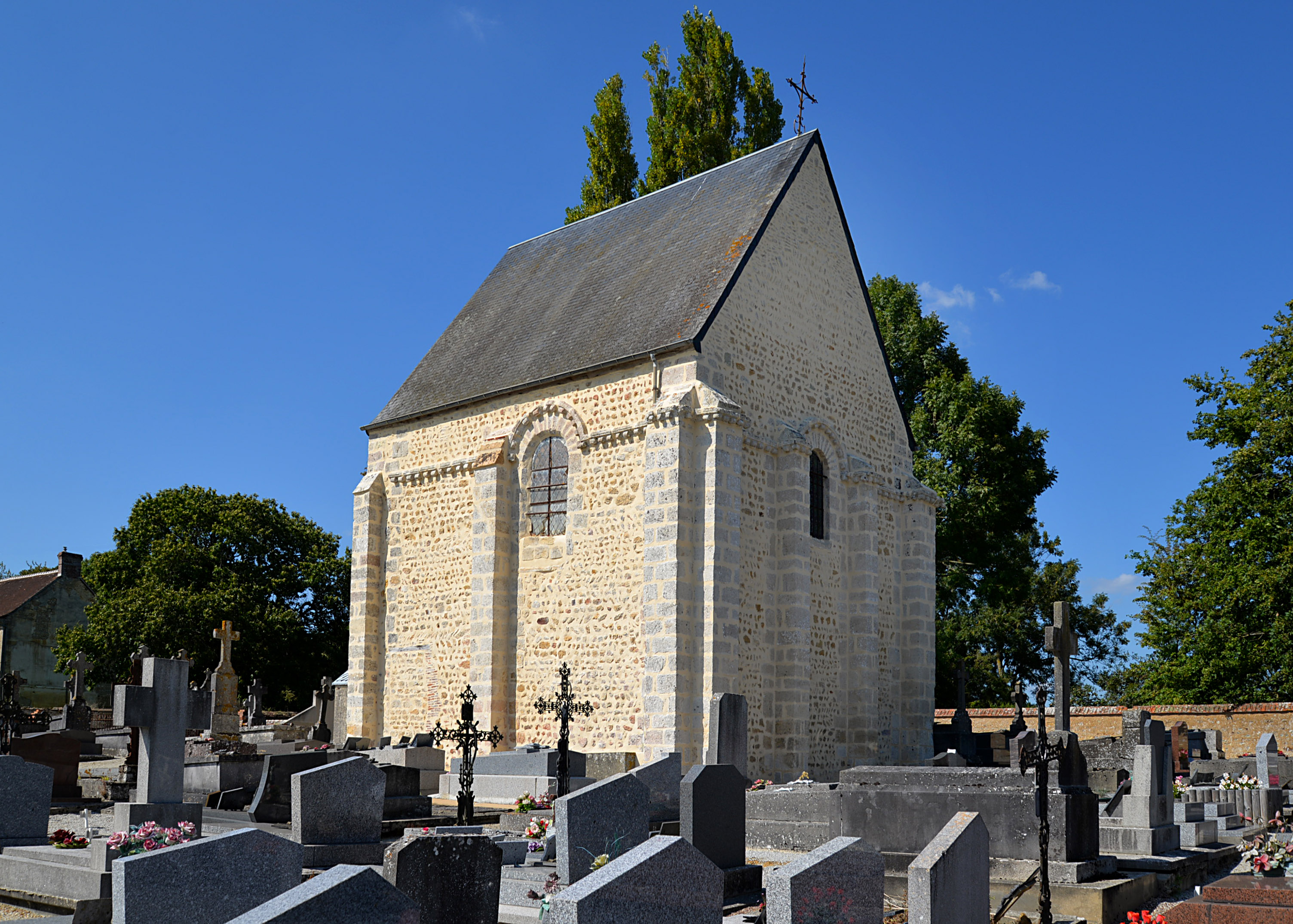
- The chapel in Courtomer

- Coat of arms
- Location of Courtomer
- Location within France Location within Normandy
- Coordinates: 48°37′45″N 0°21′32″E
- Country: France
- Region: Normandy
- Department: Orne
- Arrondissement: Alençon
- Canton: Écouves
- Intercommunality: Vallée de la Haute Sarthe

Government
  - Mayor (2020–2026): Robert Collette
- Area^{1}: 19.90 km^{2} (7.68 sq mi)
- Elevation: 203 m (666 ft)
- Highest elevation: 279 m (915 ft)
- Lowest elevation: 172 m (564 ft)
- Population (2023): 731
  - Density: 36.7/km^{2} (95.1/sq mi)
- Demonym: Courtomerois
- Time zone: UTC+01:00 (CET)
  - Summer (DST): UTC+02:00 (CEST)
- INSEE/Postal code: 61133 /61390
- ^{1} French Land Register data, which excludes lakes, ponds, glaciers > 1 km^{2} (0.386 sq mi or 247 acres) and river estuaries.

Courtomer (French pronunciation: [kuʁtɔmɛʁ]) is a commune in the Orne department in north-western France.

== Geography ==
The commune is made up of the following collection of villages and hamlets, Les Moutis, Courtomer, La Pitoudière, La Héberderie, L'Osier and La Bonneville.

The La Fresbee and le Guerne rivers flow through the commune.

== Points of interest ==
=== National heritage sites ===
- Château et temple protestant seventeenth century Protestant temple, that was registered as a Monument historique 1967.

== Notable people ==
- Alain Corbin (born 1936) - is a French historian who was born here.

== Heraldry ==
Arms of Courtomer	The arms of Courtomer are blazoned : Vert, 3 lions argent.

== Twin towns – sister cities ==
Courtomer, along with Sainte-Gauburge-Sainte-Colombe and Moulins-la-Marche is twinned with:

- Schmitten, Germany

== See also ==
- Communes of the Orne department
