= Moulins-la-Marche =

- Commune
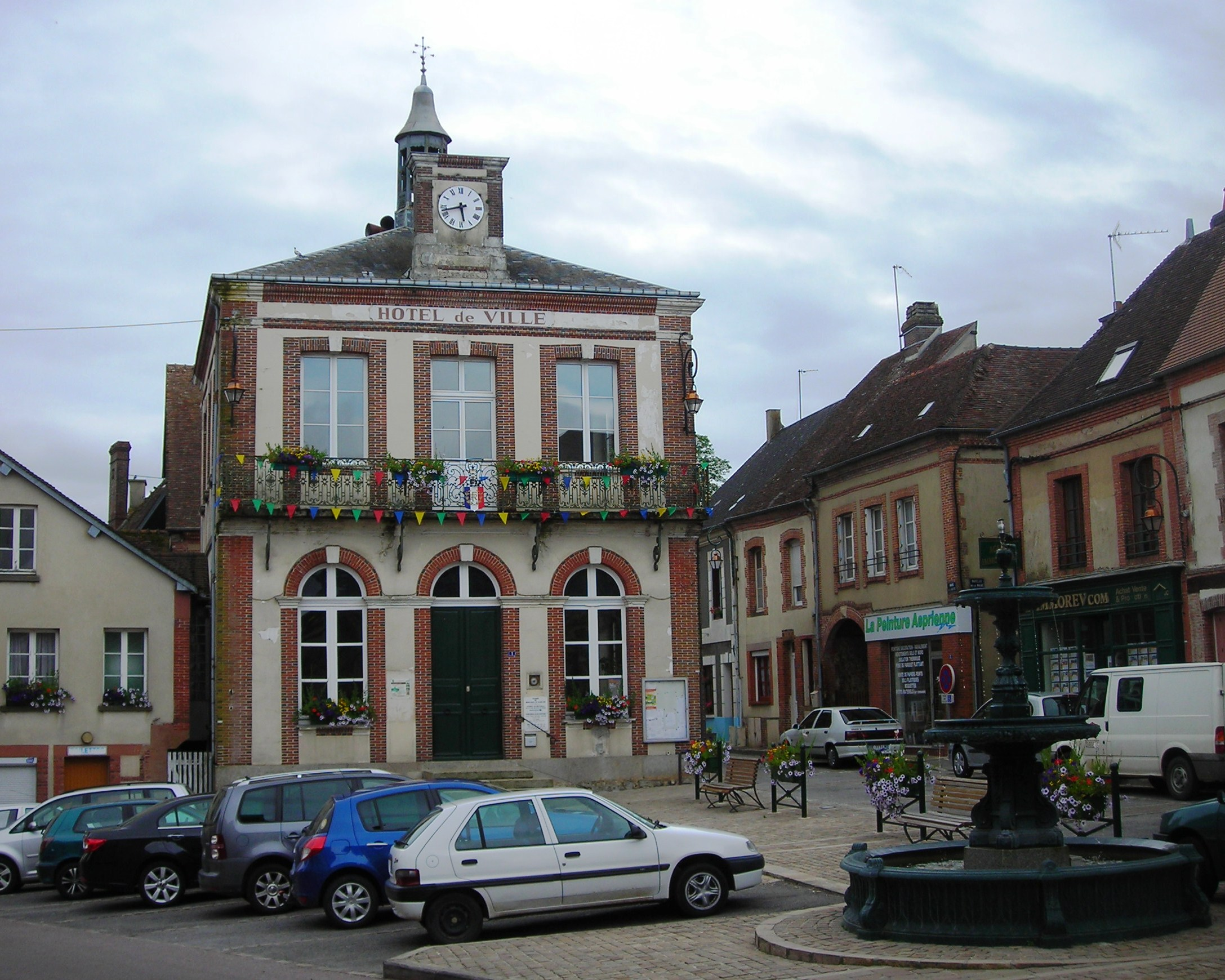
- The town hall in Moulins-la-Marche
- Location of Moulins-la-Marche
- Location within France Location within Normandy
- Coordinates: 48°39′00″N 0°28′37″E
- Country: France
- Region: Normandy
- Department: Orne
- Arrondissement: Mortagne-au-Perche
- Canton: Tourouvre au Perche
- Intercommunality: Pays de L'Aigle

Government
  - Mayor (2020–2026): Fabrice Gloria
- Area^{1}: 13.14 km^{2} (5.07 sq mi)
- Elevation: 277 m (909 ft)
- Highest elevation: 295 m (968 ft)
- Lowest elevation: 174 m (571 ft)
- Population (2023): 710
  - Density: 54/km^{2} (140/sq mi)
- Time zone: UTC+01:00 (CET)
  - Summer (DST): UTC+02:00 (CEST)
- INSEE/Postal code: 61297 /61380
- ^{1} French Land Register data, which excludes lakes, ponds, glaciers > 1 km^{2} (0.386 sq mi or 247 acres) and river estuaries.

Moulins-la-Marche is a commune in the Orne department in north-western France.

== Geography ==
The Commune is made up of the following collection of villages and hamlets, La Chalière and Moulins-la-Marche.

The Commune is one of 27 communes that make up the Natura 2000 protected area of Bocages et vergers du sud Pays d'Auge.

In addition the commune along with another 32 communes is part of the Natura 2000 conservation area, called the Haute vallée de la Sarthe.

The Sarthe river flows through the commune. The commune is the source of the river Iton. In addition two streams, Ruisseau de la Gaziniere and ruisseau de quincampoix also passes through the commune.

== Points of Interest ==
- Hippodrome Jean Gabin - The racetrack was created in 1959 by the actor Jean Gabin who owned land in the area. The venue hosts Harness racing. In 1989 the venue was used in the film Ripoux contre Ripoux.

== Notable people ==
Guimond de Moulins - an 11th century lord of Castrum Molinis which is now known as Moulins-la-Marche.

== Heraldry ==
Arms of Moulins-la-Marche	The arms of Moulins-la-Marche are blazoned : Azure, a windmill Or roofed gules.

== Twin towns – sister cities ==
Moulins-la-Marche, along with Sainte-Gauburge-Sainte-Colombe and Courtomer is twinned with:

- Schmitten, Germany

== See also ==
- Communes of the Orne department
