= Sebastian Sommer =

German politician (born 1994)

Member of the Landtag of Hesse
- Incumbent
- Assumed office 18 January 2024
- Preceded by: Jürgen Banzer
- Constituency: Hochtaunus II

Personal details
- Born: 24 January 1994 (age 32) Usingen
- Party: Christian Democratic Union (since 2008)

Sebastian Sommer (born 24 January 1994 in Usingen) is a German politician serving as a member of the Landtag of Hesse since 2024. From 2019 to 2024, he served as chairman of the Young Union in Hesse.
