= Sängelberg =

Mountain in Hesse, Germany

Coordinates: 50°15′37″N 8°26′10″E

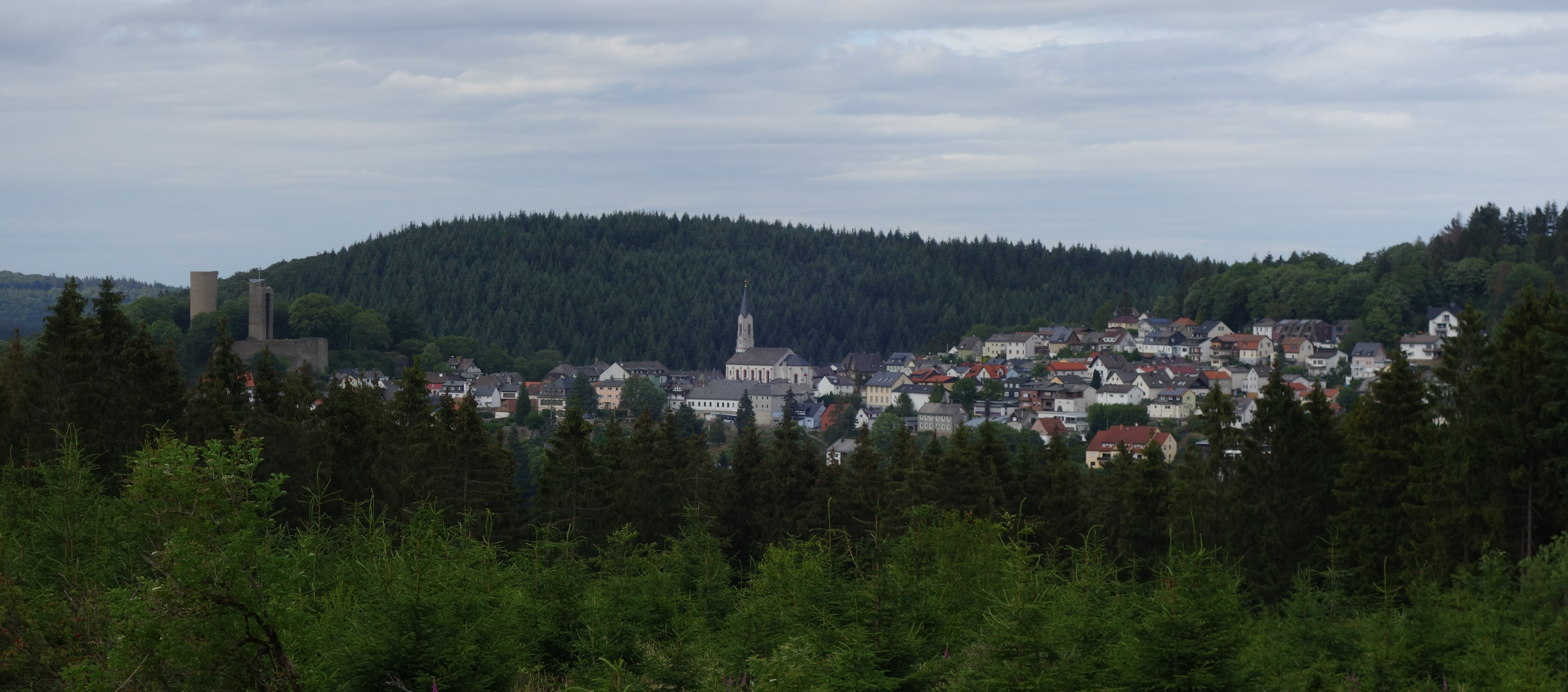
- Sängelberg over Oberreifenberg seen from the Hühnerberg, from the south-southeast.

Highest point
- Elevation: 665 m (2,182 ft)

Geography
- Location: Hesse, Germany

Sängelberg is a mountain of Hesse, Germany.
