= Waldems =

- Municipality
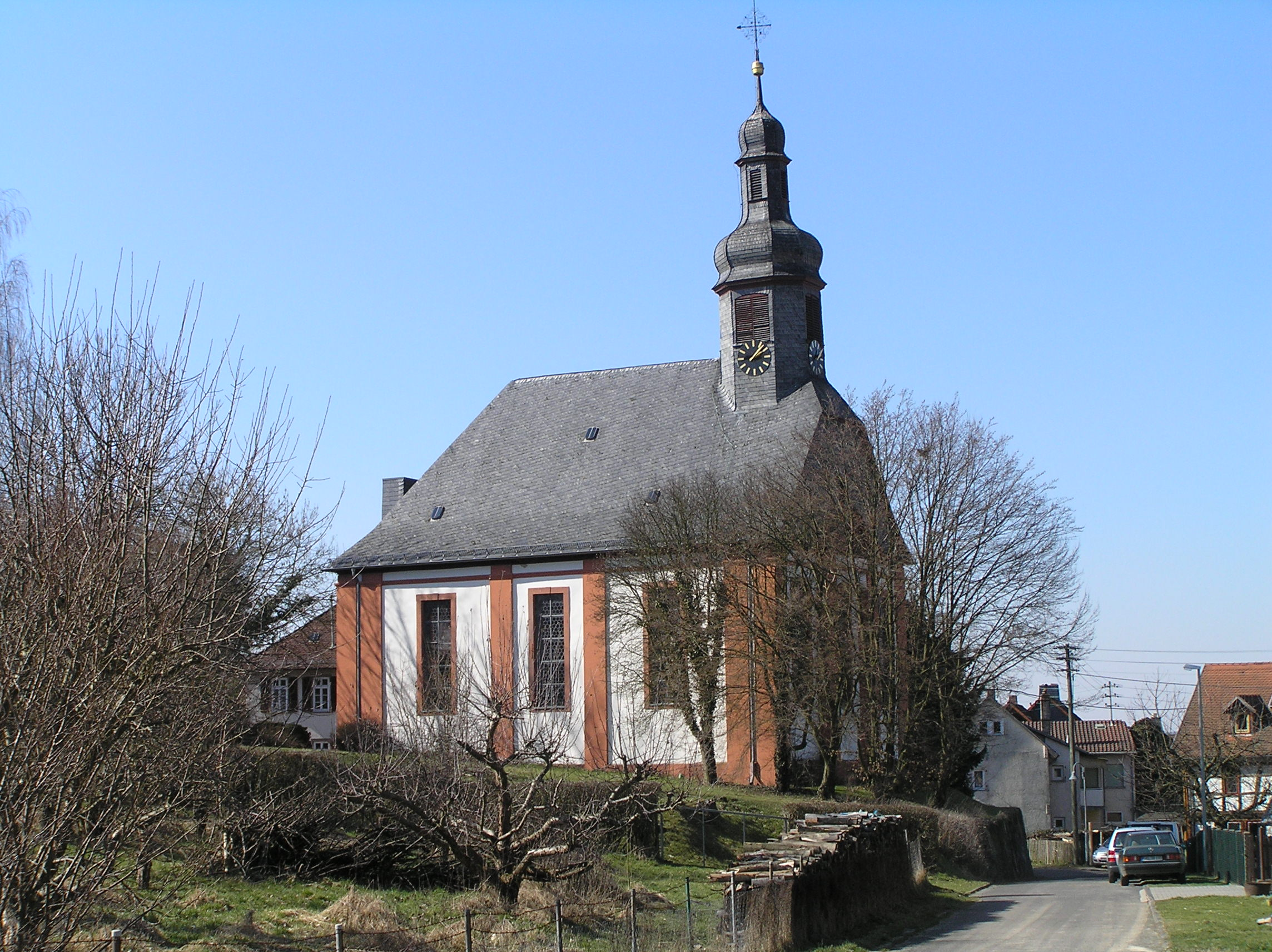
- Protestant church in Esch

- Coat of arms

- Location of Waldems within Rheingau-Taunus-Kreis district
- Interactive map of Waldems
- Location within Germany Location within Hesse
- Coordinates: 50°15′N 08°20′E
- Country: Germany
- State: Hesse
- Admin. region: Darmstadt
- District: Rheingau-Taunus-Kreis

Government
  - Mayor (2021–27): Markus Hies (CDU)

Area
  - Total: 36.68 km^{2} (14.16 sq mi)
- Elevation: 398 m (1,306 ft)

Population (2025-12-31)
  - Total: 5,314
  - Density: 144.9/km^{2} (375.2/sq mi)
- Time zone: UTC+01:00 (CET)
  - Summer (DST): UTC+02:00 (CEST)
- Postal codes: 65529
- Dialling codes: 06126, 06087, 06082
- Vehicle registration: RÜD
- Website: www.gemeinde-waldems.de

Waldems (German pronunciation: [ˈvaltˌɛms]) is a municipality in the Rheingau-Taunus-Kreis in the Regierungsbezirk of Darmstadt in Hesse, Germany. The municipality's administrative seat is Waldems-Esch.

== Geography ==
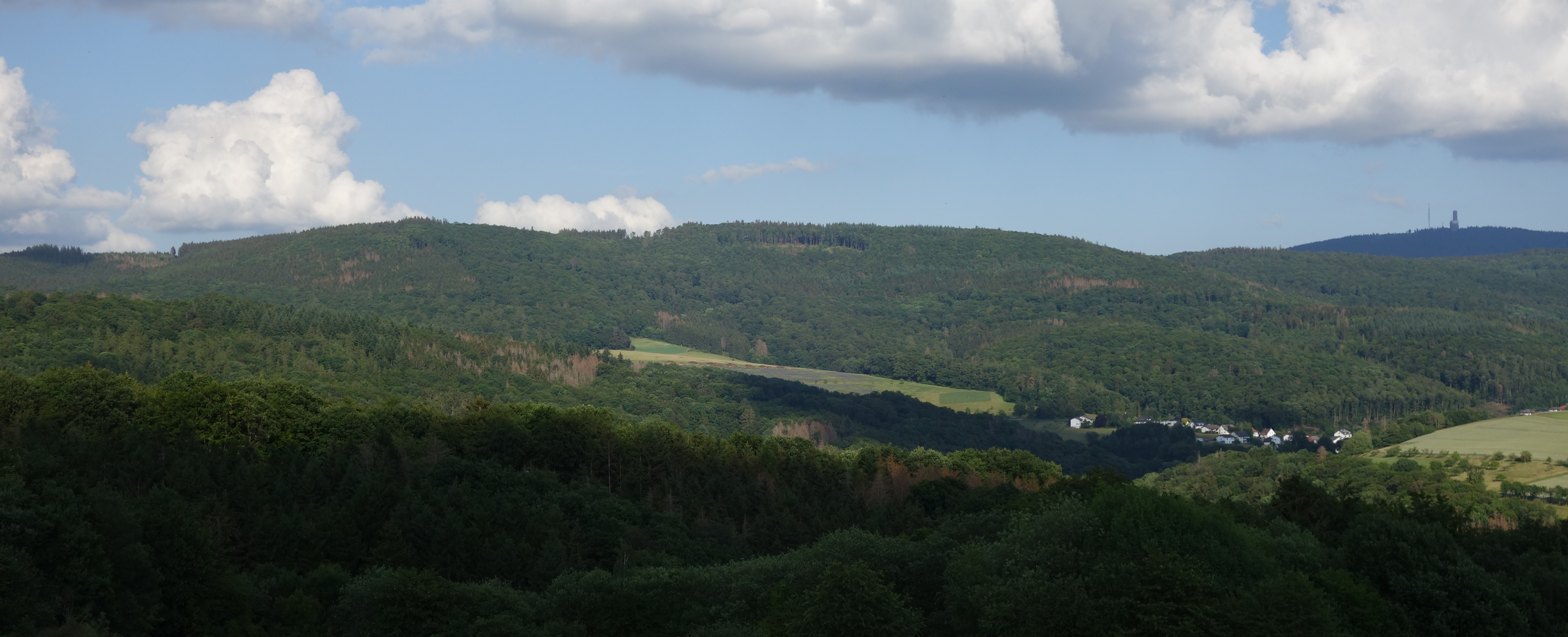
Mountain Windhain above Wüstems' roofs, as seen from the west; on the right in the back the mountain Großer Feldberg is visible

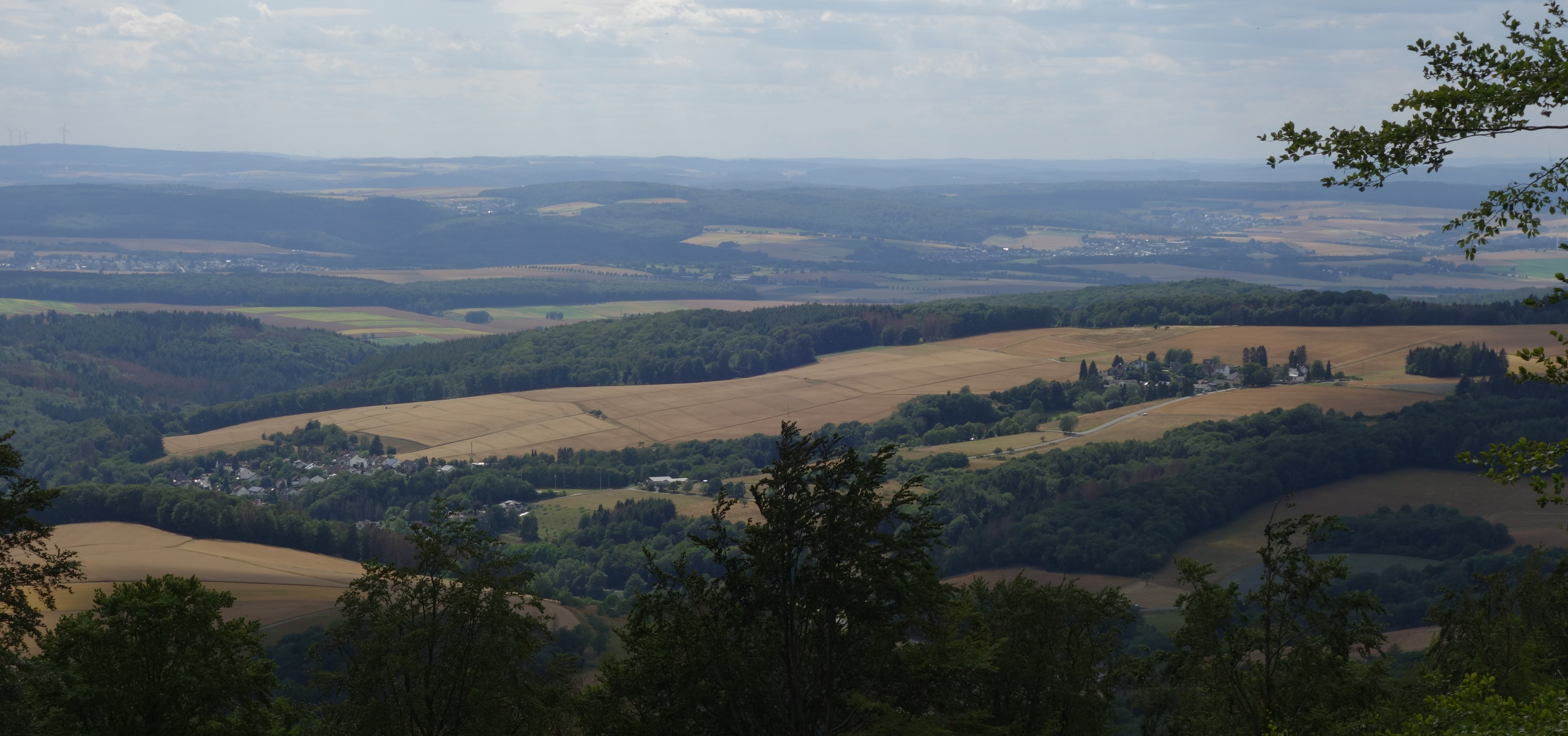
View from Windhain-mountain towards constituent communities Niederems and Reinborn

=== Location ===
Waldems is located in the Taunus in a widely wooded setting at the northwest foot of the Feldberg massif at 250 to 629.3 m above sea level, the southern hilltop of the mountain Windhain, which is the highest point of the district Rheingau-Taunus-Kreis, rising east of the constituent municipality of Wüstems.

=== Neighbouring communities ===
Waldems is the easternmost municipality in the Rheingau-Taunus-Kreis and borders in the northeast on the municipality of Weilrod, in the east on the municipality of Schmitten, in the southeast on the municipality of Glashütten (all three in the Hochtaunuskreis), in the south and west on the town of Idstein (Rheingau-Taunus-Kreis) and in the northwest on the town of Bad Camberg (Limburg-Weilburg).

=== Constituent communities ===
The municipality's six Ortsteile are Bermbach, Esch (administrative seat), Niederems (with Reinborn), Reichenbach, Steinfischbach and Wüstems.

== History ==
Although traces of settlement go far back, the current places in the municipality go back to clearing in Frankish times.

The first of the constituent communities to have a documentary mention was Bermbach, which was named as Barenbach in a document from the Lorsch codex in 772. For many centuries this was borderland; the Limes ran nearby, and later, the Electoral Mainz's, Hesse's and Nassau's spheres of influence all came up against each other here. From 1276 to 1570 the village was bound to the noble family of the Lords of Bermbach. Later, Bermbach was mentioned in connection with the persecution of witches and the legendary Schinderhannes (1801).

The constituent municipality of Esch goes back to a settlement from the 6th century, having had its first documentary mention as Eschze in the rent register of the archive deacon at Dietkirchen. Esch lies at the junction of the ancient Frankfurt-Limburg-Cologne trade road and the linking road between the Rhine and the Wetterau, and thereby always had a high traffic volume.

The story of how Niederems came to be can be traced back to 1274. Through hunger, pestilence and wars, the population figure was always very low. In particular, the Thirty Years' War reduced the number of households considerably.

Settlement in Reichenbach can be traced back to pre-Christian times. Worth mentioning are the barrow “Goldkessel” and the Celtic circular rampart. In 1428, the place was mentioned as Richinbach in the annals of Nassau-Idstein. In 1772, a fire destroyed the old village centre, although this was quickly rebuilt. From 1604 to 1968, Reichenbach had its own school.

Near the constituent municipality of Steinfischbach are found in the form of the barrows Totenkopf and Goldkessel clues to an early settlement. The village had its first documentary mention in 1156 under the name Vispach in a document from Archbishop Arnold of Mainz. Nearby there were iron ore prospecting and a quarry for millstones, road gravel, cobblestones and border stones.

Wüstems was mentioned in 1435 as Wosten Emsse in a record by Cuno von Reifenberg. The name's first syllable, Wüst, likely derives from Wüstungen (German for “abandoned settlements”) and refers to a forsaken village or rural area. The name of the brook, Ems, is from Old High German Ohm. Both these name elements point to a settlement period lasting more than 2,000 years. Also pointing to such a thing is the Celtic circular rampart on the nearby Taunus peak, Burg.

In 1806, the municipal area belonged to the Duchy of Nassau. In 1866 it passed to Prussia.

In the framework of municipal reform in Hesse, the hitherto self-governing communities of Bermbach, Esch, Niederems, Reichenbach, Steinfischbach and Wüstems merged in 1972 into today's greater municipality of Waldems.

== Politics ==
=== Municipality council ===
The municipal election held on 26 March 2006 yielded the following results:

Parties and voter communities		% 2006	Seats; 2006	% 2001	Seats; 2001
CDU	Christian Democratic Union of Germany	29.2	8	26.7	8
SPD	Social Democratic Party of Germany	34.3	9	37.3	12
GREENS	Bündnis 90/Die Grünen	10.0	3	6.4	2
FDP	Free Democratic Party	4.0	1	3.1	1
FWG	Freie Wählergemeinschaft	16.1	4	20.3	6
UWK	Unabhängiger Wählerkreis	6.3	2	6.2	2
Total		100.0	27	100.0	31
Voter turnout in %		52.2		58.0	

=== Town partnerships ===
The municipality of Waldems maintains partnerships with the following places:

- Saint-Bonnet-en-Champsaur, Hautes-Alpes, France since 1982
- Szikszó, Borsod-Abaúj-Zemplén County, Hungary since 1997

== Economy and infrastructure ==
Formerly, the villagers drew their livelihood from agriculture and forestry. In the latter half of the 20th century, though, Waldems converted itself into a residential municipality. Most workers earn their living, by way of the good transport links, in the Frankfurt Rhine Main Region.

=== Transport ===
The municipality is well linked to the long-distance road network through the Idstein Autobahn interchange on the A 3 (Cologne–Frankfurt), 8 km away. Furthermore, Bundesstraßen 8 and 275 run through the municipal area, crossing in Esch.

The nearest railway station is in Idstein on the Main-Lahn Railway. Stopping here is, among others, RMV line 20.
