= Pferdskopf (Taunus) =

Mountain in Germany

Coordinates: 50°17′25″N 8°26′05″E

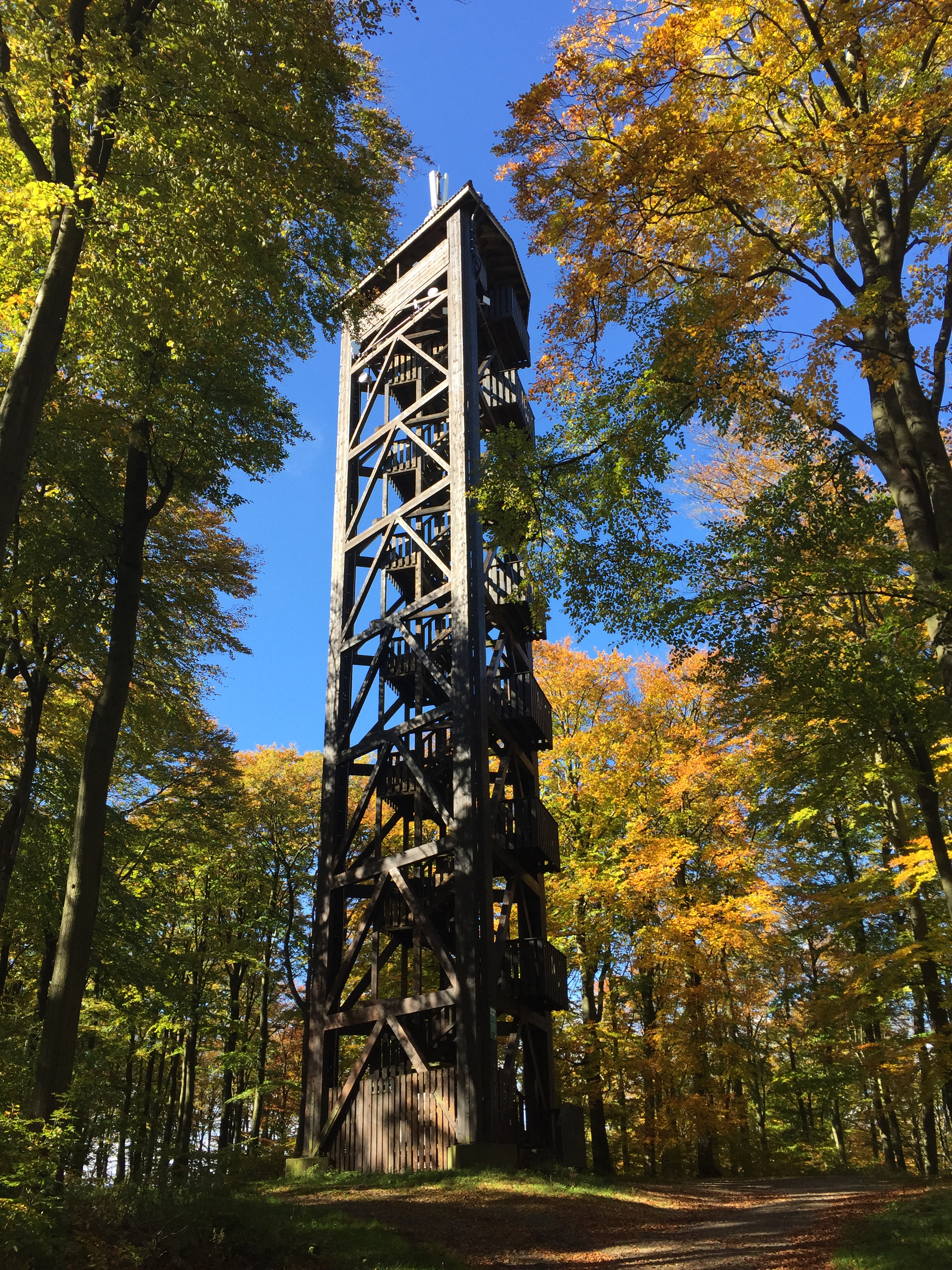
- The look-out tower at the summit

Highest point
- Elevation: 662.6 m (2,174 ft)

Geography
- Location: Hesse, Germany

Pferdskopf is a 662.6 meter (2,174 feet) high mountain of Hesse, Germany.

At the summit of the mountain stands an observation tower. From 1895 to 1960 it was an 18 meter high tower made from steel and built by the Taunusklub, a regional rambling club. The current tower is 34 meter high and made from wood in the year 1987.
