= Rhenish Massif =

Mountain range in Europe

Coordinates: 51°00′N 7°50′E

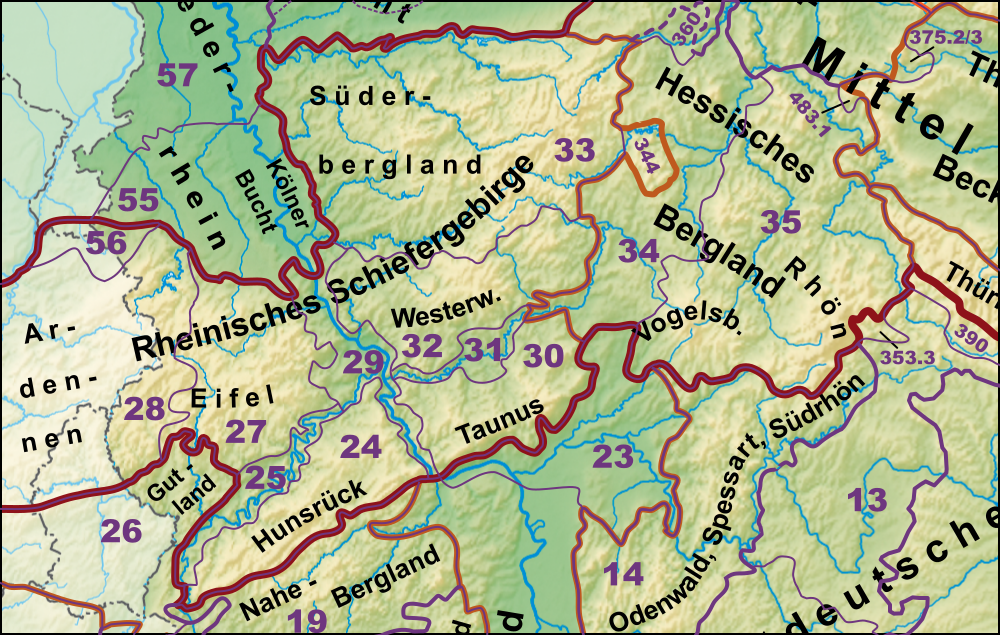

Highest point
- Peak: Großer Feldberg
- Elevation: 2,881 ft (878 m)

Geography
- Country: Germany, Belgium, Luxembourg, Netherlands and France
- States: North Rhine-Westphalia, Rhineland-Palatinate and Hesse
- Parent range: Central Uplands

Geology
- Orogeny: Variscan (Hercynian)
- Rock ages: Devonian and Carboniferous
- Rock type: metamorphic rock

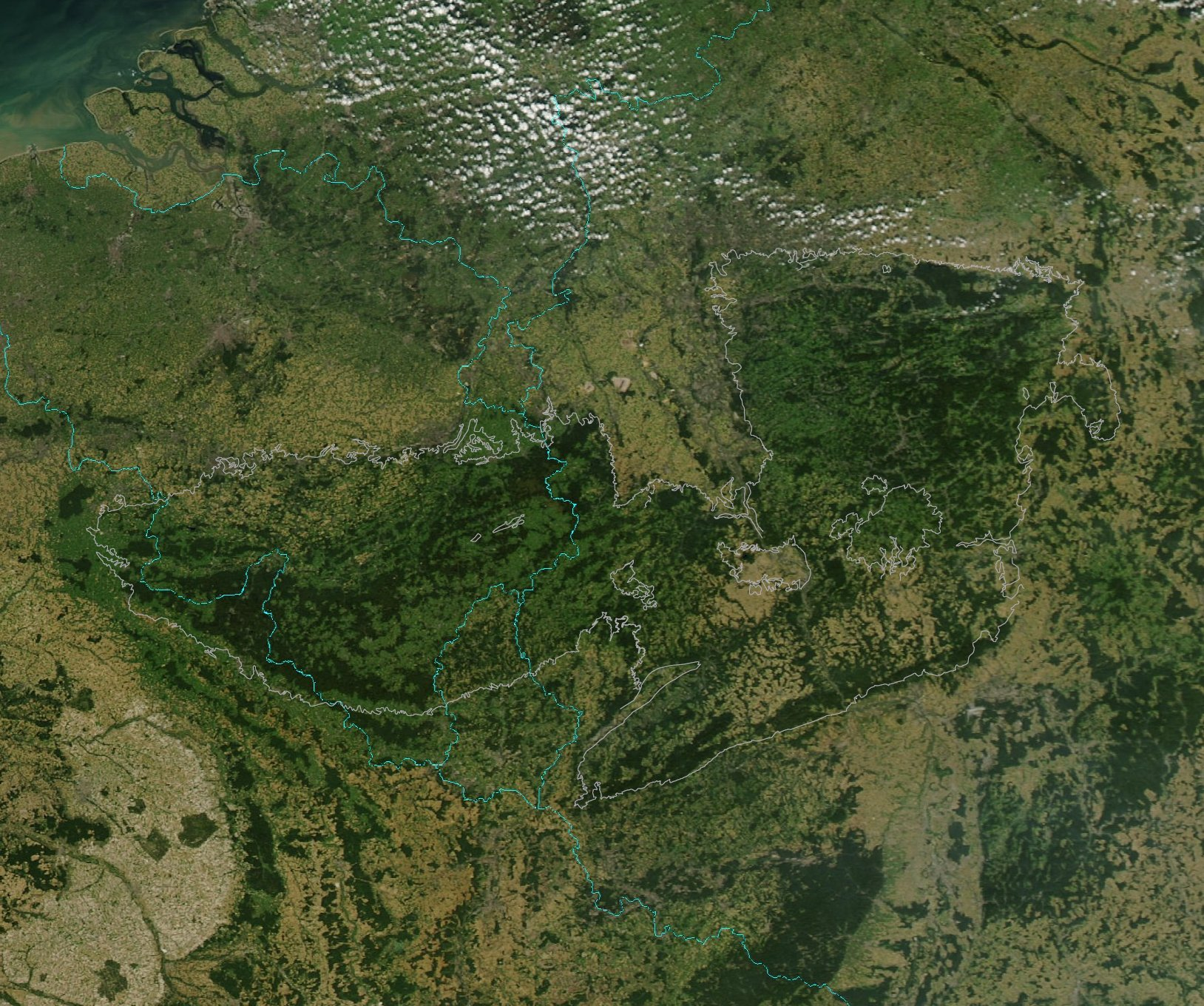
Satellite image with outlines (grey-drawn outline) of the Rhenish Slate Mountains (green trees). Above left the mouth of the Rhine into the North Sea.

The Rhenish Massif, Rhine Massif or Rhenish Uplands (German: Rheinisches Schiefergebirge [ˈʁaɪnɪʃəs ˈʃiːfɐɡəˌbɪʁɡə]: 'Rhenish Slate Uplands'; French: massif schisteux rhénan [masif ʃistø ʁenɑ̃]: 'Rhenish Schistose Massif') is a geologic massif in western Germany, southeastern Netherlands, eastern Belgium, Luxembourg and northeastern France. It is drained centrally, south to north by the river Rhine and a few of its tributaries.

West of the indent of the Cologne Bight it has the Eifel and the Belgian and French Ardennes; east is its greatest German component, the Süder Uplands. The Hunsrück hills form its southwest. The Westerwald is an eastern strip. The Lahn-Dill area is a small central zone and the Taunus Mountains form the rest, the south-east.

The massif hosts the Middle Rhine Valley (Rhine Gorge), a UNESCO World Heritage site linked to the lowest parts of the Moselle (German: Mosel, Luxembourgish: Musel).

== Geology ==
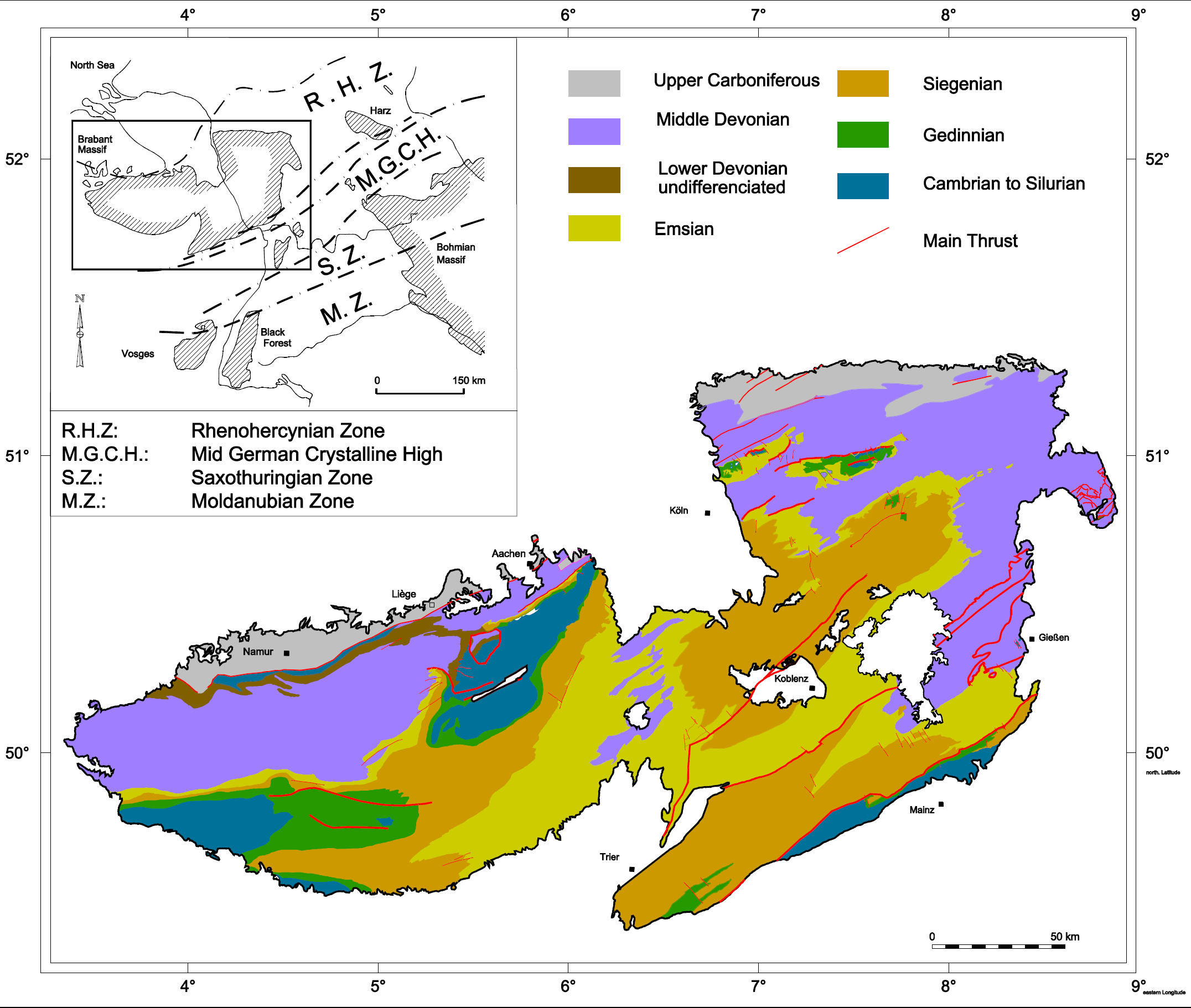
Geological sketch of the Rhenish Massif

Geologically the Rhenish Massif consists of metamorphic rocks, mostly slates (hence its German name), deformed and metamorphosed during the Hercynian orogeny (around 300 million years ago). Most of the massif is part of the Rhenohercynian zone of this orogeny, that also encompasses the Harz further east and Devonian rocks of Cornwall (southwestern England).

Most rocks in the Rhenish Massif were originally sediments, mostly deposited during the Devonian and Carboniferous in a back-arc basin called the Rhenohercynian basin. In some places in the Ardennes, even older rocks of Cambrian to Silurian age crop out as massifs overlain by Devonian slates. These older rocks form smaller massifs of their own (Stavelot, Rocroi, Givonne and Serpont). In the eastern Rhenish Massif some very limited outcrops in the Sauerland show rocks of Ordovician and lower Siliurian age. Further Ordovician rock exposures are part of the southern Taunus.

The second rock type are Tertiary and Quaternary igneous rocks, which most prominently occur in the Vulkaneifel, the Westerwald and the Vogelsberg. The volcanic rocks have been linked to a mantle plume that, due to its low density and buoyancy, uplifted the entire region during the last few hundred thousand years, as measured from the present elevation of old river terraces.

== Mountain and hill ranges ==
The mountain and hill ranges within the Rhenish Massif - some with maximum height in metres above sea level (NN)) are given below:

West of the Rhine from north(west) to south(east)

- Ardennes (694 m)
- Eifel (747 m; 27-28), subdivisions include:
  - High Eifel
  - Vulkan Eifel
  - Ahr Hills
  - Zitter Forest
  - Fore-Eifel
  - Moselle Eifel
  - South Eifel
  - West Eifel
    - Islek
    - Schnee Eifel
    - Schneifel
    - Belgian Eifel
  - Rur Eifel
  - High Fens
- Hunsrück (816 m; 24), subdivisions include:
  - Bingen Forest
  - Idar Forest
  - Lützelsoon
  - Osburger Hochwald
  - Schwarzwälder Hochwald
  - Soonwald

East of the Rhine from north(west) to south(east)

- Süder Uplands (843.2 m; 33)
  - Ardey Hills (274 m)
  - Iserlohn Heights (546 m)
  - Plackwald (581.5 m, Arnsberg Forest Nature Park)
  - Bergish Plateaux
  - Ebbe Mountains (663.3 m)
  - Lenne Mountains (656.1 m)
  - Saalhausen Hills (687.7 m)
  - Siegerland
  - Rothaar Mountains (incl Hochsauerland, 843.2 m)
  - Kellerwald (675 m, eastern outliers in the West Hesse Highlands; 344)
- Westerwald (657 m: 32)
  - Siebengebirge (460 m, zum Middle Rhine region; 292.4)
  - Montabaur Heights (545 m)
  - Gladenbach Uplands (609 m)
- Taunus (881,5 m; 30), subdivisions include:
  - Anterior Taunus
  - High Taunus
  - Hintertaunus
    - Western Hintertaunus
    - Idstein Basin
    - Eastern Hintertaunus

== Literature ==
- d´Hein: Nationaler Geopark Vulkanland Eifel. Ein Natur- und Kulturführer. Gaasterland Verlag Düsseldorf 2006, ISBN 3-935873-15-8.
- Fliegel, D.: Ein geologisches Profil durch das Rheinische Schiefergebirge. Cöln, 1909. Online-Ausgabe dilibri Rheinland-Pfalz.
- von Winterfeld, Claus; Bayer, Ulf; Oncken, Onno; Lünenschloß, Brita; Springer, Jörn (1994): Das westliche Rheinische Schiefergebirge. Geowissenschaften; 12; 320-324, doi:10.2312/GEOWISSENSCHAFTEN.1994.12.320.
- Meyer, W.: Geologie der Eifel, Schweizerbart'sche Verlagsbuchhandlung, Stuttgart, 1986. ISBN 3-510-65127-8.
- Schmidt, E. et al.: Deutschland. Harms Handbuch der Geographie. Paul List Verlag KG, 26th edn., Munich, 1975. ISBN 3-471-18803-7.
- Thews, J.-D.: Erläuterungen zur Geologischen Übersichtskarte von Hessen 1:300.000, Geol. Abhandlungen Hessen Bd. 96, Hess. L.-A. für Bodenforschung, Wiesbaden, 1996. ISBN 3-89531-800-0.
- Vogel, Andreas, Hubert Miller and Reinhard Greiling, The Rhenish Massif: Structure, Evolution, Mineral Deposits and Present Geodynamics. Wiesbaden: Springer, 1987. ISBN 978-3-663-01888-9.
- Walter, R. et al.: Geologie von Mitteleuropa. 5th edition, Schweizerbarth’sche Verlagsbuchhandlung, Stuttgart, 1992. ISBN 3-510-65149-9 (German).
