= Weilsberg =

Mountain in Hesse, Germany

Coordinates: 50°13′52″N 8°25′46″E

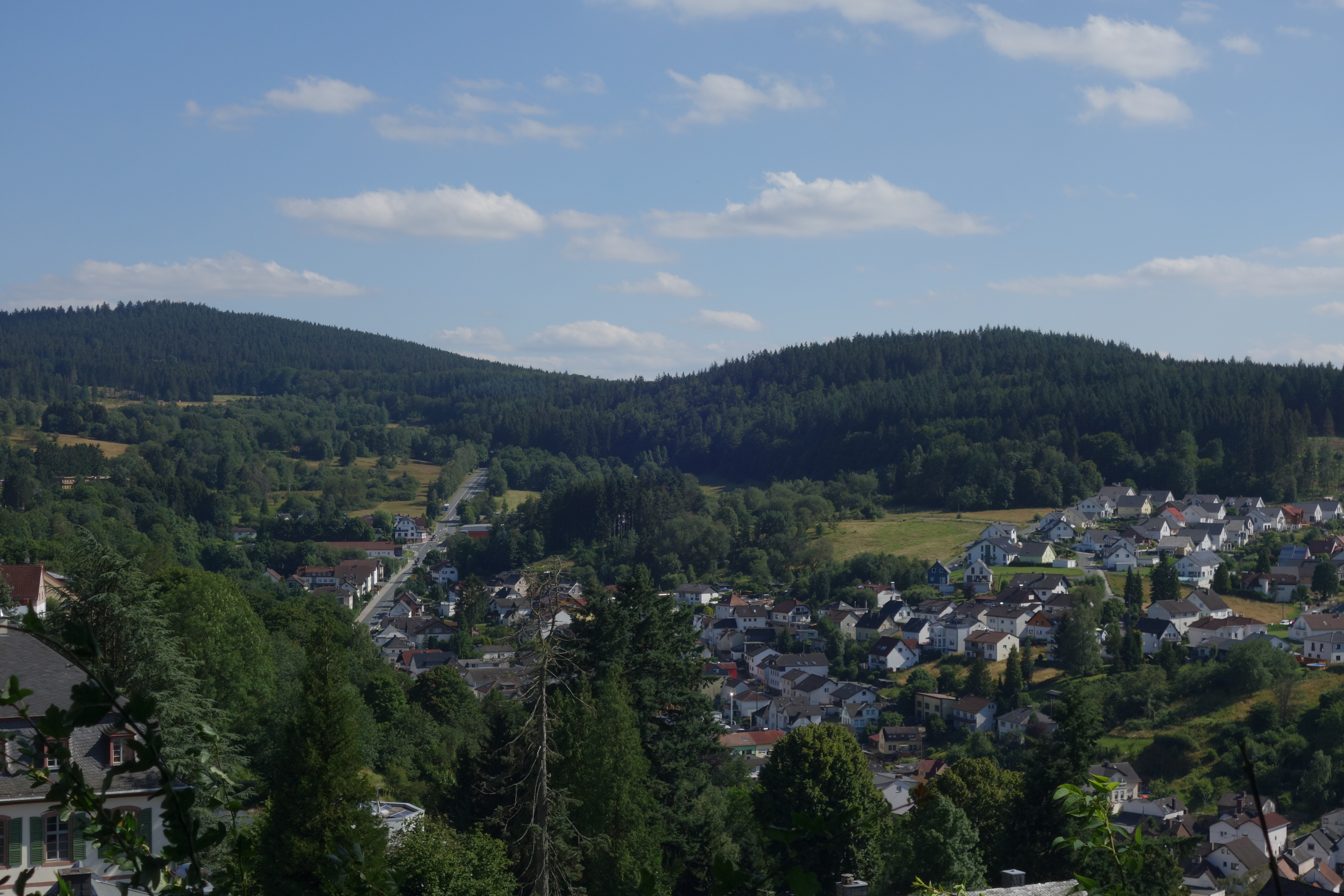
- Weilsberg (right), as seen from Reifenberg castle (Kleiner Feldberg mountain on the left)

Highest point
- Elevation: 7,007 m (22,989 ft)

Geography
- Location: Hesse, Germany

Weilsberg is a mountain of Hesse, Germany. it is the fourth highest mountain of the Taunus and the highest one of the Eastern Hintertaunus.
