= Taunus =

Mountain range in Germany

- die Höhe, 'the height'
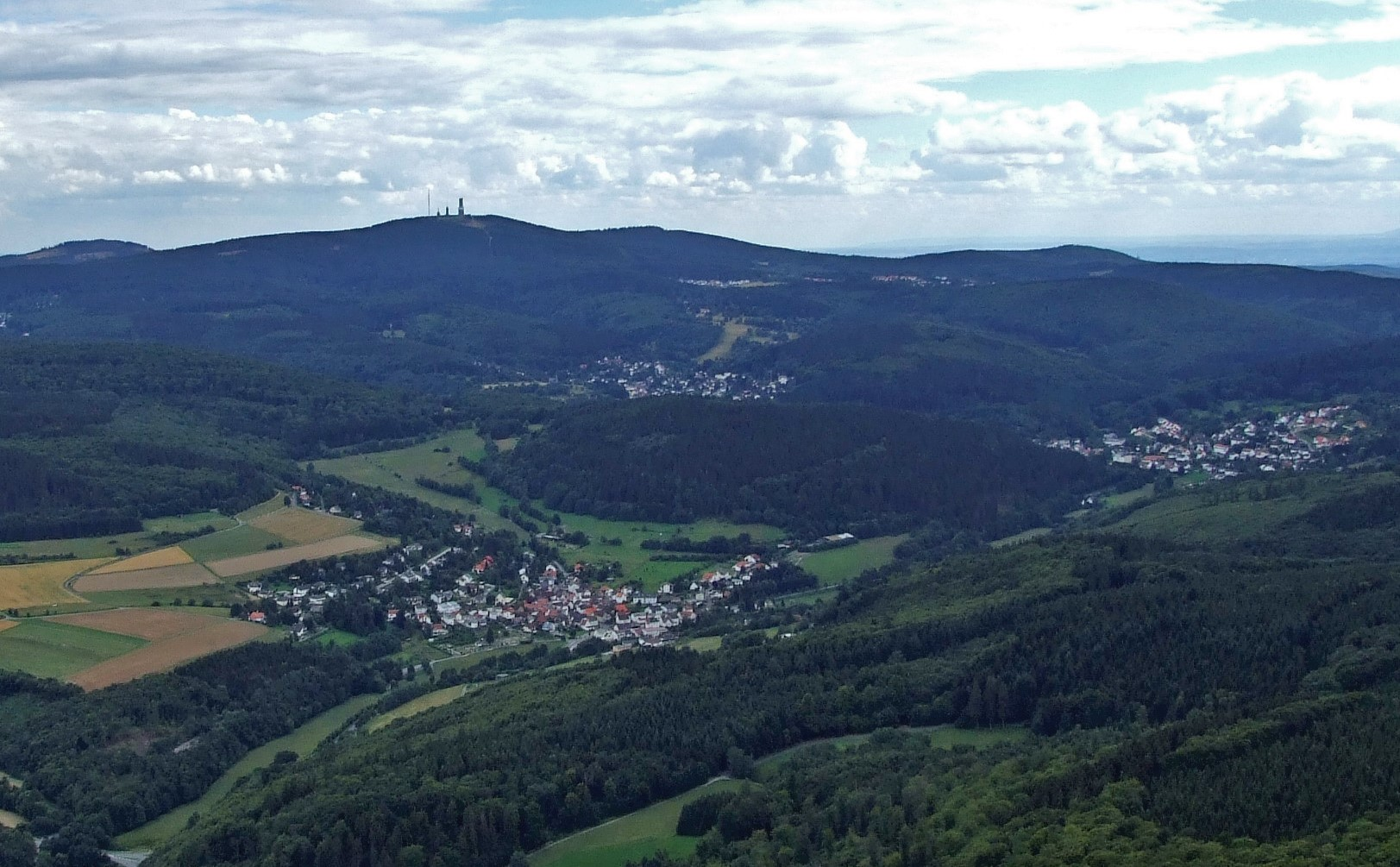
- Hochtaunus with Großer Feldberg as its highest point

Highest point
- Peak: Großer Feldberg (Hochtaunus)
- Elevation: 878 m (2,881 ft)
- Coordinates: 50°14′N 08°27′E

Dimensions
- Length: 75 km (47 mi) NE/SW
- Width: 35 km (22 mi) NW/SE
- Area: 2,700 km^{2} (1,000 mi^{2})

Geography
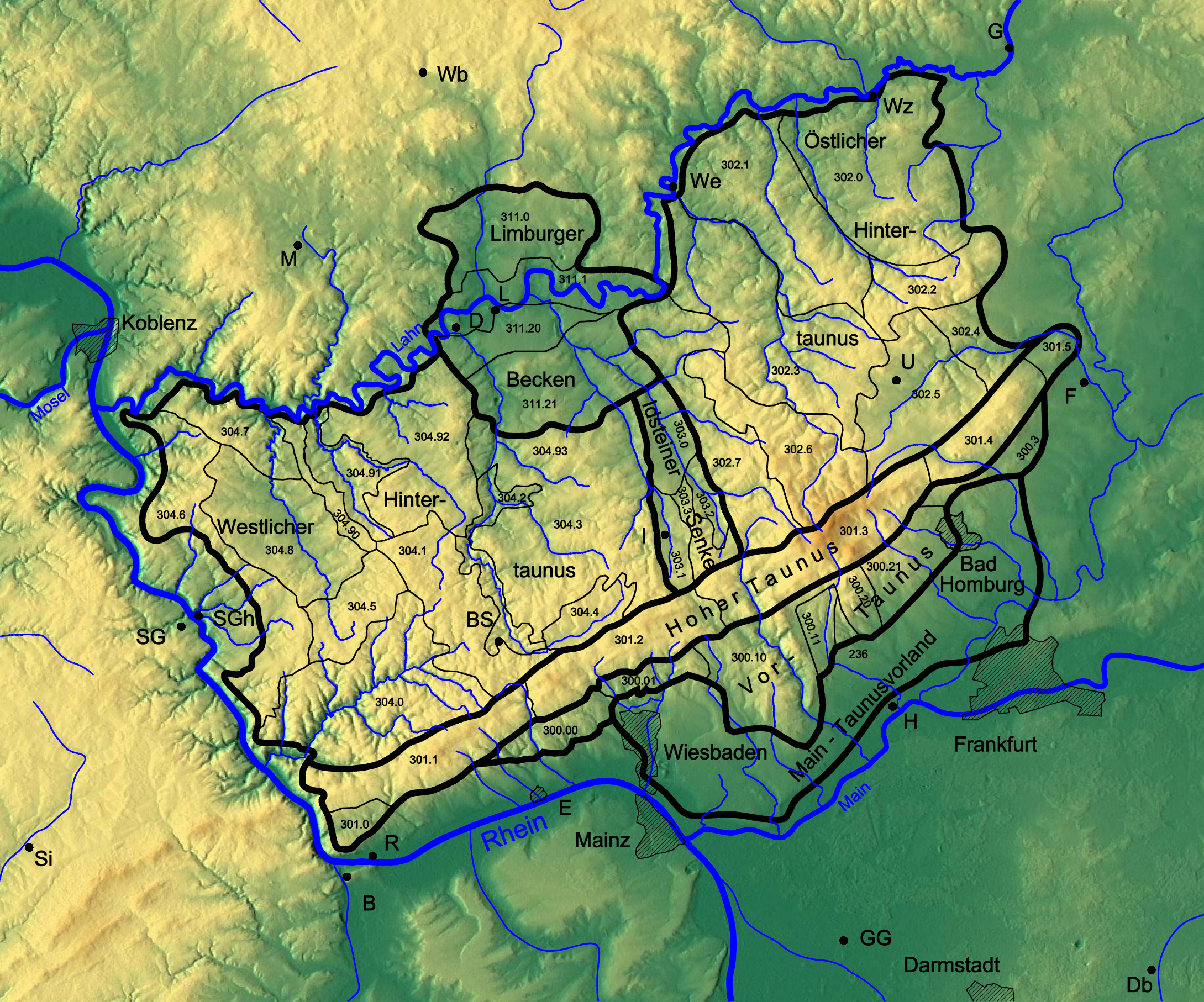
- Geographical subdivision of the Taunus with shaded relief
- Country: Germany
- Region(s): Hesse & Rhineland-Palatinate
- Parent range: Rhenish Slate Mountains

Geology
- Orogeny: Variscan
- Rock age: Devonian
- Rock type(s): Phyllite, Greywacke

The Taunus (German pronunciation: [ˈtaʊnʊs]) is a mountain range in Hesse and Rhineland-Palatinate, Germany, located north west of Frankfurt and north of Wiesbaden. The tallest peak in the range is Großer Feldberg at 878 m; other notable peaks are Kleiner Feldberg (825 m) and Altkönig (798 m).

The range is bounded on three sides (west, north, and south) by the Rhine and its tributaries, namely the Lahn and the Main, and on the east by the plain of Wetterau. It spans the districts of Hochtaunuskreis, Main-Taunus-Kreis, Rheingau-Taunus, Limburg-Weilburg, and Rhein-Lahn. The range is known for its geothermal springs and mineral waters that formerly attracted members of the European aristocracy to its spa towns. The car line Ford Taunus is named after it.

== Location and boundary ==
The Taunus is the southeastern part of the Rhenish Slate Mountains. The low mountain range is about 75 km long from southwest to northeast and about 35 km wide across it from northwest to southeast, it covers an area of about 2700 km^{2}. In the west, the Upper Middle Rhine Valley borders the Taunus and separates it from the western Hunsrück. In the north, the valley of the Lahn (Giessen-Koblenzer Lahntal) with the Limburg Basin forms a very sharp scenic border to the northern Westerwald. In the east, the Giessen Basin (southernmost part of the West Hessian Uplands) with Dießenbach and Kleebach border to the north, the Wetterau with Wetter and Nidda to the south of the slate mountains; in the south, the Rheingau and the Main-Taunus foothills form natural borders. The last three landscapes are part of the Rhine-Main lowlands.

On the southern edge are the towns of Rüdesheim am Rhein, Wiesbaden, Hofheim am Taunus and Bad Homburg vor der Höhe at the junctions with the valleys of the Upper Rhine and Main; the towns of Bad Nauheim and Butzbach are on the eastern edge at the junction with the Wetterau; in the north on the Lahn the towns of Wetzlar, Weilburg, Bad Ems and Lahnstein border on the Hintertaunus; in the west in the Middle Rhine is, among other things, Lorch at the seam (each in an anti-clockwise direction).

== Natural structure ==
The Taunus is a heterogeneous landscape area, but it is usually quite distinct from the surrounding landscapes and is classified as a main natural area unit group. The natural landscape is divided according to morphology, geological structure, climate and partly by the prevailing vegetation into sub-landscapes that are more uniform in themselves. The cultural landscape, i.e. the natural landscape shaped by man, shows the following structure in terms of land use, the location and distribution of settlements and the course of traffic routes.

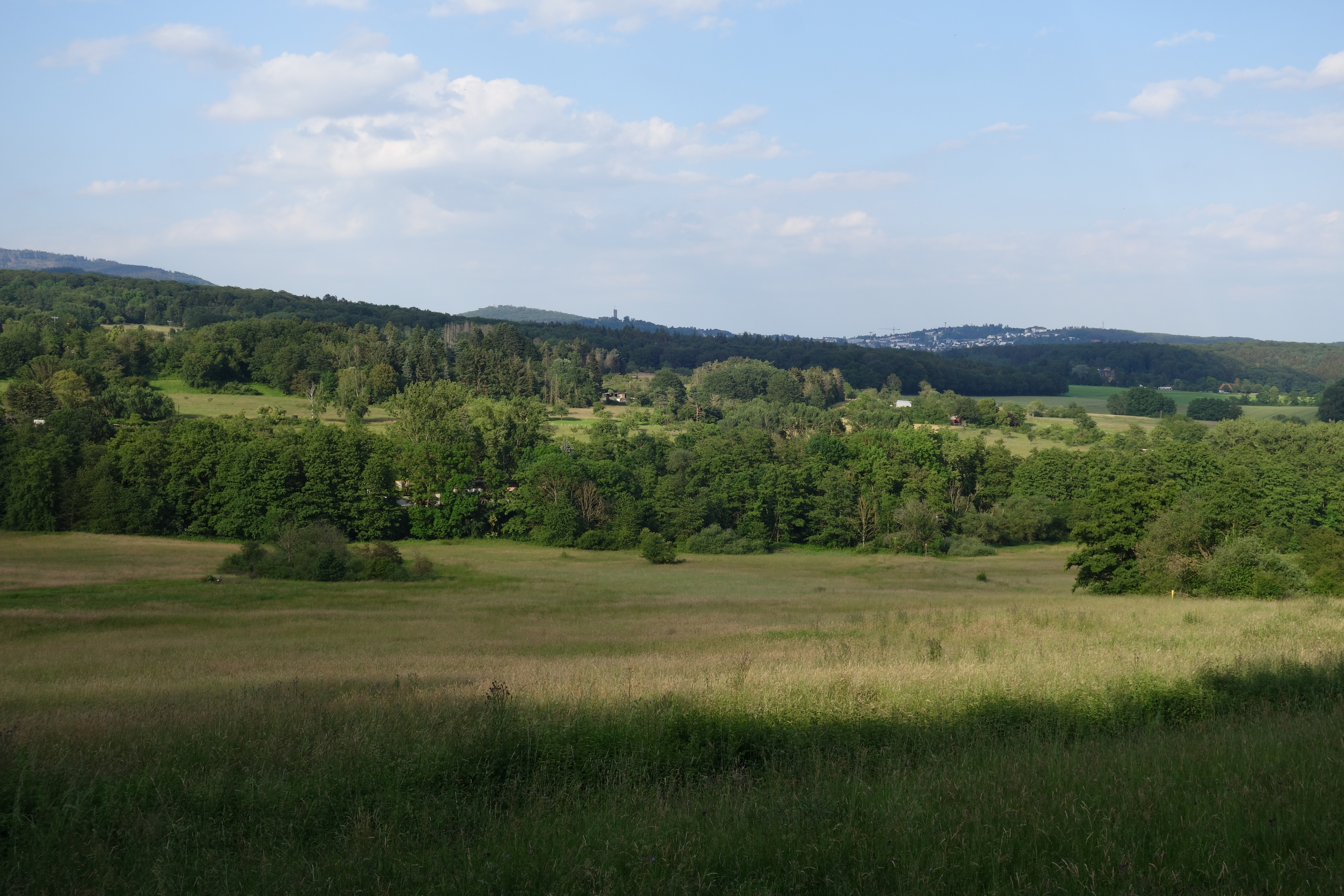
Naturschutzgebiet (nature reserve) Krebsbachtal bei Ruppertshain (Kelkheim, Anterior Taunus)

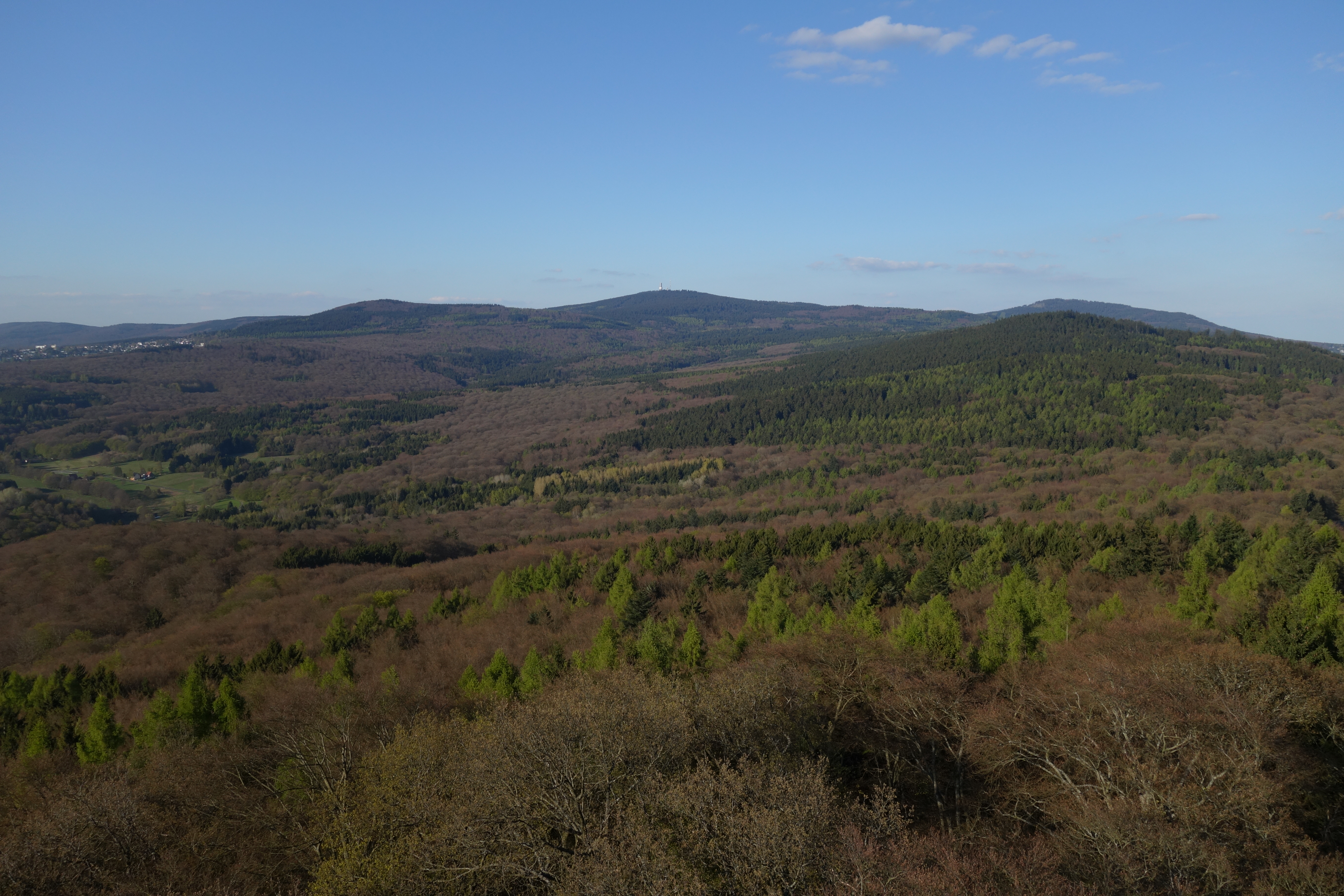
View from Atzelberg Tower along the widely wooded main ridge of the Taunus

In the south are the more wooded and higher parts, namely the Vordertaunus (naturally also called Vortaunus) and the Hohe Taunus (around Taunus main ridge), where in the Feldberg massif the highest heights not only of the Taunus but of the entire Rhenish Slate Mountains are reached. That is why the climate here is rougher than in the upstream landscape areas - it is colder on average, it rains and, in particular, it snows more. The turbulent relief offers little space for settlements and agricultural use. On the mostly shallow and fertile soils, which developed from acidic rock, there is mainly forest here. The Vortaunus is more inconsistent than the main ridge, it is morphologically more fragmented and the bays of the foothills divide it more.

Hintertaunus is the name given to the area north of the Hoher Taunus up to the Lahn valley. The landscape here is lower and less mountainous than in the southern Taunus. Between the valleys, some of which are quite deep, there are pronounced plateaus (leveled areas) with heavy agricultural use. Since mostly only the slopes of the valley are forested, the Hintertaunus is generally more open. The landscape of the Hintertaunus is more inconsistent because of its different elevations. This is clearly evident in the eastern Hintertaunus. Here, for example, there is a high-altitude landscape with dense forest cover, a harsher climate and poor soil in the Pferdskopf-Taunus; but also the Usingen basin, a gently undulating, open basin landscape with fertile soil and a balanced climate.

The Hintertaunus is divided into Western and Eastern Hintertaunus by the Idstein Depression, which developed in the Idstein–Bad Camberg area. The Idstein depression widens towards the Lahn valley towards the Limburg Basin and is also known as Goldener Grund (Golden ground) in the northern area, probably because agriculture found more favorable conditions here. The relief is gently undulating, the soil is fertile due to the high proportion of loess and the climate is milder due to the basin location.

The Taunus (main unit group 30) is subdivided in terms of natural space as follows:

- 300 Vortaunus (218.90 km^{2})
  - 300.0 Rheingau-Wiesbadener Vortaunus (47.04 km^{2})
    - 300.00 Rheingau-Vortaunus (28.00 km^{2})
    - 300.01 Wiesbaden Vortaunus (19.04 km^{2})
  - 300.1 Eppstein-Hornauer Vortaunus (101.66 km^{2})
    - 300.10 Eppsteiner Horst (82.98 km^{2})
    - 300.11 Hornau Bay (18.68 km^{2})
  - 300.2 Altkönig vorstufe (48.49 km^{2})
      - 300.20 Königstein foot of the Taunus (18.29 km^{2})
      - 300.21 Kronberg Taunus foot (30.20 km^{2})
  - 300.3 Homburg Vortaunus (21.71 km^{2})
- 301 High Taunus (314.92 km^{2})
    - 301.0 Niederwald bei Rüdesheim(12.87 km^{2})
    - 301.1 Rheingau Mountains (76.47 km^{2})
    - 301.2 Wiesbaden High Taunus (71.43 km^{2})
    - 301.3 Feldberg-Taunus crest (96.95 km^{2})
    - 301.4 Winterstein-Taunuskamm (45.80 km^{2})
    - 301.5 Nauheimer Taunusspur (11.40 km^{2})
- 302 Eastern Hintertaunus (825.66 km^{2})
  - 302.0 Wetzlar Hintertaunus (165.88 km^{2})
    - 302.1 Weilburger Hintertaunus (with Edelsberger Platte) (131.80 km^{2})
    - 302.2 Bodenroder Kuppen (52.70 km^{2})
    - 302.3 Hasselbacher Hintertaunus (169.83 km^{2})
    - 302.4 Münster-Maibach threshold (26.30 km^{2})
    - 302.5 Using Basin (87.50 km^{2})
    - 302.6 Pferdskopf-Taunus (81.47 km^{2})
    - 302.7 Steinfischbacher Hintertaunus (110.18 km^{2})
- 303 Idstein Valley (82.63 km^{2})
  - 303.0 Golden Grund (31.74 km^{2})
    - 303.1 Idsteiner Grund (24.39 km^{2})
    - 303.2 Escher Grund (10.19 km^{2})
    - 303.3 Idstein Forest (16.31 km^{2})
- 304 Western Hintertaunus (908.38 km^{2})
  - 304.0 Wispertaunus (145.05 km^{2})
    - 304.1 Western Aartaunus (82.66 km^{2})
    - 304.2 Bad Schwalbach-Hohensteiner Aartal (22.32 km^{2})
      - 304.20 Aar-Aubach-Grund (0.27 km^{2})
    - 304.3 Eastern Aartaunus (184.56 km^{2})
    - 304.4 Oberaarmulde (23.83 km^{2})
    - 304.5 Zorn plateau (41.64 km^{2})
    - 304.6 Middle Rhine Taunus (109.56 km^{2})
    - 304.7 Unterlahn Heights (38.19 km^{2})
    - 304.8 Nastätter Mulde (92.58 km^{2})
    - 304.9 Katzenelnbogen plateau (167.99 km^{2})
      - 304.90 Dörsbach/Mühlbach watershed (16.24 km^{2})
      - 304.91 Lower Dörsbach-Tiefenbach area (34.42 km^{2})
      - 304.92 Central Katzenelnbogen plateau (104.43 km^{2})
      - 304.93 Schiesheim Aartal widening (12.90 km^{2})

== Geology and minerals ==
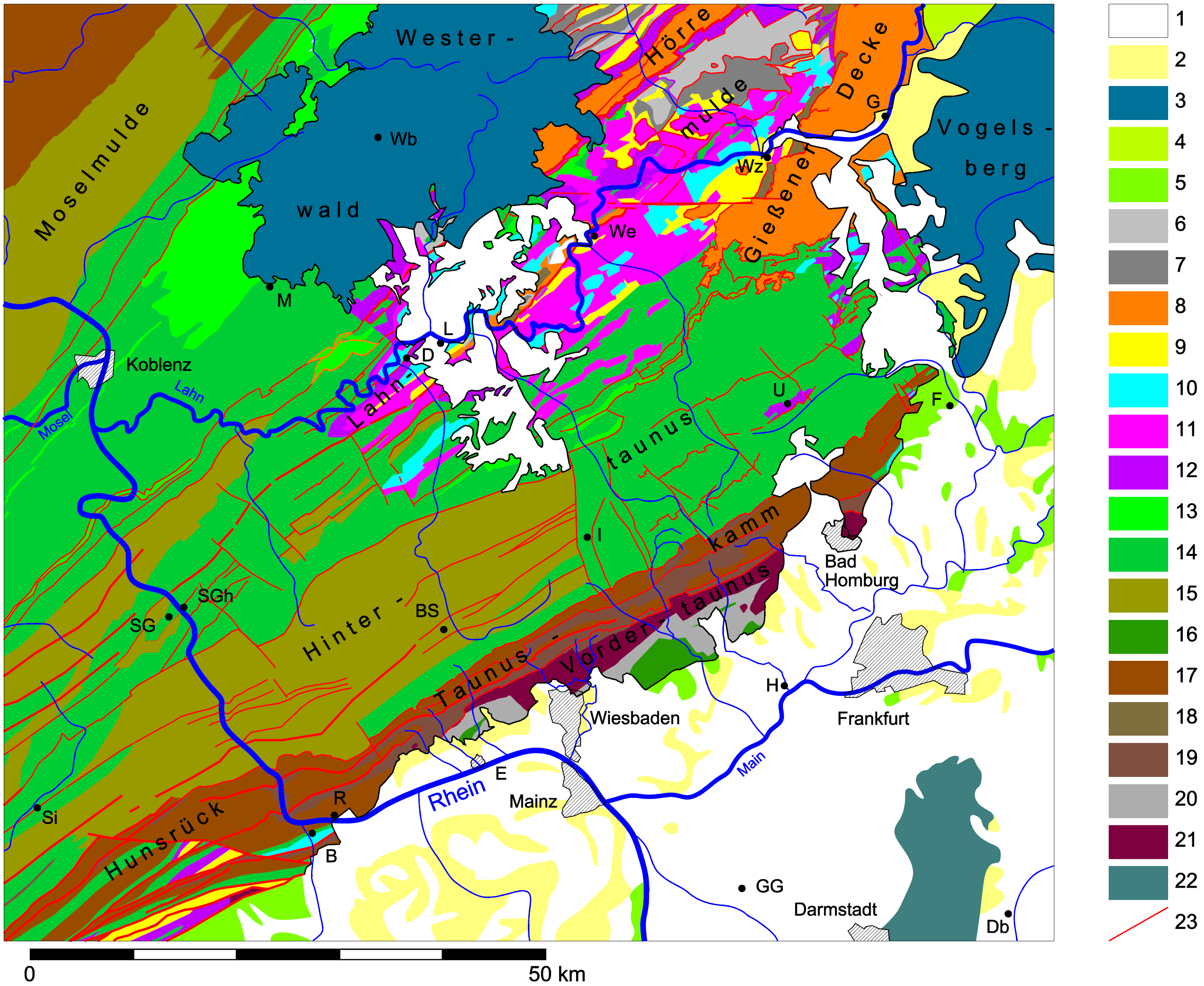
Geological map of the Taunus

The Taunus is geologically divided from south to north into the units Vordertaunus unit (also northern phyllite zone or metamorphic southern edge zone), Taunus ridge unit and Hintertaunus unit. Finally, south of the Lahn, the Taunus natural region has a share in the Lahn trough and the Giessen nappe.

=== Vordertaunus ===
The Vordertaunus Unit is a narrow zone of weakly metamorphic rocks such as phyllites, greenschists and sericite gneisses. They are appear greenish through chlorite and epidote. The starting products of these rocks were mudstones and volcanic rocks. The rock strata occurring in the Vordertaunus are divided from north to south into the metavolcanic sequence, the Eppstein slate and the Lorsbach slate.

The oldest sedimentary rocks of the Taunus are the phyllites of Bierstadt from the Early Ordovician epoch, known only from a borehole in Wiesbaden, with an age of about 480 million years determined by the evidence of spores. The volcanic rocks of the metavulcanite unit are younger, they could be dated to the Upper Ordovician and Silurian using uranium-lead dating. They are overlaid by the Eppstein slates of the Silurian and the Lower Devonian Lorsbach slates. At the very southern edge and in a small deposit near Mühlbach in the east of the Vordertaunus unit, limestones are exposed that are attributed to the Middle Devonian.

=== Taunus crest ===
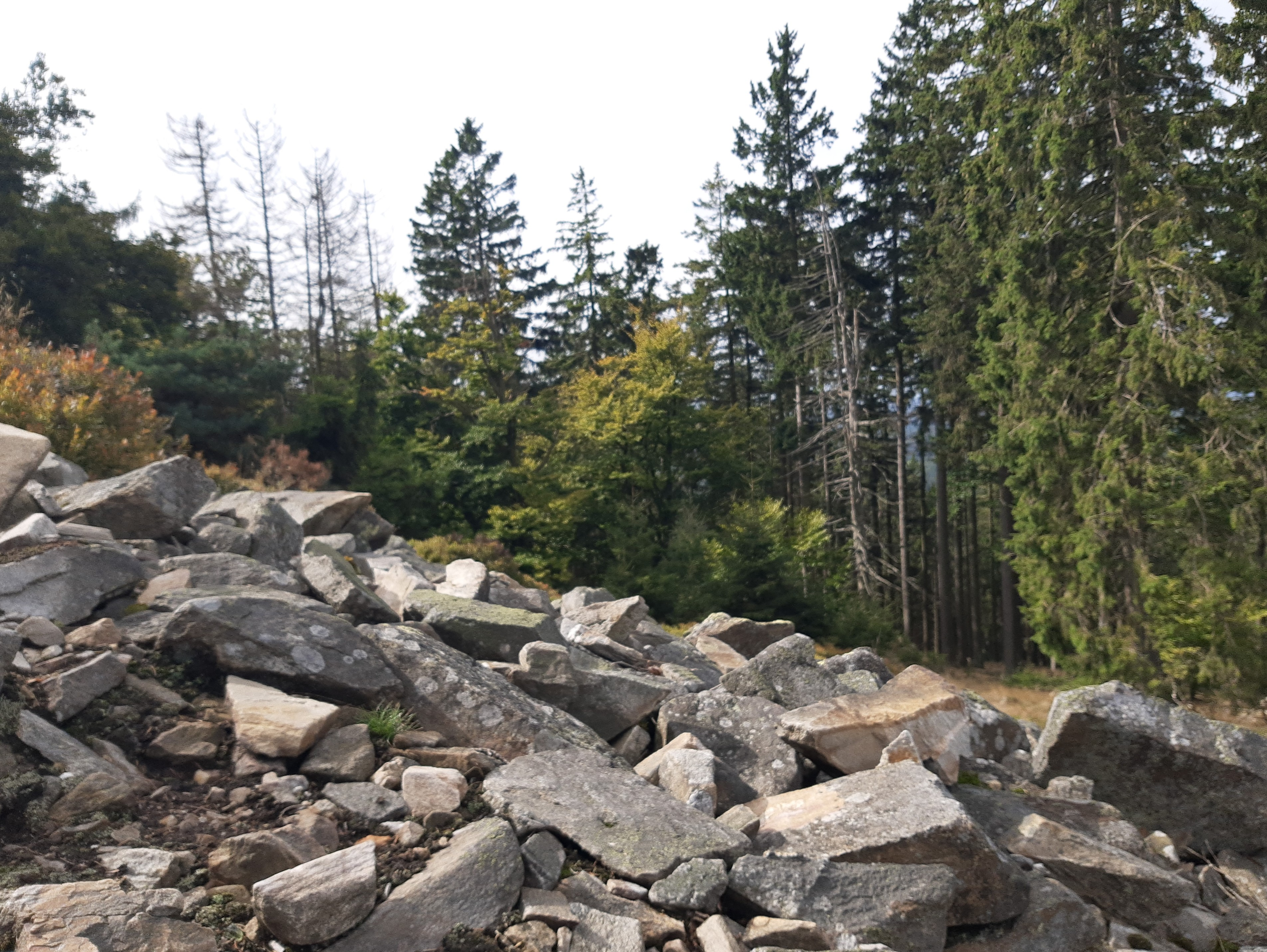
Celtic rock rings on the ascent to Altkönig

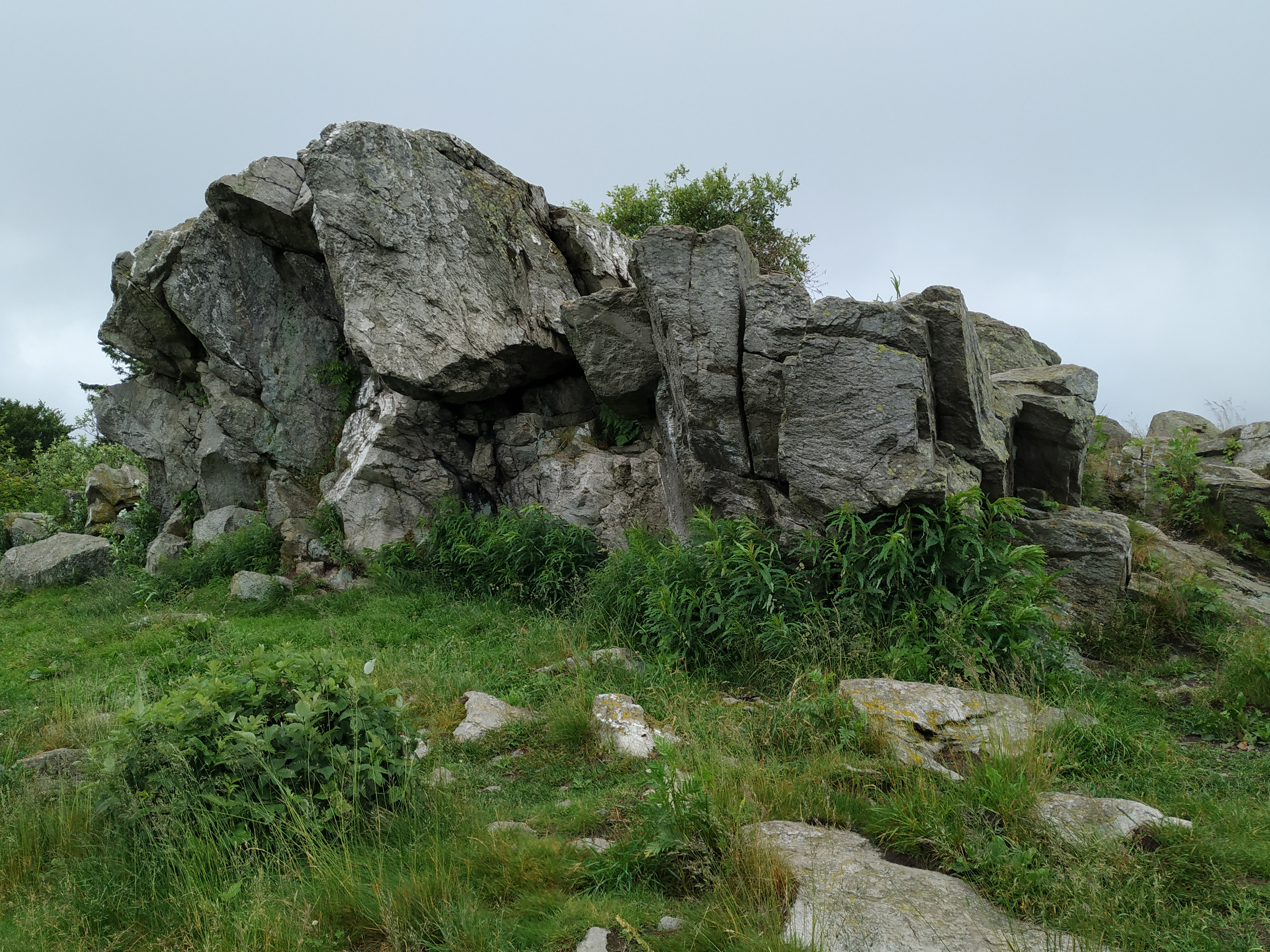
Brunhildis rock at the summit of the Großer Feldberg

To the north of the Vordertaunus is the Taunuscrest, also known as the High Taunus, which mainly consists of Lower Devonian clastic rocks. It is composed of the stratigraphic sequences Graue Phyllite, Bunte Schiefer, Hermeskeilschichten and Taunusquarzit. The Lower Devonian sub-layer only appears in two small outcrops, metavolcanites of the type found in the Anterior Taunus rocks.

The Graue Phyllite consist of slates and sandstones. They contain impressions of Upper Silurian brachiopods and corals and were deposited in shallow water. The clay slates of the Bunte Schiefer are greenish-grey or strikingly violet in color due to finely distributed hematite. Agnaths (jawless fish) found in the Bunte Schist are from the Gedinne (Lochkovian); just like the formation of the rock, they show a deposit of the colorful slate in rivers or lakes. The rocks of the colorful slate are found on the Großer Feldberg, where they were mined in tunnels to extract roofing slate (slate tunnel below the Red Cross). Quartzite sandstones are embedded in them, from which the Brunhildis rock on the summit of the Großer Feldberg consists. The Hermeskeil layers are exposed below the Großer Feldberg and consist of mudstones, weakly consolidated micaceous sandstones and quartzites of the Lower Siegen (Lower Pragian). They are covered by several 100 m thick layers of Taunus quartzite (Middle Siegen, Pragian/Emsian). The very weather-resistant rock forms many summits of the Taunus ridge (Altkönig, Kleiner Feldberg, Glaskopf), but also individual rock elevations (such as the Hohle Stein). The Celtic ring walls and the rubble heap on the "White Wall" on the Altkönig consist of Taunus quartzite. The fractured groundwater of the Taunus quartzite is of local interest for water extraction. They are dammed by the underlying Hermeskeilschichten and pumped through groundwater tunnels. Four such groundwater tunnels make a significant contribution to Wiesbaden's water supply.

=== Hintertaunus ===
The largest unit of the Taunus in terms of area, the Hintertaunus unit, is mainly composed of the black rock series of the Hunsrück slate and the Singhofen layers of the lower Ems tier, often greywacke-like sandstones as well as siltstone and claystone. Younger rocks are only exposed here in small occurrences near Usingen and on the very eastern edge of the Hintertaunus in the Oberkleen area. The geology of the Hintertaunus is not as well known as that of the Vortaunus and Hochtaunus in the south or that of the Lahnmulde in the north due to the often monotonous sandy and slate rocks that form only a few continuous reference horizons and provide hardly any index fossils.

The Hunsrück slate refers to a rock facies occurring mainly in the Hunsrück and Hintertaunus, which is composed of pure, mostly black mudstone and embedded sandstone banks and occurs in stratigraphically different positions in the Upper Siegen and in the Ems. The bulk of the Hunsrück Slate is attributed to the Elm Lower Stage. It is known for its exceptionally well-preserved fossils and is locally well suited for use as roofing slate. In the western Hintertaunus, the almost sand-free Hunsrück slate can be easily separated from the sandy rocks of the Singhofen layers, in the east, rocks in the facies of the Hunsrück slate recede. Transposed volcanic tuffes and ashes, the so-called porphyroides, are integrated into the Singhofen layers, they can be traced in some cases over several tens of kilometers.

The Middle Devonian to Lower Carboniferous of the Usinger Mulde is only about 250 m thick and strongly tectonically disturbed, in the Lahnmulde and Dillmulde typical rocks of this time such as Schalstein, Massenkalk and deck diabase absent here. The greywacke occurring here and at other places in the eastern Hintertaunus cannot or can hardly be distinguished from the Carboniferous Kulm greywacke and are considered by some scientists to be the remains of the viewed Giessen Ceiling.

=== Geological structure ===
The strata of the Taunus were formed in the course of the Variscan orogeny, foliated, scaled and in the southwest–northeast strike saddles and troughs folded. The folds are predominantly northwestvergent. Widespread to the northwest, the rock series were thrust onto younger ones. Thus, at the fault zone of the Taunuskamm overthrust, the entire length of the southern Taunus nappe-like was thrust over rocks of the Younger Lower Devonian. The overthrust of the Giessen Nappe, which lies flat today, on rocks from the Hintertaunus and the Lahn Mulde is of even greater extent. Their rocks are not otherwise found in the Taunus, they must have been deposited south of the Vortaunus and were thrust at least 25 km over the Taunus and Hintertaunus, possibly significantly more due to large-scale considerations. In addition to the deformation of the layers, these are clearly metamorphic in the Vordertaunus – the latter clearly decreases to the north.

In later uplift phases between the Late Jurassic and the Tertiary, cross-fractures were applied perpendicular to strike. The rift valley of the Idstein Depression divides the Hintertaunus into an eastern and western part, while the Limburg Basin divides the Lahn Mulde as it sinks. Some of the fractures are now filled with quartz. The free-standing rocks of the Eschbacher cliffs near Usingen are such a quartz vein (Härtling) exposed by erosion. This vein, also known as the Usinger quartz vein, can be traced over a length of about 12 km, making it one of the longest German quartz veins after the Bavarian Pfahl.

=== Mineral resources ===
The northwestern part of the Eastern Hintertaunus (Langhecker Lahntaunus), which leads to the Weilburger Lahntalgebiet, belongs geologically to the Lahnmulde and is rich in magmatism. of mineral resources from the Middle Devonian such as iron in the form of red ironstone with up to 50 percent iron content, or river ironstone with up to 35% iron, as well as silver ore, roofing slate and diabase. The ore was mined in numerous mines here, as in the Mountain area Lahn-Dill area; some have been converted to visitor mines. The mining that operated from the 17th to the 20th centuries has now ceased. In the eastern Taunus between Idstein in the west and Usingen in the east, from the late Middle Ages to the early 20th century, there was a large number of pits in which there was mining of varying intensity on post-varistic, i.e. only after the varistic orogeny ore veins formed in the late Jurassic and early Cretaceous. The last active lead and silver ore mine, the Heftrich pit with the Hannibal and Hasdrubal tunnels, was closed around 1924. Exploration drilling carried out by the Hessian State Office for Soil Research in the 1980s no longer provided any indication of deposits worth building.

Due to its hardness, the Taunus quartzite was often mined in the past, currently only one quarry near Köppern is in operation. Some limestone and diabase quarries are still in operation in the part of the Lahnmulde that belongs to the Taunus. In addition, there are countless smaller quarries to supply the local population with building blocks.

== History ==
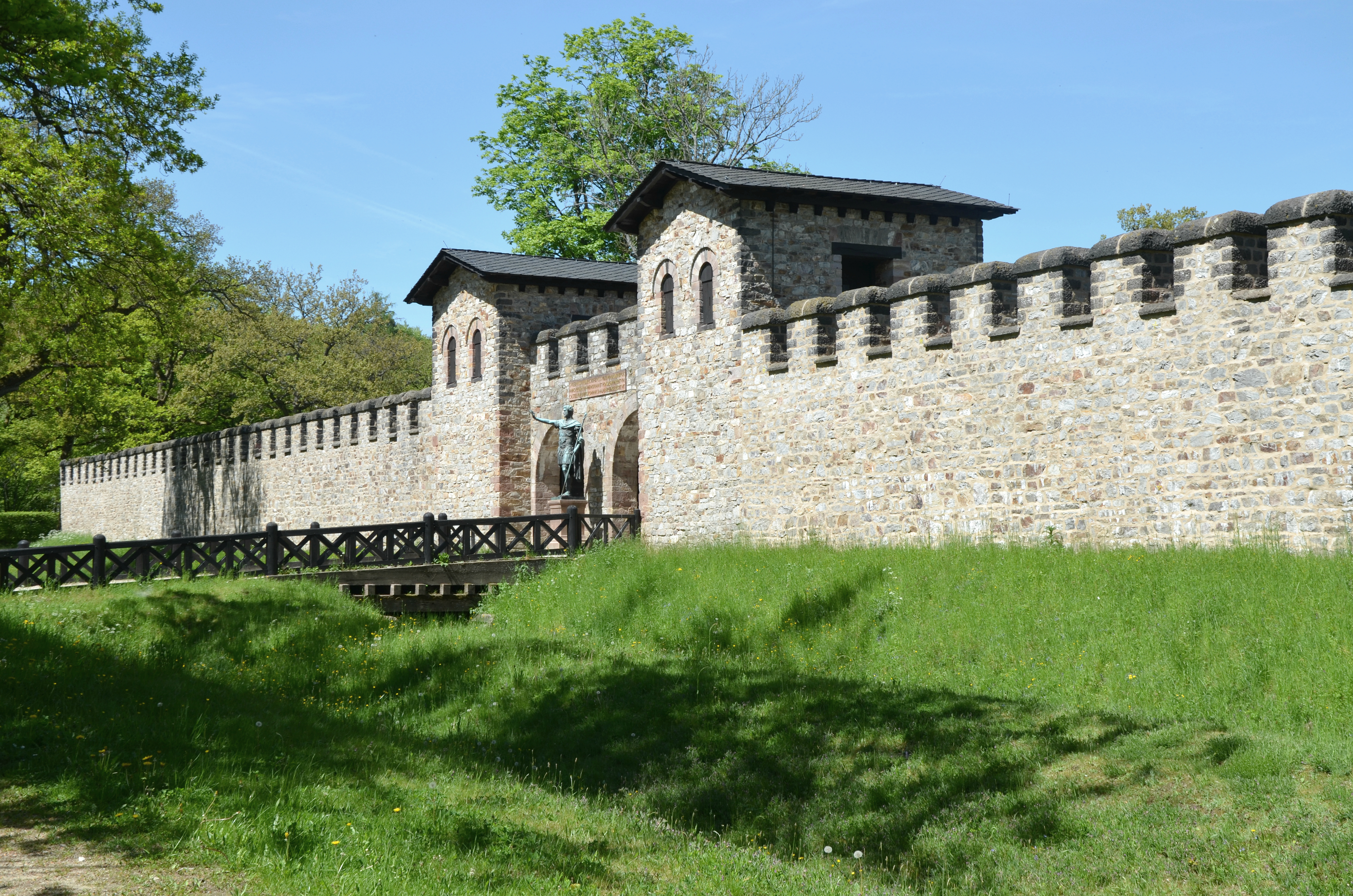
Porta Praetoria (Main Gate) at the Saalburg Roman Fort, Limes Germanicus

The Roman Limes was built across the Taunus. The Saalburg, a restored Roman castellum, now houses a museum.

After the fall of the Limes (in 259/260 AD), the Alamanni settled in the range and for this reason there are some Alemannic cemeteries in the southern foothills of the Taunus (Eschborn). This area of the Taunus became part of the Frankish confederation of Germanic tribes after the Battle of Tolbiac around 500 AD.

Until the late 18th century, the mountain range was known simply as die Höhe ("the height"), a name that has been preserved in the place names Bad Homburg vor der Höhe and Rosbach vor der Höhe. The name Taunus comes from Tacitus's Annals, which mention a castellum in monte Tauno, probably in reference to today's Friedberg.

In past centuries the Taunus became famous among aristocrats for its therapeutic hot springs.

Certain towns in the area, such as Bad Homburg vor der Höhe with its Kurpark, have geothermal spas that were formerly renowned. Other spa towns in the Taunus range are Bad Schwalbach (formerly Langenschwalbach) mentioned in documents dating back to the 16th century, Bad Ems, one of the most reputed therapeutic spas in Germany since the 17th century, as well as Bad Weilbach, where a spring reached wide fame for some time. By the 19th century the most famous spa towns in the area were Wiesbaden, Bad Homburg vor der Höhe, Bad Nauheim, and Bad Soden am Taunus.

== Gallery ==
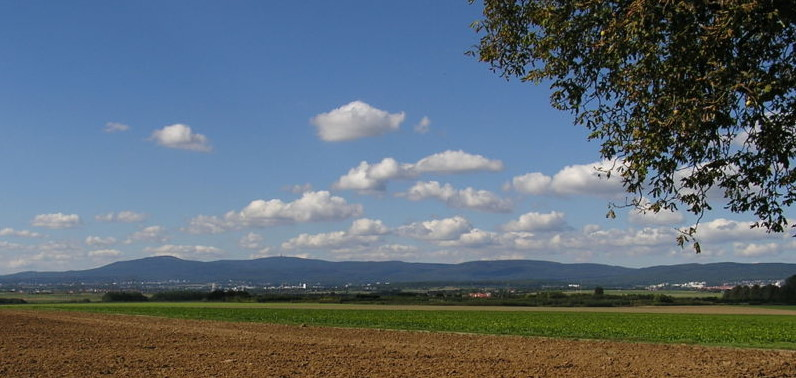
The Taunus with Großer Feldberg viewed from Karben

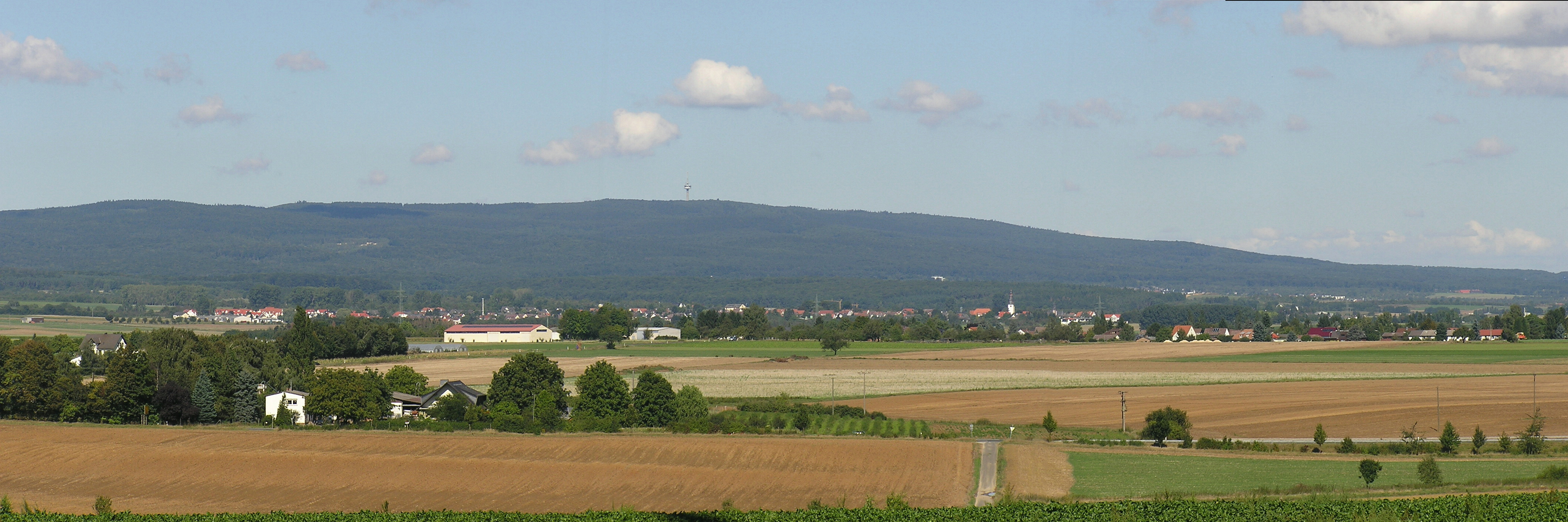
Mountain Steinkopf (with Typenturm radio tower), as seen from Karben

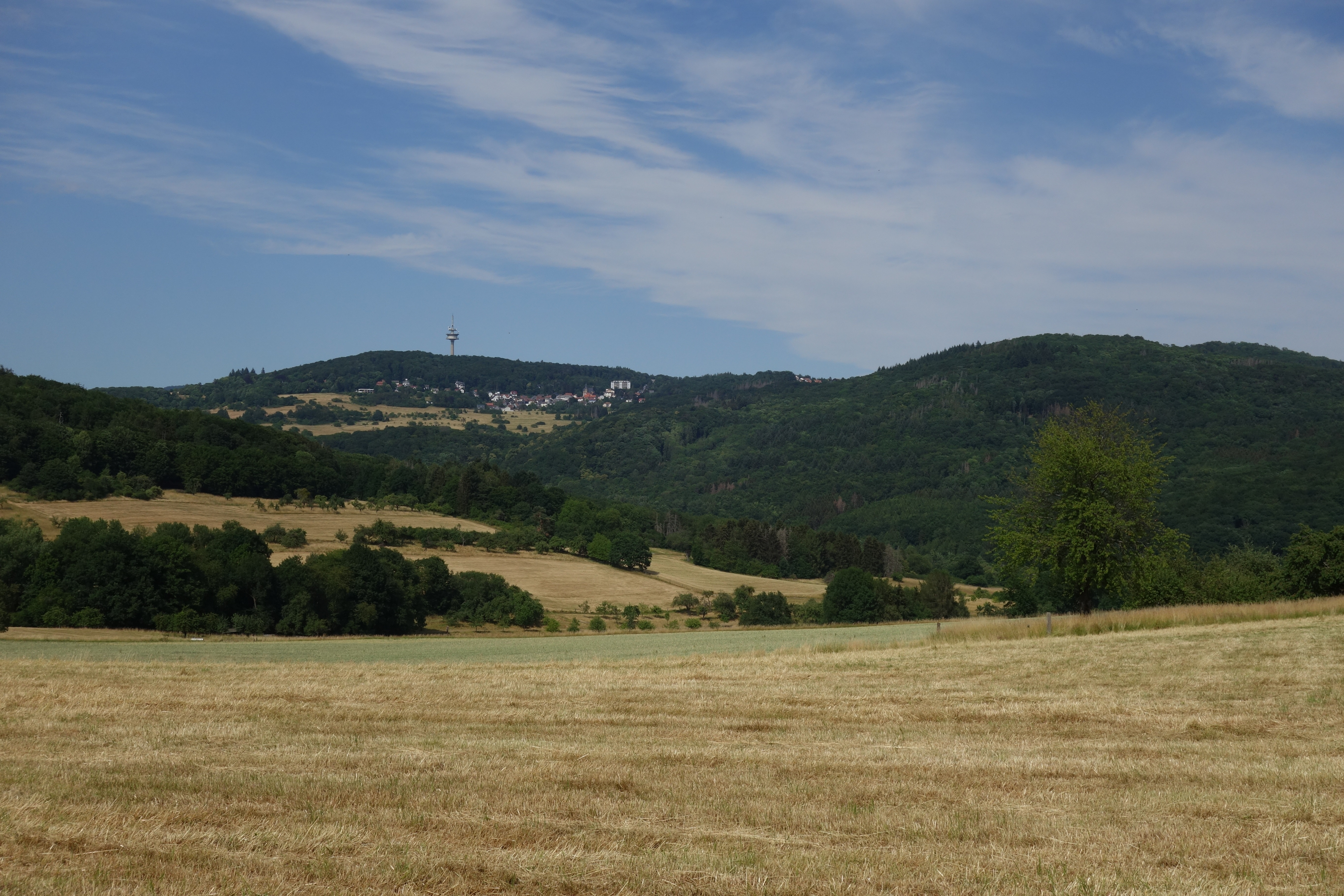
Rossert hilltop Hainkopf on the right belongs to the Anterior Taunus; Atzelberg mountain on the left is part of the High Taunus.

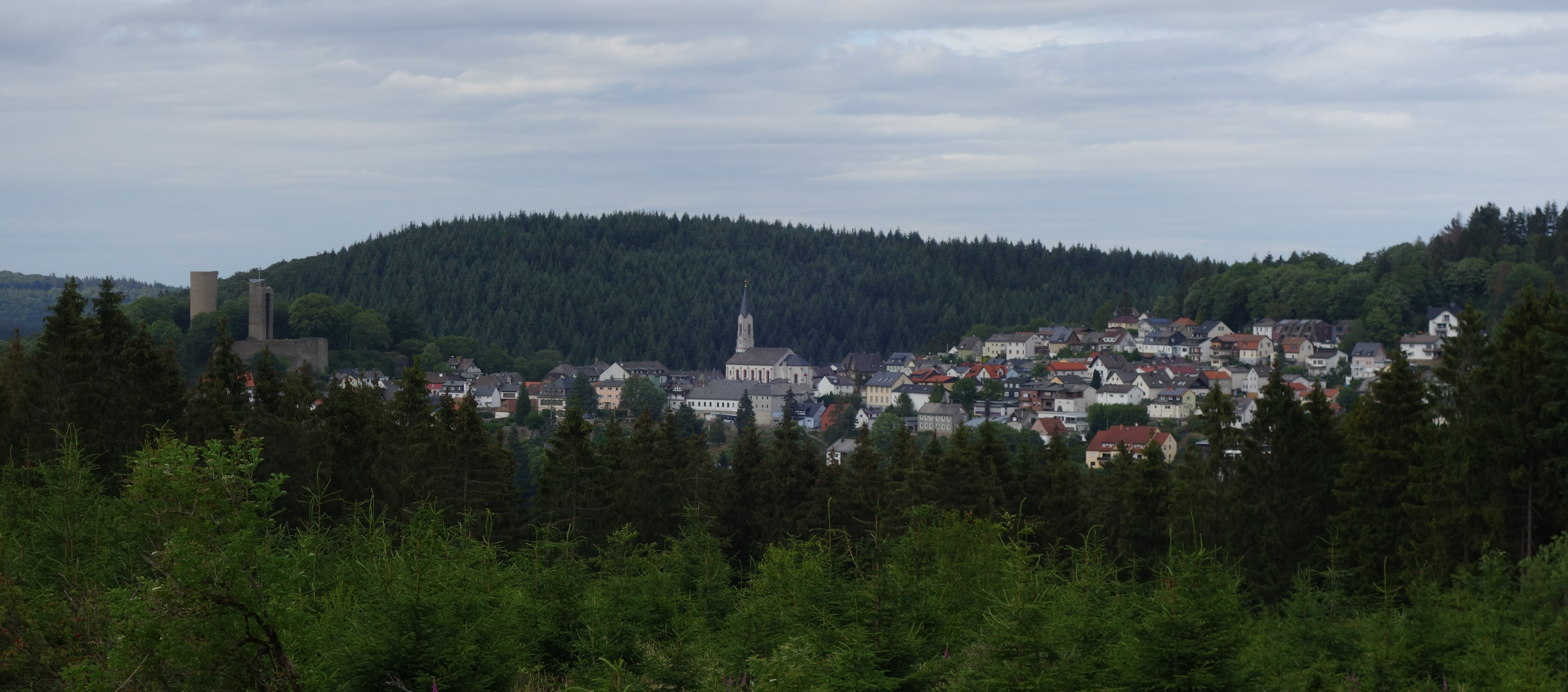
Oberreifenberg, constituent municipality of Schmitten, highest village of the Taunus with an average of 640 m, with Reifenberg Castle; Sängelberg mountain in the back

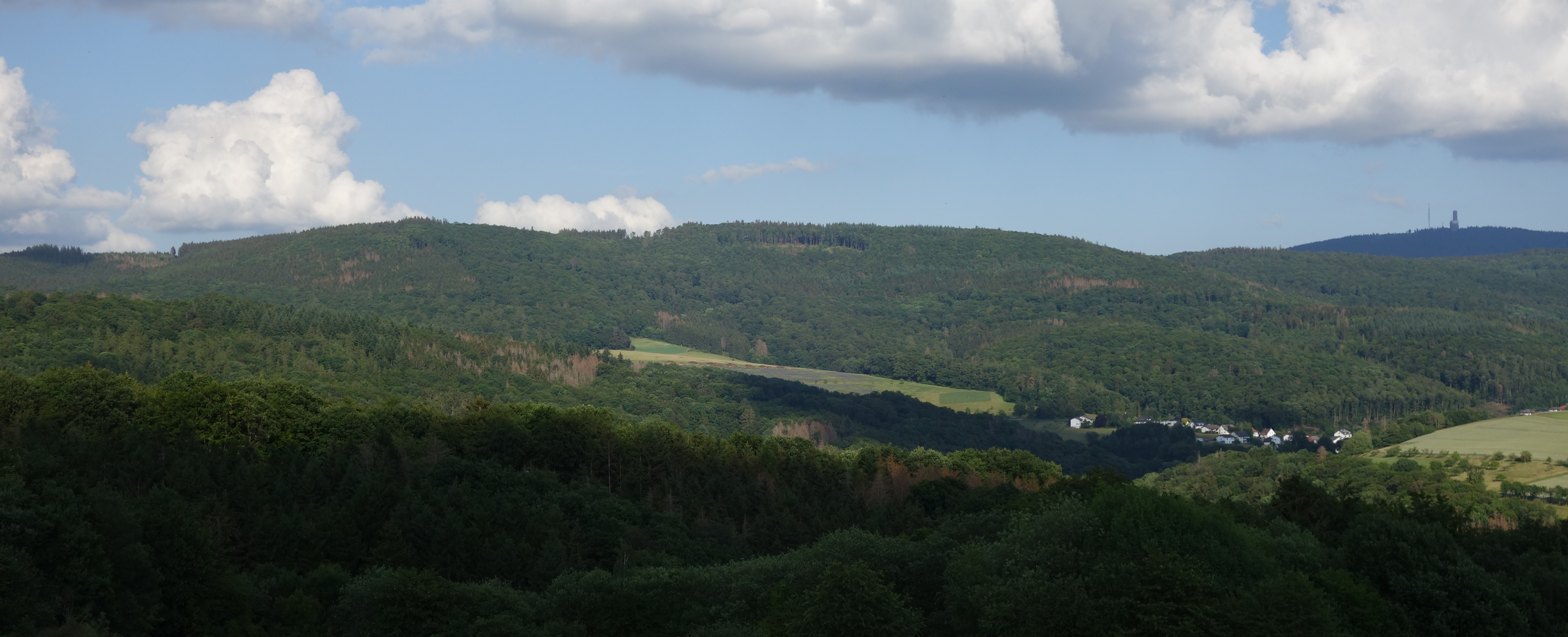
Windhain mountain (629,3 m), highest point of Rheingau-Taunus disctrict

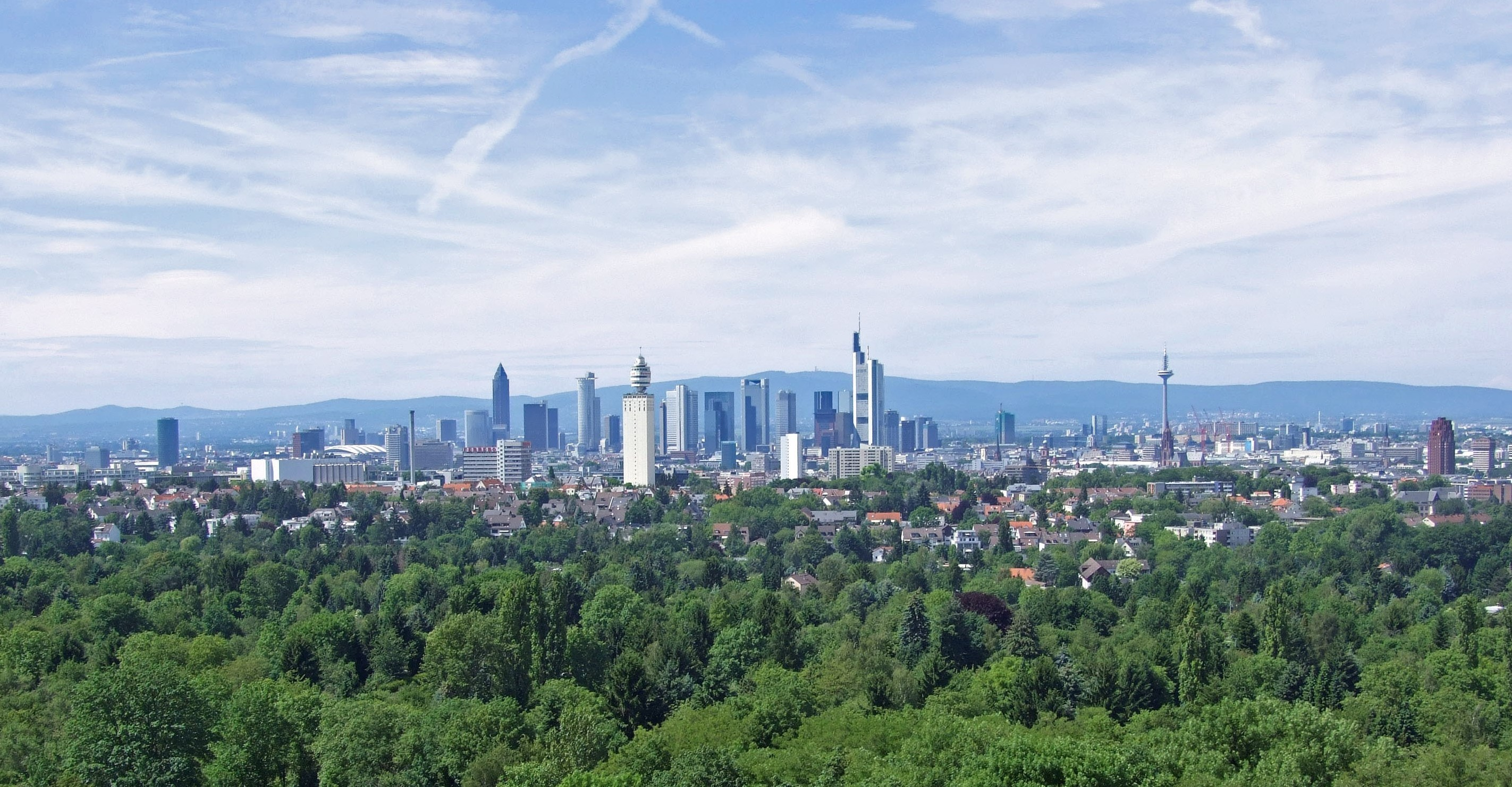
Frankfurt am Main, with Taunus range in the background
