= Iserlohn Heights =

Mountains in Germany

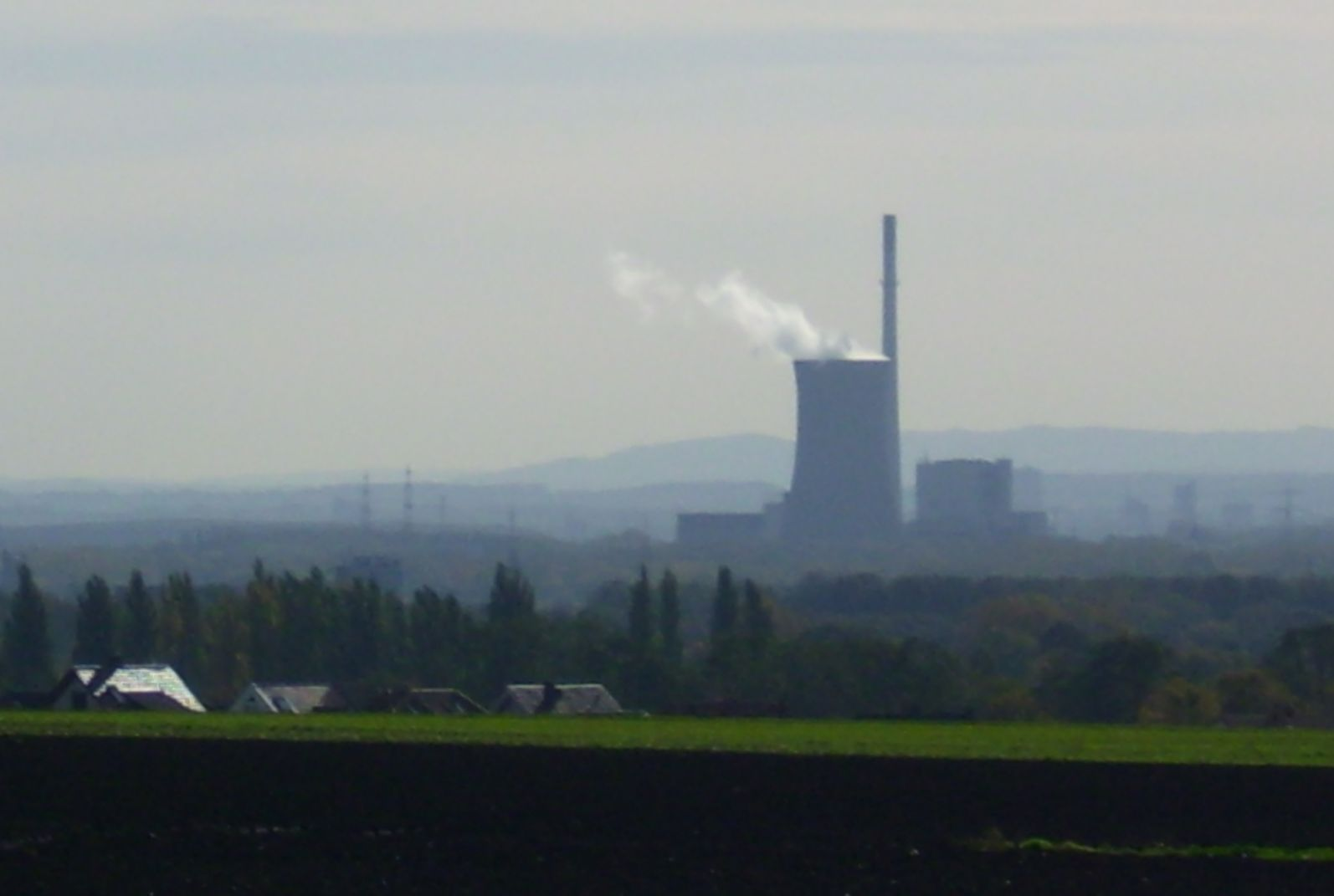
- Distant view from about 50 km to the northwest.

Highest point
- Peak: Balver Forest
- Elevation: 545.9 m (1,791 ft)

Geography
- Country: Germany
- Range coordinates: 51°19′49″N 7°44′10″E
- Parent range: Rhenish Massif

The Iserlohn Heights is a German highland rising up to 545.9 metres (1,791 ft) above sea level (Balve Forest to the northeast) in the Sauerland region of the Märkische, just south of the city of Iserlohn, with its center located approximately at (Hemer-)Ihmert.

== Geography ==
The Iserlohner Heights extends northward to the immediate vicinity of the central urban areas of Iserlohn and, to the east, Hemer's, and is bounded to the west and east by tributaries of the Ruhr flowing in northern directions.

The southwest boundary is the valley of the Lenne from below Werdohl over Altena to Lössel in the southwest of Iserlohn.

In contrast, the eastern boundary is the valley of the Hönne from Neuenrade via Balve including Volkringhausen to approximately the city limits of Hemer.
