= Stavelot Massif =

Map of Variscan terranes and structures in Belgium, Luxembourg, and adjacent areas in Germany, on which the Stavelot Massif is indicated. Early Paleozoic massifs have a dark pink colour.

The Stavelot Massif is a geological massif in the Belgian Ardenne (geologically a part of the Rhenish Massif). Most of the massif crops out in Belgium, but a small part lies across the border with Germany.

The massif consists of early Paleozoic (late Cambrian and Ordovician in age) metamorphic rocks, mostly quartzites and phyllites. In other parts of the Ardennes, they form a basement which is covered by only slightly metamorphosed late Paleozoic limestones and sandstones, that only saw a low degree of metamorphism. On the other hand, the early Paleozoic rocks were deformed and metamorphosed to a higher degree during the Ardennic phase (about 450 million years ago).

Both the Early Paleozoic basement and the low-grade cover rocks were deformed again during the Hercynian orogeny (about 350-280 million years ago). This phase of deformation created a large northeast-southwest-oriented anticline that runs across the Belgian part of the Rhenish Massif (the Ardennes anticline). In the core of this anticline a number of massifs of early Paleozoic rocks crop out. The Stavelot Massif is one of the larger, others are the Rocroi Massif, the Serpont Massif, and the Givonne Massif.

The higher competence of the Early Paleozoic basement rocks made them more resistant to erosion. The massif therefore forms a plateau in the topography. This plateau is called the High Fens and encompasses the highest summits of Belgium.
