= Kleiner Feldberg =

Mountain in Germany

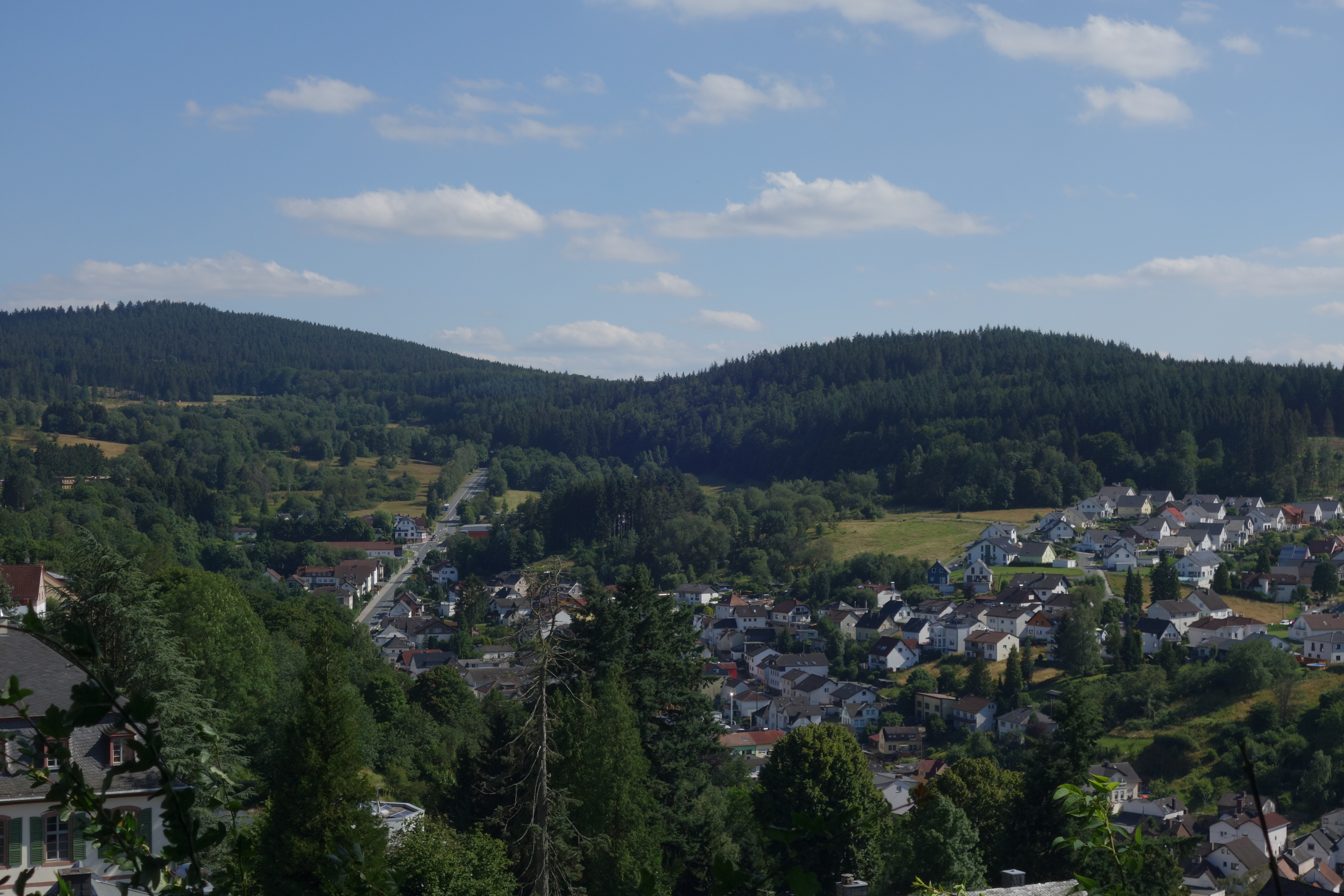
- Kleiner Feldberg (left), as seen from Reifenberg castle (Weilsberg mountain on the right)

Highest point
- Elevation: 826 m (2,710 ft)
- Prominence: 670 m (2,200 ft)
- Coordinates: 50°13′18″N 8°26′45″E

Geography
- Location within Hesse
- Location: Hesse, Germany
- Parent range: Taunus

The Kleiner Feldberg is the second-highest mountain in the Taunus mountain range, located in Hesse, Germany. It has an elevation of 826 metres (2,710 ft). The Großer Feldberg is located in its immediate neighbourhood.

== Observatory ==
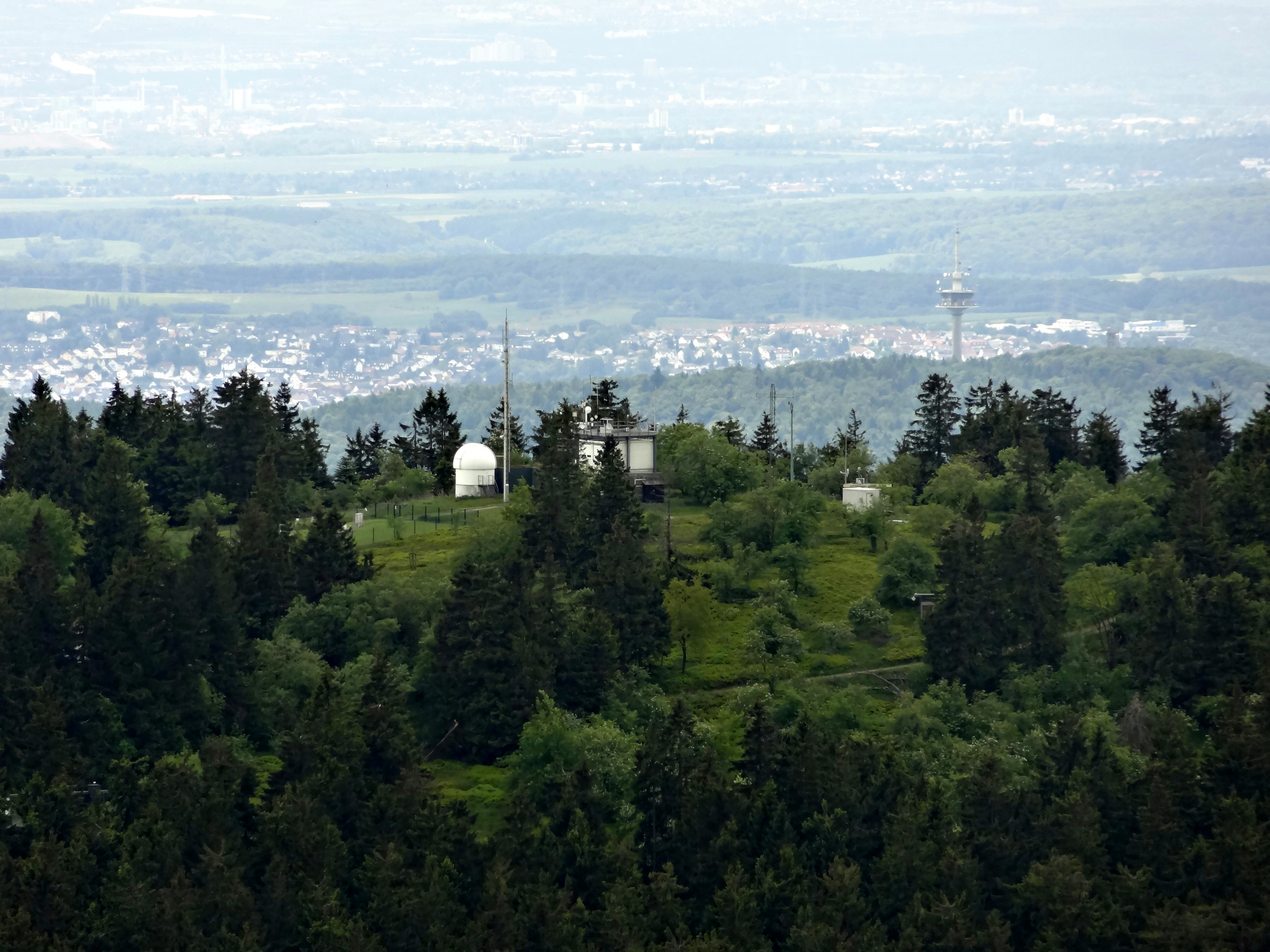
The observatory

In 1913, a meteorological and geophysical observatory was built there by German meteorologist Franz Linke. In 1988 an astronomical observatory was built on the mountain's top.

== Surroundings ==
The source of the Weil River and a small castle of the Limes Germanicus are located at its northern base.

== Climate ==
Climate data for Kleiner Feldberg: 822m (1991−2020)
Month	Jan	Feb	Mar	Apr	May	Jun	Jul	Aug	Sep	Oct	Nov	Dec	Year
Mean daily maximum °C (°F)	0.4 (32.7)	1.2 (34.2)	5.1 (41.2)	10.5 (50.9)	14.5 (58.1)	17.7 (63.9)	20.0 (68.0)	19.7 (67.5)	14.9 (58.8)	9.5 (49.1)	4.6 (40.3)	1.5 (34.7)	10.0 (49.9)
Daily mean °C (°F)	−1.6 (29.1)	−1.1 (30.0)	2.0 (35.6)	6.3 (43.3)	10.1 (50.2)	13.3 (55.9)	15.4 (59.7)	15.3 (59.5)	11.2 (52.2)	6.8 (44.2)	2.4 (36.3)	−0.5 (31.1)	6.6 (43.9)
Mean daily minimum °C (°F)	−3.4 (25.9)	−3.2 (26.2)	−0.7 (30.7)	2.9 (37.2)	6.5 (43.7)	9.6 (49.3)	11.8 (53.2)	11.8 (53.2)	8.5 (47.3)	4.5 (40.1)	0.6 (33.1)	−2.4 (27.7)	3.9 (39.0)
Average precipitation mm (inches)	82.7 (3.26)	70.6 (2.78)	75.2 (2.96)	56.1 (2.21)	89.2 (3.51)	81.9 (3.22)	90.5 (3.56)	73.5 (2.89)	83.8 (3.30)	85.5 (3.37)	84.9 (3.34)	96.8 (3.81)	970.7 (38.21)
Average precipitation days (≥ 1.0 mm)	18.7	17.3	17.6	14.0	15.0	14.4	15.4	14.7	14.5	16.5	19.6	20.5	199.5
Average relative humidity (%)	94.1	90.4	85.2	75.2	76.7	77.7	76.7	76.4	85.2	91.6	94.9	94.6	84.9
Source: NOAA

== See also ==
- List of mountains and hills of the Taunus
