= Hintertaunus =

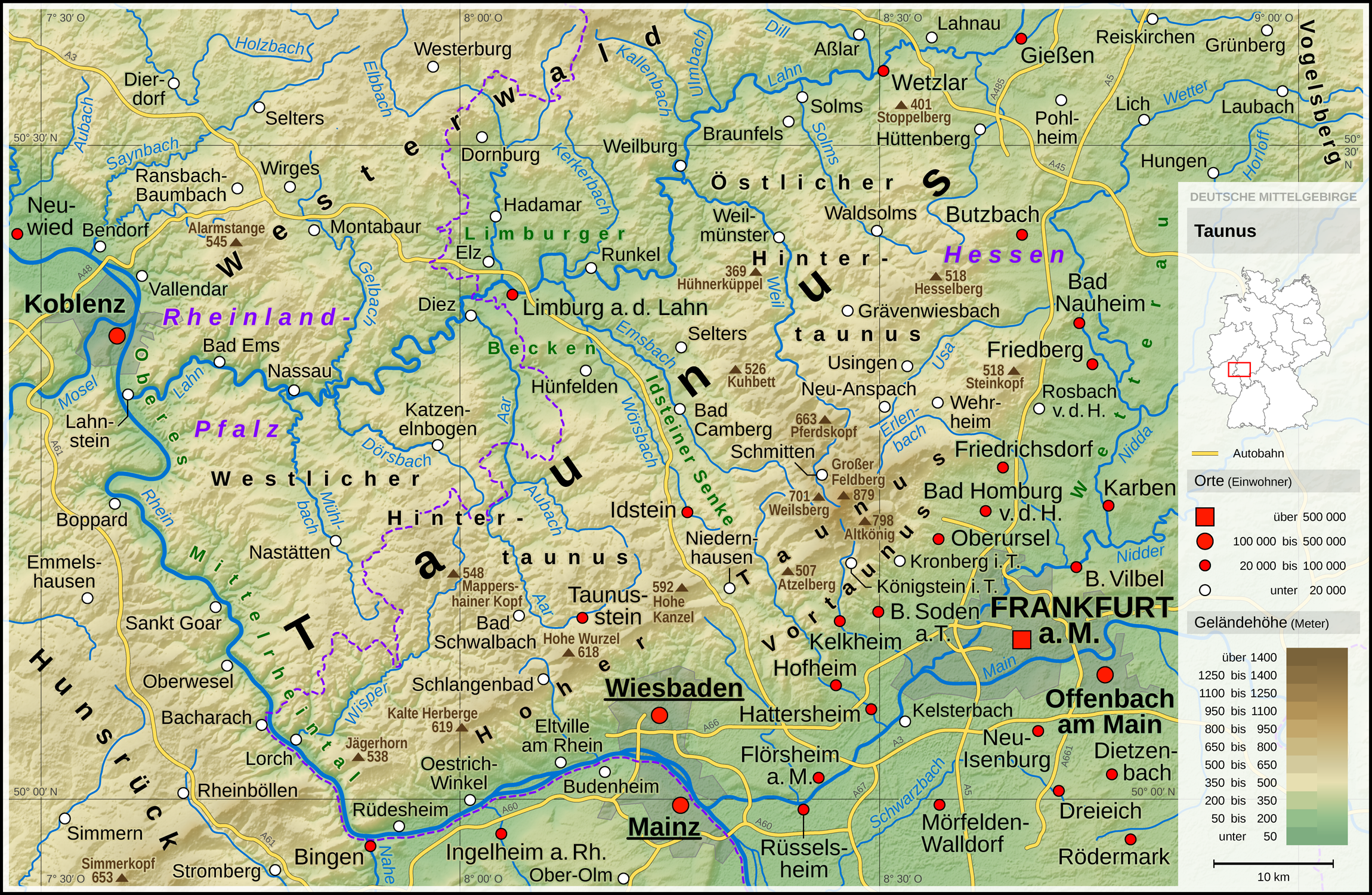
- Taunus overview map

Highest point
- Peak: Weilsberg
- Elevation: 700.7 m above NHN
- Coordinates: 50°12′32.4″N 8°13′48.50″E

Dimensions
- Area: 1,816.67 km^{2} (701.42 mi^{2})

Geography
- State(s): Hesse, Rhineland-Palatinate
- Parent range: Taunus

Geology
- Orogeny: Low mountains
- Rock type(s): Devonian slate, Hunsrück slate (rock facies), greywacke, occasional basaltic rock, corallian limestone

The Hintertaunus ("Rear Taunus") is a natural region in the German Central Upland range of the Taunus (major unit group 30), which rises to a height of 700.7 m above sea level (NHN) and lies north of the High Taunus (301). It extends as far as the river Rhine to the west, the river Lahn to the north and the Wetterau hills to the east. It is divided into the Eastern Hintertaunus (major unit 302), Idstein Basin (303) and Western Hintertaunus (304).

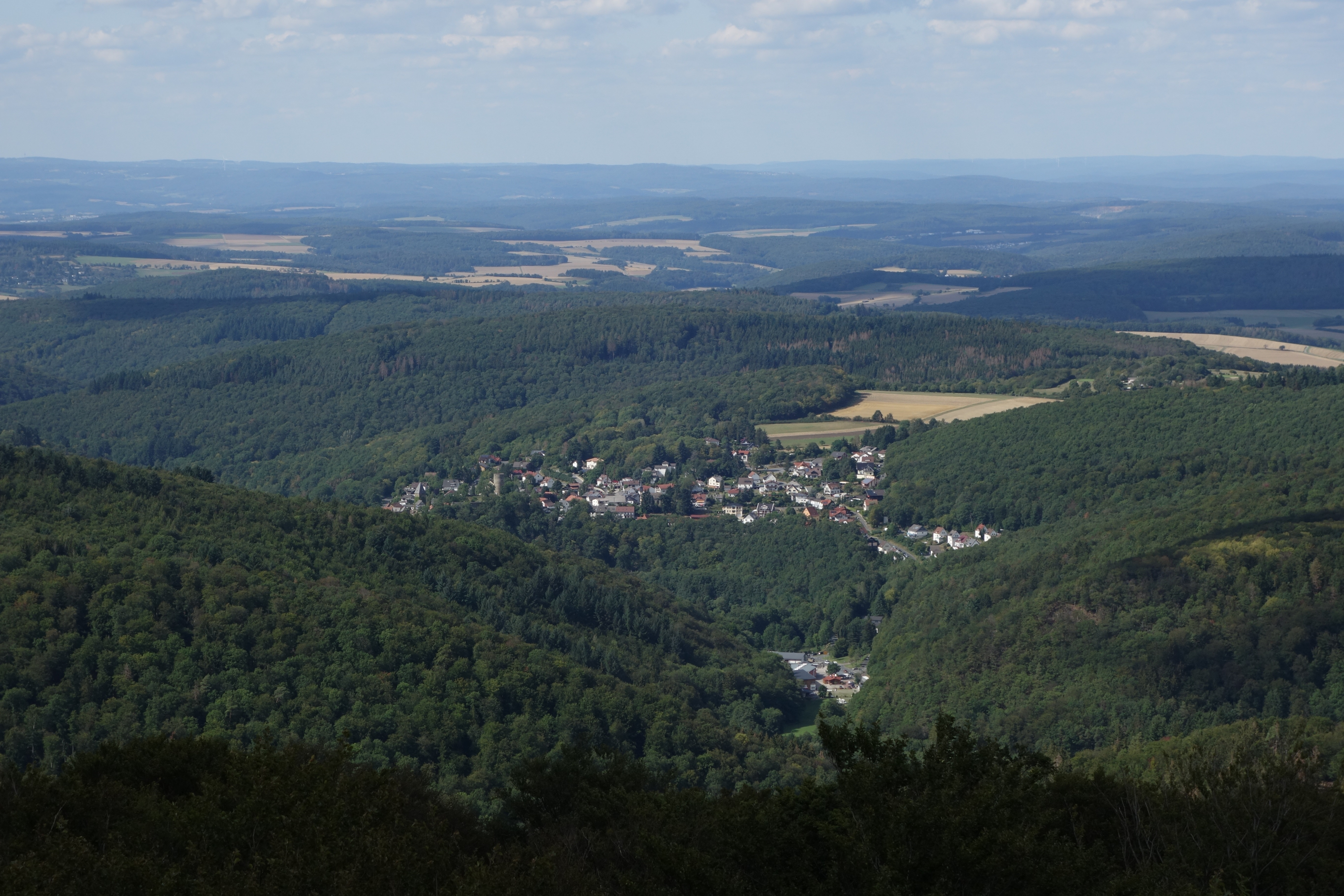
View from the observation tower on top of the mountain Pferdskopf (Taunus), facing Altweilnau (constituent community of Weilrod) and parts of the Hintertaunus, which flattens out to the north.
