= Hohlestein =

Hill in Hesse, Germany

Coordinates: 51°21′N 9°22′E

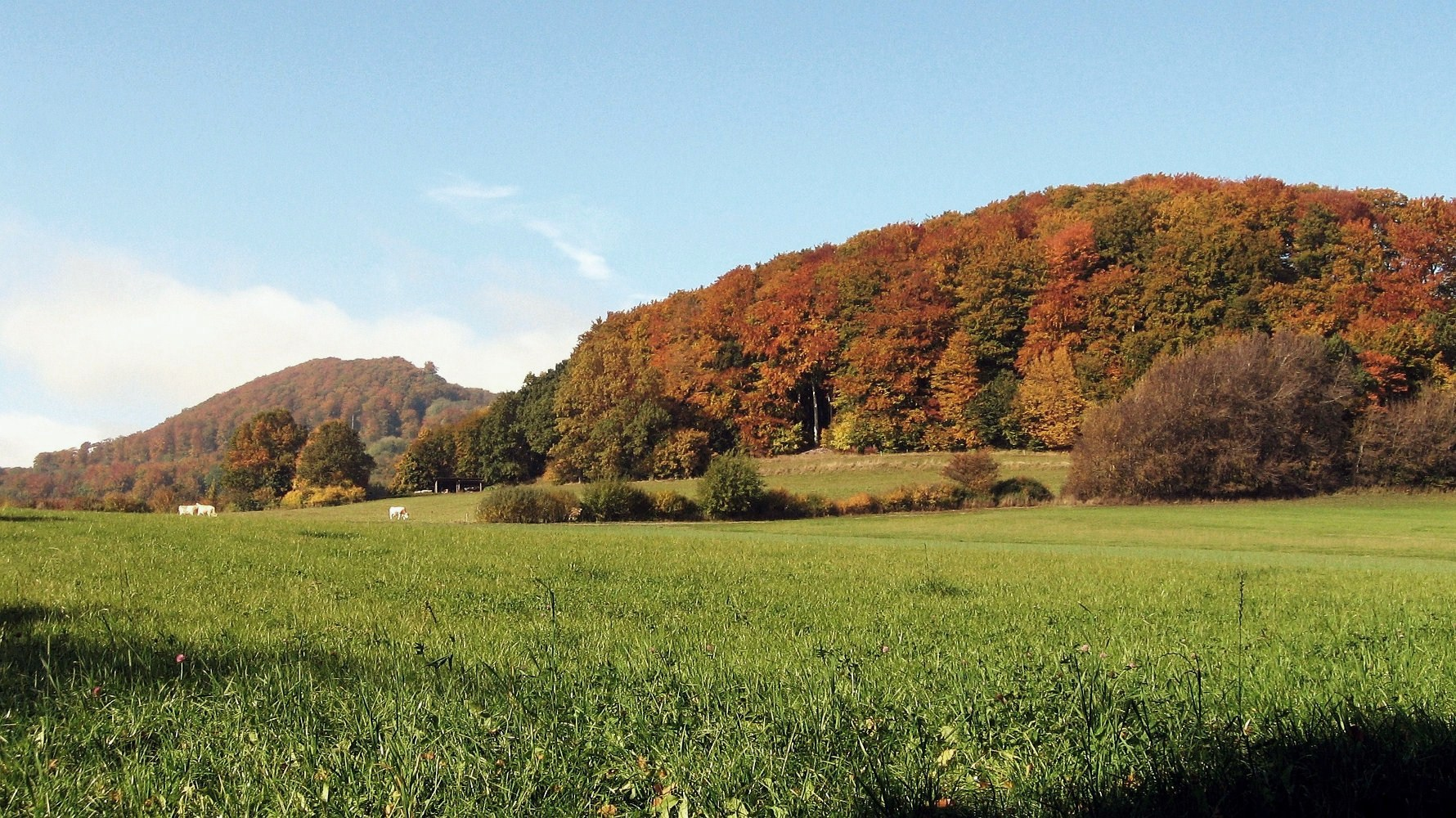
- The knoll on the right is the Hohlestein

Highest point
- Elevation: 476.6 m (1,564 ft)

Geography
- Location: Hesse, Germany

The Hohlestein is a hill in Hesse, Germany.
