= Lieber =

Lieber is a surname. Notable people with the surname include:

- Clara Lieber (1902–1982), an American chemist
- Charles M. Lieber (born 1959), professor of chemistry at Harvard University
- Ernst Maria Lieber (1838–1902), German politician
- Francis Lieber (1800–1872), jurist, author of the Lieber Code
- Jeffrey Lieber, screenwriter
- Jon Lieber (born 1970), baseball player
- Larry Lieber (born 1931), comic book writer
- Lillian Rosanoff Lieber (1886–1986), mathematician and author
- Maxim Lieber (1897–1993), American literary agent and communist spy in the 1930s
- Michael Lieber, British actor
- Moriz Lieber (1790–1860), German politician and publisher
- Richard Lieber (1869–1944), conservationist
- Rochelle Lieber, linguist
- Stan Lee (born Stanley Lieber) (1922–2018), comic book writer

== See also ==
- Leiber
- Jerry Leiber and Mike Stoller, American record producers and songwriters
