= Kreuzkapelle, Bad Camberg =

Catholic pilgrimage church

Kreuzkapelle
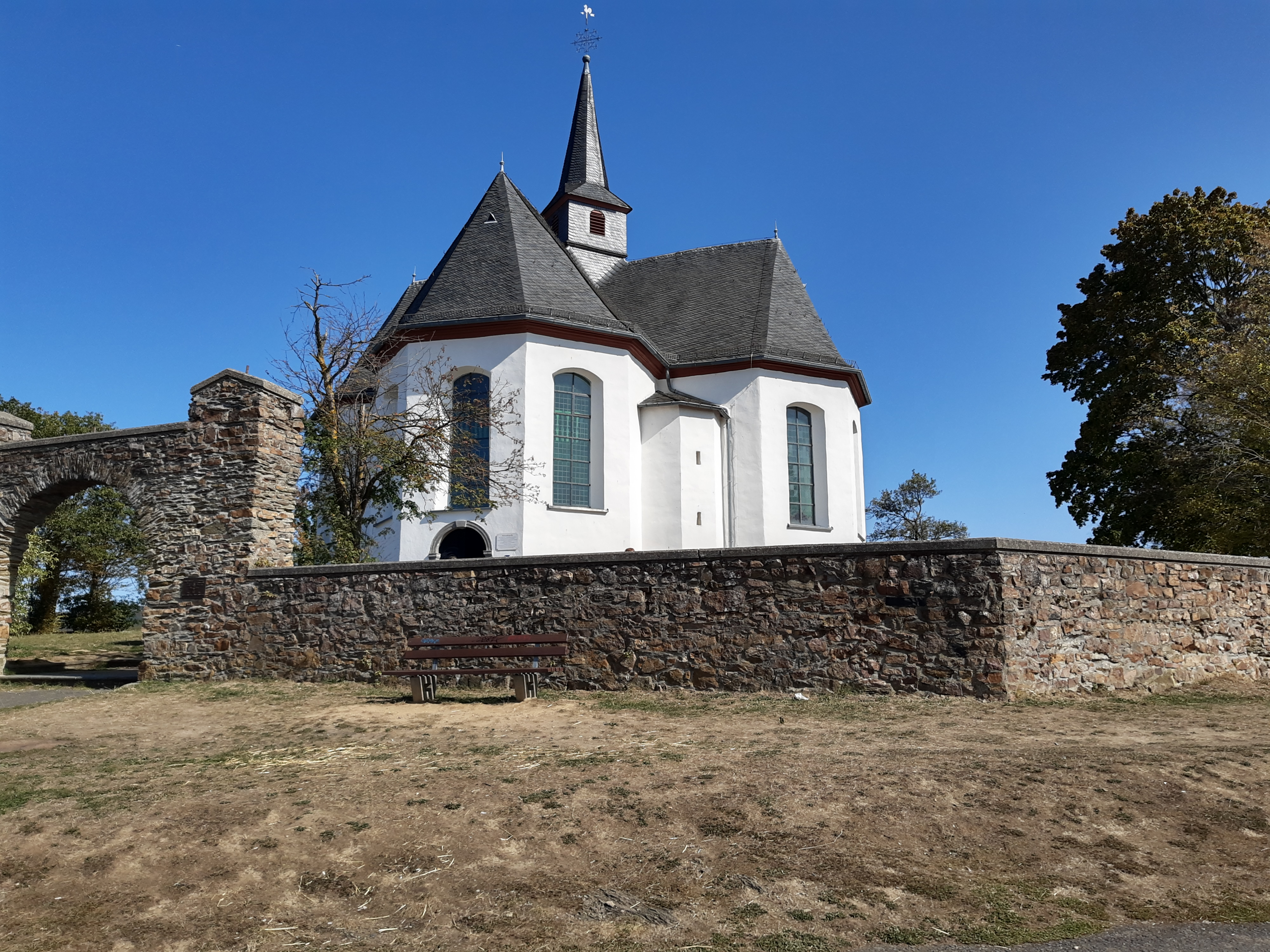
- Exterior

- Location within Hesse Location within Germany

Religion
- Affiliation: Catholic
- Province: Diocese of Limburg
- Rite: Latin
- Ecclesiastical or organizational status: Pilgrimage church
- Year consecrated: 1682

Location
- Location: Bad Camberg, Hesse, Germany
- Interactive map of Kreuzkapelle
- Coordinates: 50°18′27″N 8°17′10″E

Architecture
- Style: Baroque
- Completed: 1683

The Kreuzkapelle (German pronunciation: [ˈkʁɔʏtskaˌpɛlə]) is a chapel of the Holy Cross, a Catholic pilgrimage church in Bad Camberg, Hesse, Germany, dedicated to the Holy Cross. It is a landmark of the town, located on higher ground to the north-east. A Kreuzweg with stations of the Cross leads from Bad Camberg to the chapel.

== History ==
The chapel was built from 1681 to 1683 on a ridge running north-east out of Bad Camberg, overlooking the Goldgrund area and the town. It was initiated by the Hohenfeld family, which also built a Kreuzweg with stations of the Cross around 1700, leading from Camberg up to the chapel.

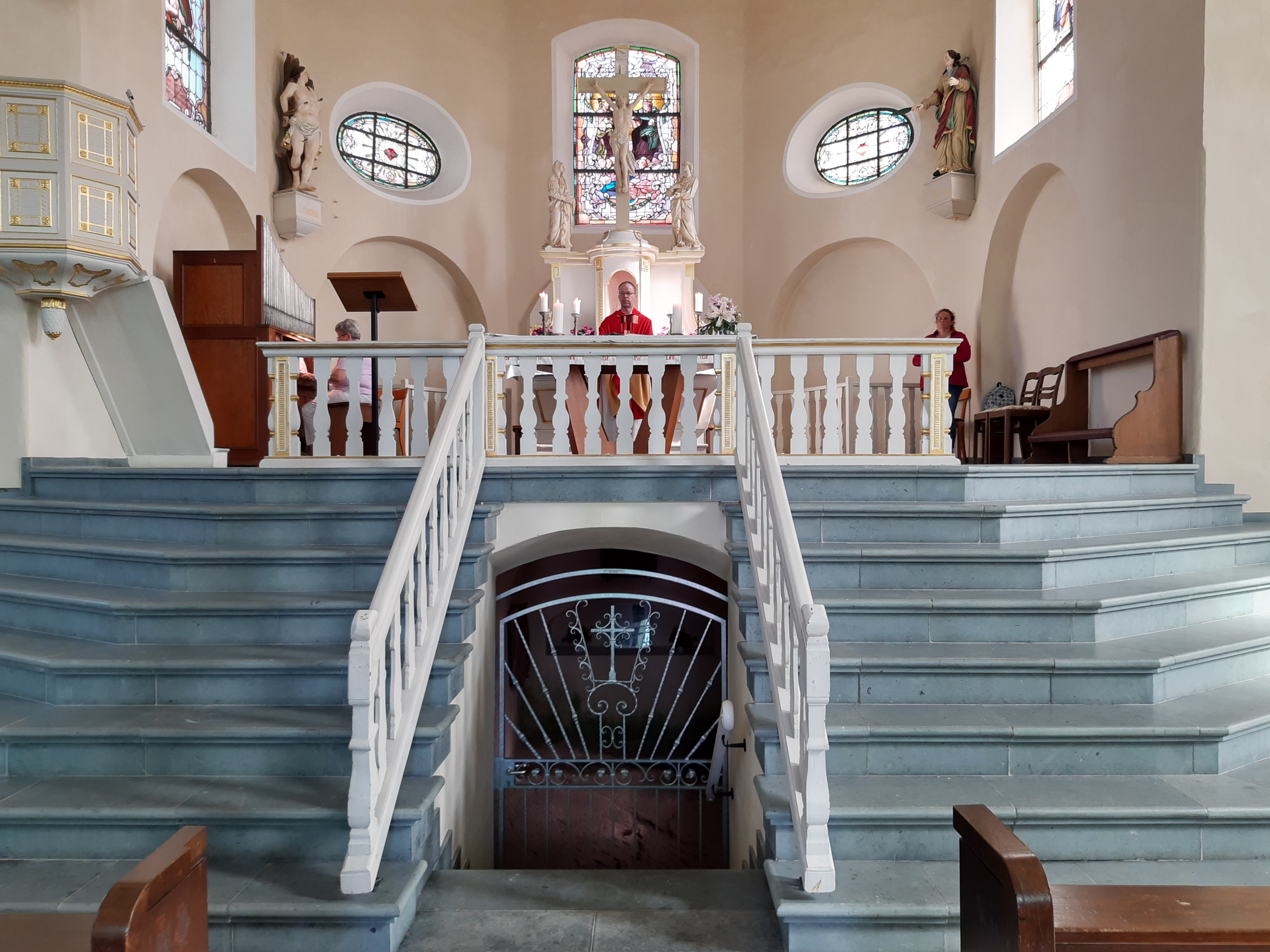
Interior, September 2020

The chapel was first built as an octagon located where the choir is now. It was expanded in 1725 to a symmetrical central building (Zentralbau) shaped like a Greek cross. While three of its arms are closed on floor level, the choir is elevated and can be reached by symmetrical stairs. It is dominated by a crucifix. A crypt below the choir is hewn in the rock, holding the shrine of a cross relic.

The upper church features wooden vaults, and several altars from the 18th century. The meadow around the chapel and the sexton's house is surrounded by a wall with eight sides. Seven stations of the cross along the Kreuzweg, by the Hadamar school of sculpture, are replicas of weathered originals which are held in the crypt. Stained glass windows, donated by citizens of Camberg, were added around 1900.

The chapel was a centre of the Catholic youth movement until 1933. Exterior and interior were restored by volunteers from 1975. The chapel is a landmark of Bad Camberg. When the anniversary of the building was celebrated in 1982, a priest wrote that the chapel is a sermon about the cross, and believers come bringing the "crosses" in their lives.

The building is listed in the Hague Convention for protection in the event of armed conflict.
