= Leiber =

Leiber is a German surname. Notable people with the surname include:

- Fridolin Leiber (1853–1912), German painter
- Fritz Leiber (1910–1992), American writer of fantasy, horror and science fiction.
- Fritz Leiber, Sr. (1882–1949), American actor
- Hank Leiber (1911–1983), American baseball player
- Jerry Leiber (1933–2011), American songwriter and record producer
- John Leiber (1977), 37th treasurer of Wisconsin
- Judith Leiber (1921–2018), American fashion designer
- Justin Leiber (1938–2016), American philosopher and science fiction writer
- Robert Leiber (1887–1967), German Roman Catholic priest

== See also ==
- Nickname for members of the Royal Bavarian Infantry Lifeguards Regiment (Leibregiment)
- Lieber
