= Bad Camberg =

- Town
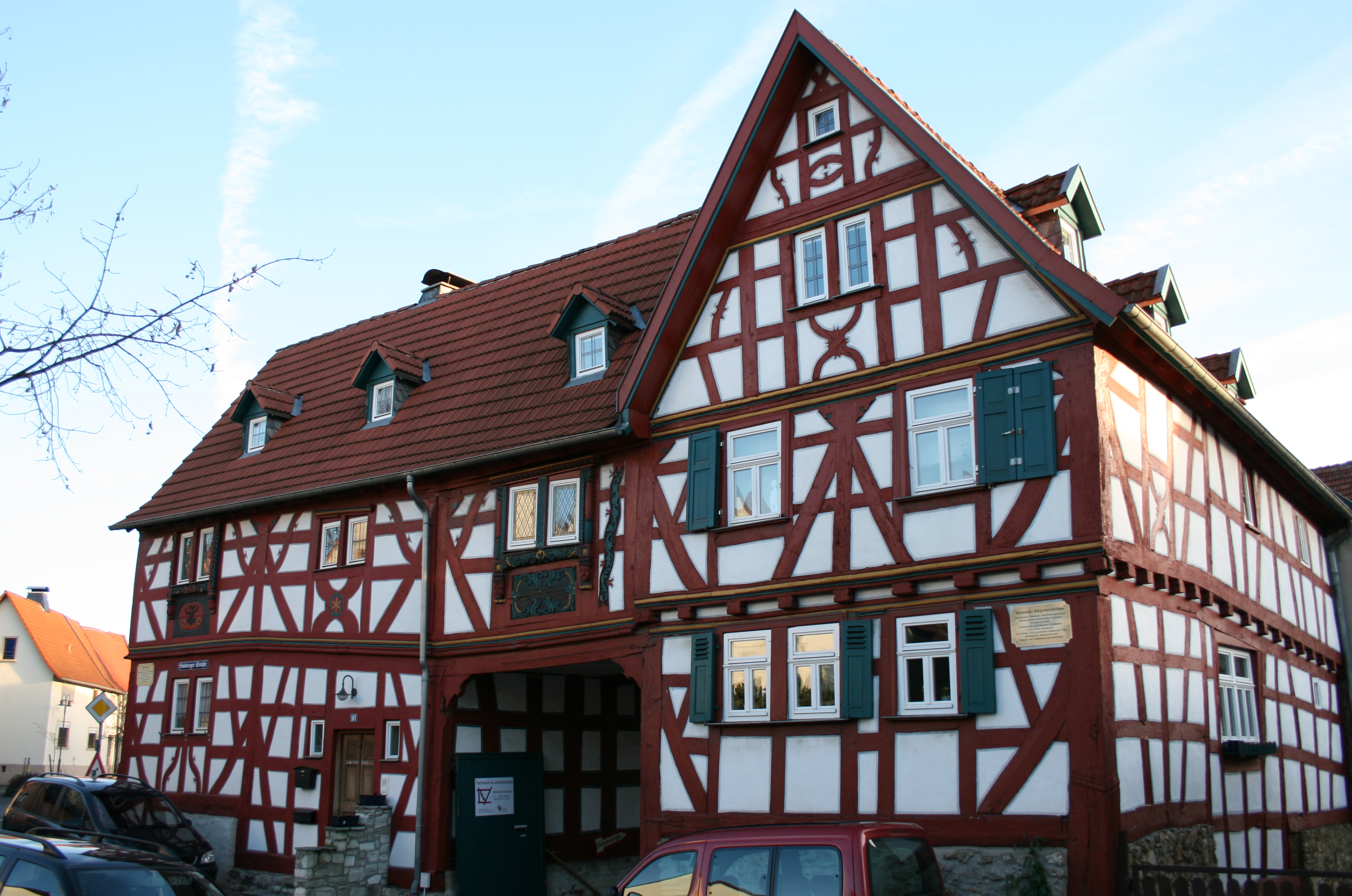
- Old mayor’s house in Erbach

- Flag Coat of arms

- Location of Bad Camberg within Limburg-Weilburg district
- Interactive map of Bad Camberg
- Location within Germany Location within Hesse
- Coordinates: 50°18′N 8°16′E
- Country: Germany
- State: Hesse
- Admin. region: Gießen
- District: Limburg-Weilburg

Government
  - Mayor (2022–28): Daniel Rühl (CDU)

Area
  - Total: 54.6 km^{2} (21.1 sq mi)
- Elevation: 209 m (686 ft)

Population (2025-12-31)
  - Total: 14,134
  - Density: 259/km^{2} (670/sq mi)
- Time zone: UTC+01:00 (CET)
  - Summer (DST): UTC+02:00 (CEST)
- Postal codes: 65520
- Dialling codes: 06434, 06483
- Vehicle registration: LM, WEL
- Website: www.bad-camberg.de

Bad Camberg (German: [baːt ˈkambɛʁk]) is, with 14,500 inhabitants, the second largest town in Limburg-Weilburg district in Hesse, Germany, as well as the southernmost town in the Regierungsbezirk of Gießen. It is located in the eastern Taunus in the Goldener Grund (“Golden Ground”) some 30 km north of Wiesbaden, 18 km southeast of Limburg an der Lahn, and 44 km northwest of Frankfurt, as well as on the German Timber-Frame Road. Bad Camberg is the central community of the Goldener Grund with good infrastructure, and a lower centre partly with a middle centre's function.

The recognized Kneipp resort is Hesse's oldest and Germany's third oldest. In the outlying centre of Oberselters is found a mineral spring that gives forth the well known Selterswasser, often known in English as “seltzer”. The town's landmark is the Kreuzkapelle.

== Geography ==
=== Location ===
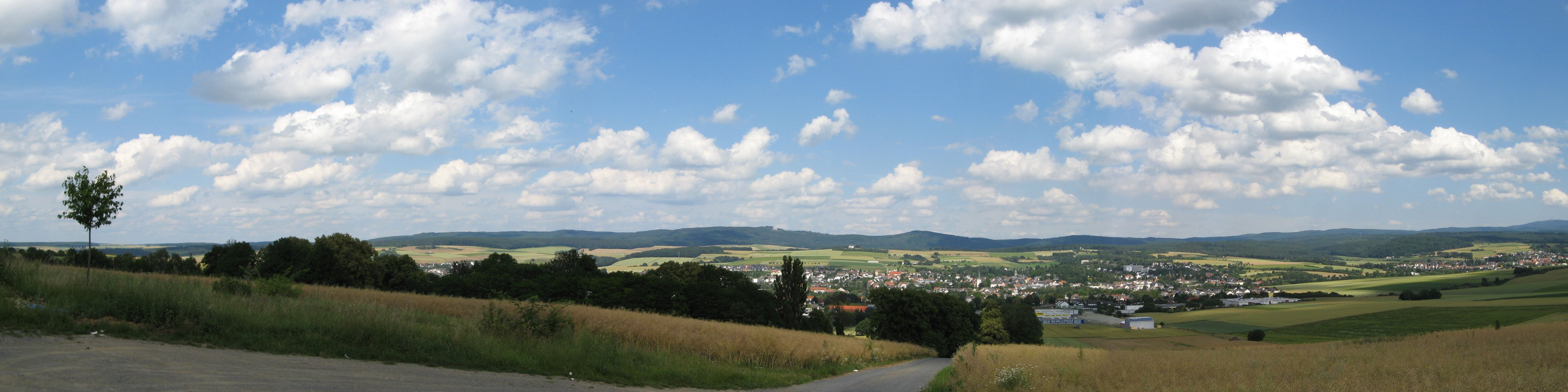
Panorama of Bad Camberg seen from a spot near the Autobahn interchange; in the background the peaks of the Taunus

Bad Camberg lies north of the Taunus’s main ridge, 18 km southeast of Limburg an der Lahn, making it Middle Hesse’s southernmost town. The nearest cities are (distances given here are by road) Wiesbaden (31 km south), Frankfurt am Main (48 km southeast, 59 km by Autobahn), Wetzlar (49 km), Koblenz (72 km), and Gießen (75 km).

=== Heights ===
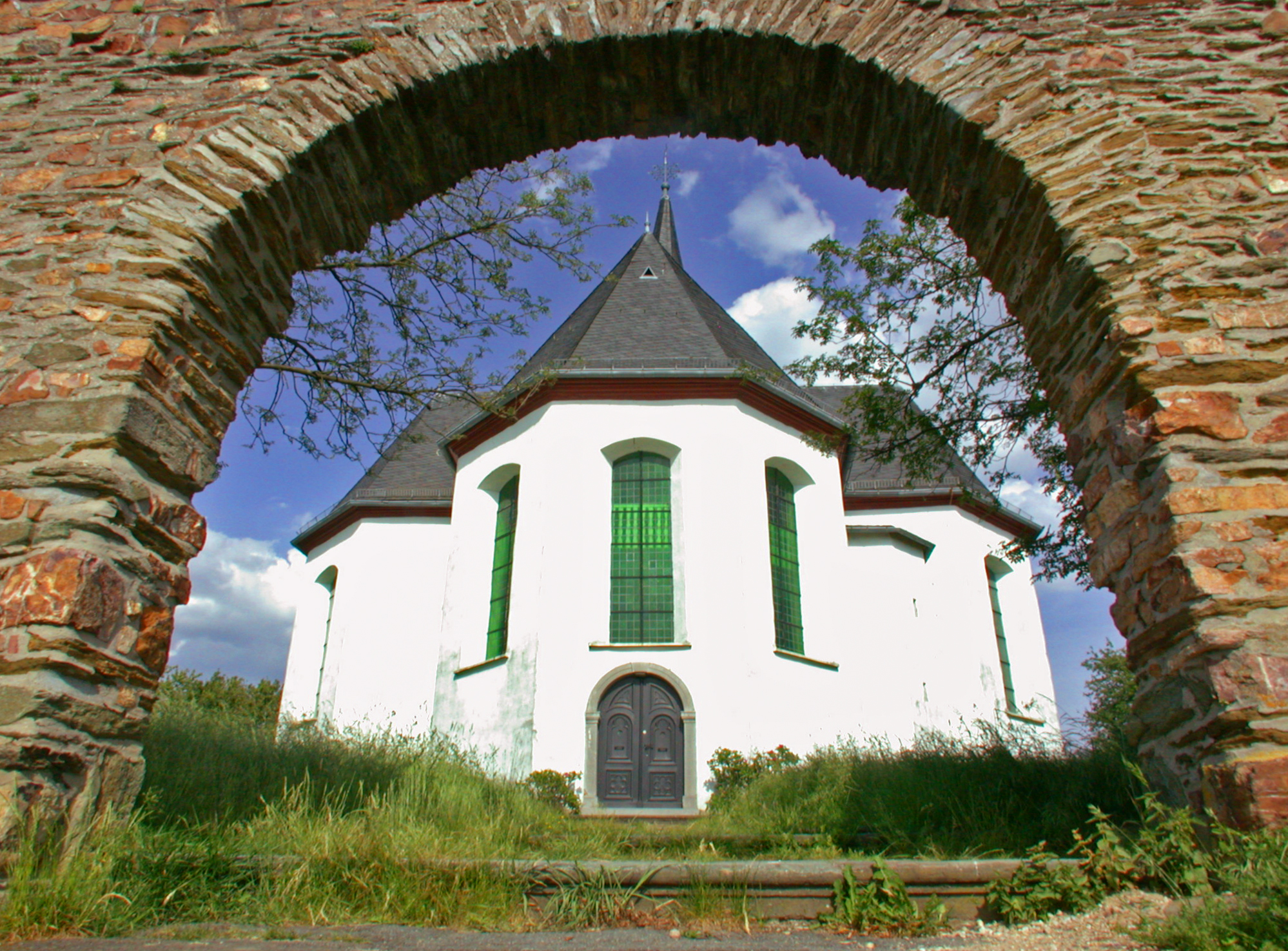
Kreuzkapelle

The town’s elevation is 209 m. The Limburg-Weilburg district’s highest elevation, the Kuhbett (“Cow’s Bed”; 526 m), lies within the limits of the outlying centre of Erbach on the boundary with the community of Weilrod in the Hochtaunuskreis. The greatest elevation in the central community – also called Bad Camberg – is the Kapellenhügel (“Chapel Hill”), which is somewhat more than 300 m high.

=== Neighbouring communities ===
Bad Camberg's neighbours are, clockwise from the north, Selters (Limburg-Weilburg), Weilrod (Hochtaunuskreis), Waldems (Rheingau-Taunus-Kreis), Idstein (Rheingau-Taunus-Kreis), Hünstetten (Rheingau-Taunus-Kreis) and Hünfelden (Limburg-Weilburg). All but the two lying within Limburg-Weilburg lie not in the Regierungsbezirk of Gießen, but rather in the Regierungsbezirk of Darmstadt.

=== Constituent communities ===
The town comprises six Stadtteile.

Stadtteil	Population	Area	Wooded in km^{2}	in %	Pop. density
Bad Camberg (main town)	6,903	19.91	10.89	54.7	346.7
Erbach	2,804	10.66	4.91	46.0	263.0
Würges	2,545	13.82	6.27	45.4	184.1
Oberselters	1,173	4.22	0.84	19.9	278.0
Schwickershausen	585	2.77	0.66	23.8	211.2
Dombach	382	3.26	1.38	42.3	105.5
Totals	14,397	54.64	24.95	45.7	263.5

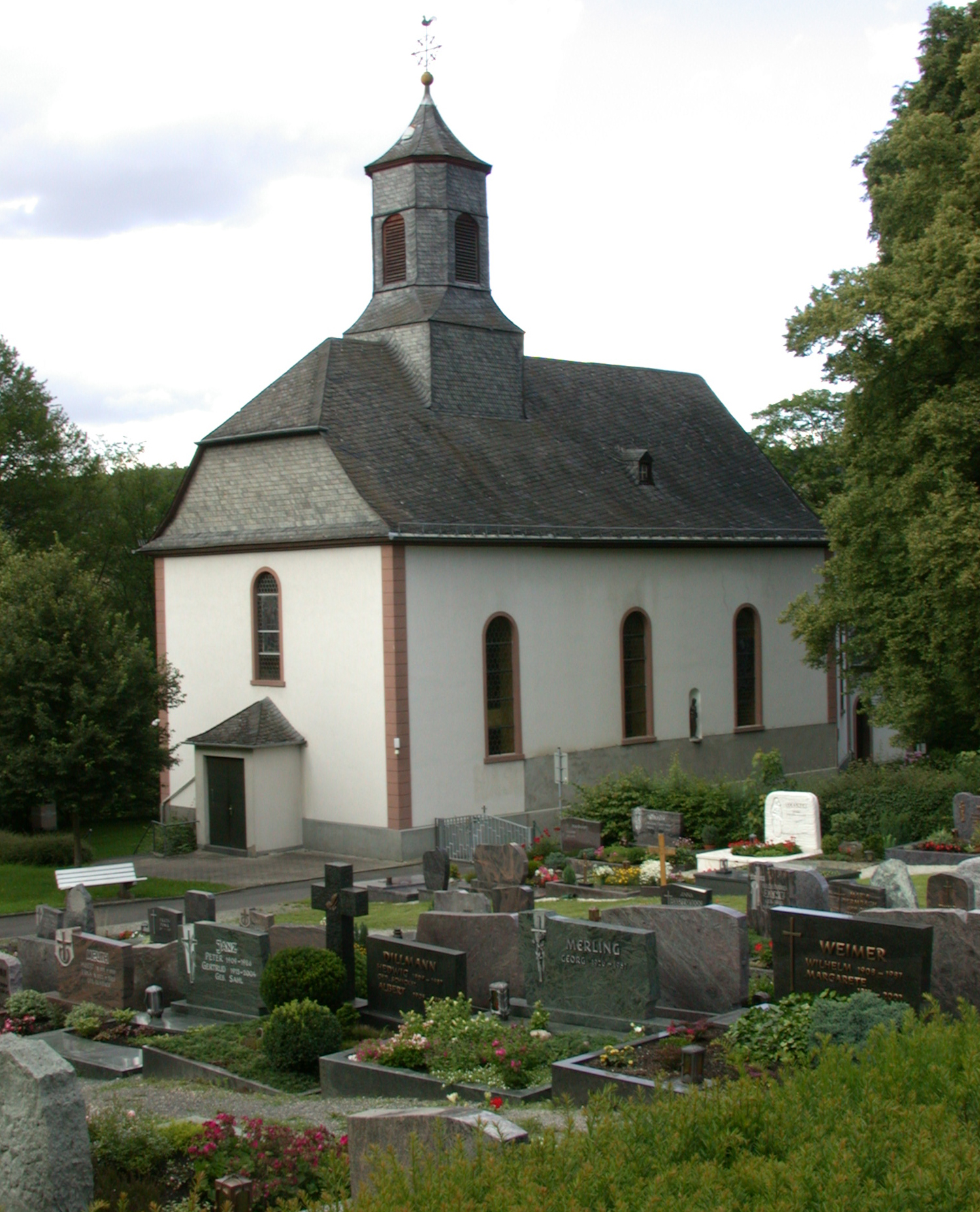
St. George's parish church in Schwickershausen

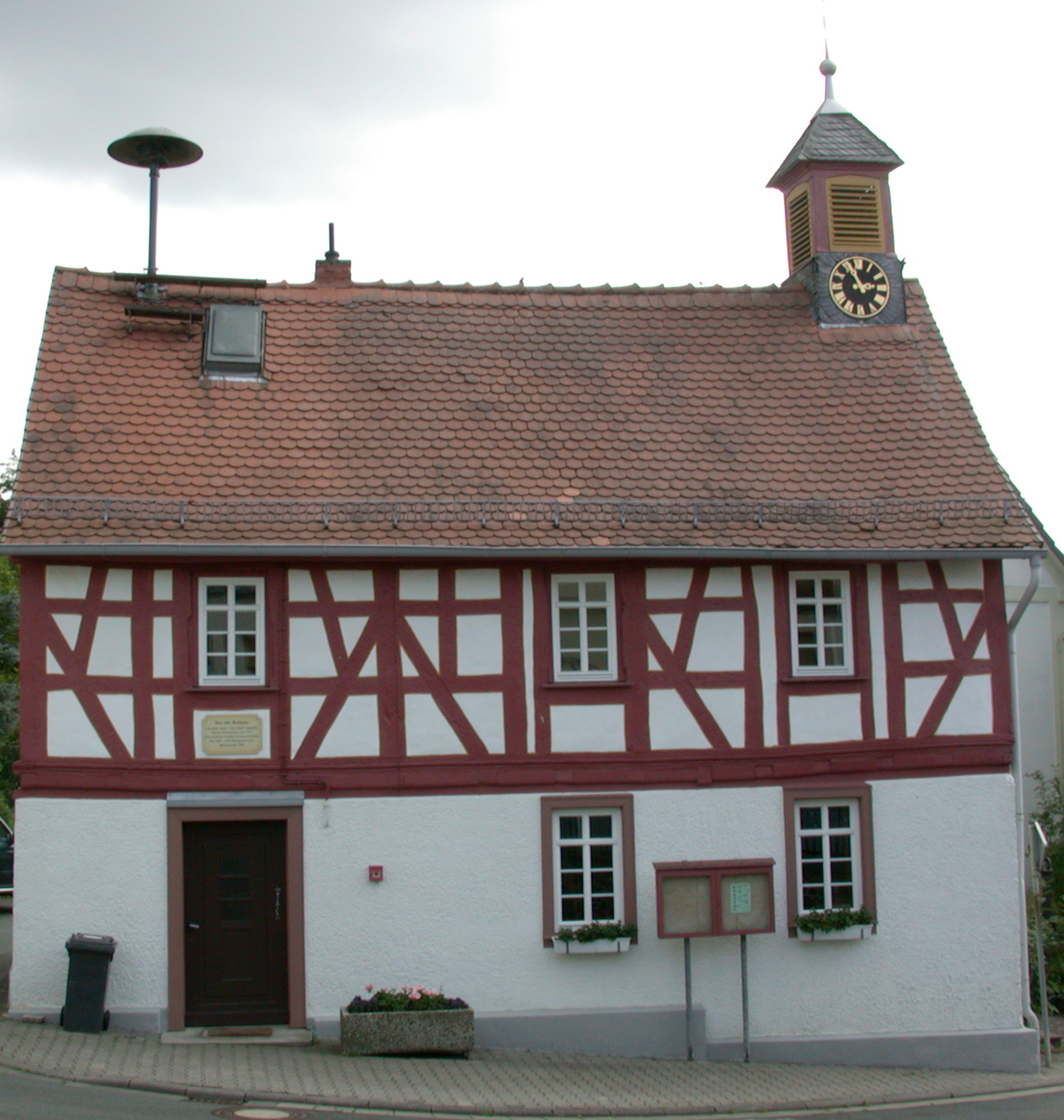
Old town hall in Dombach, eaves side

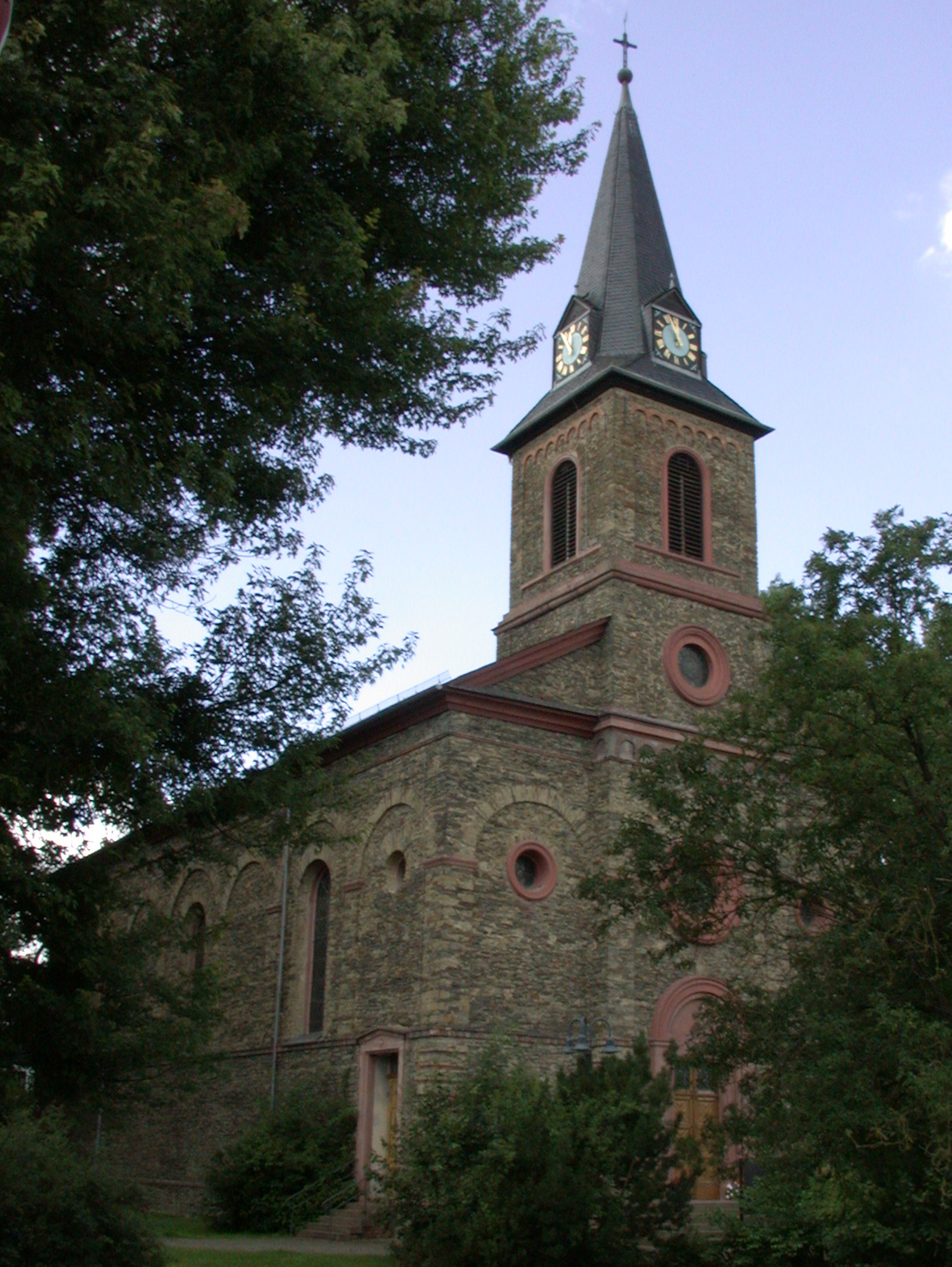
St. Ferrutius's parish church in Würges, side view

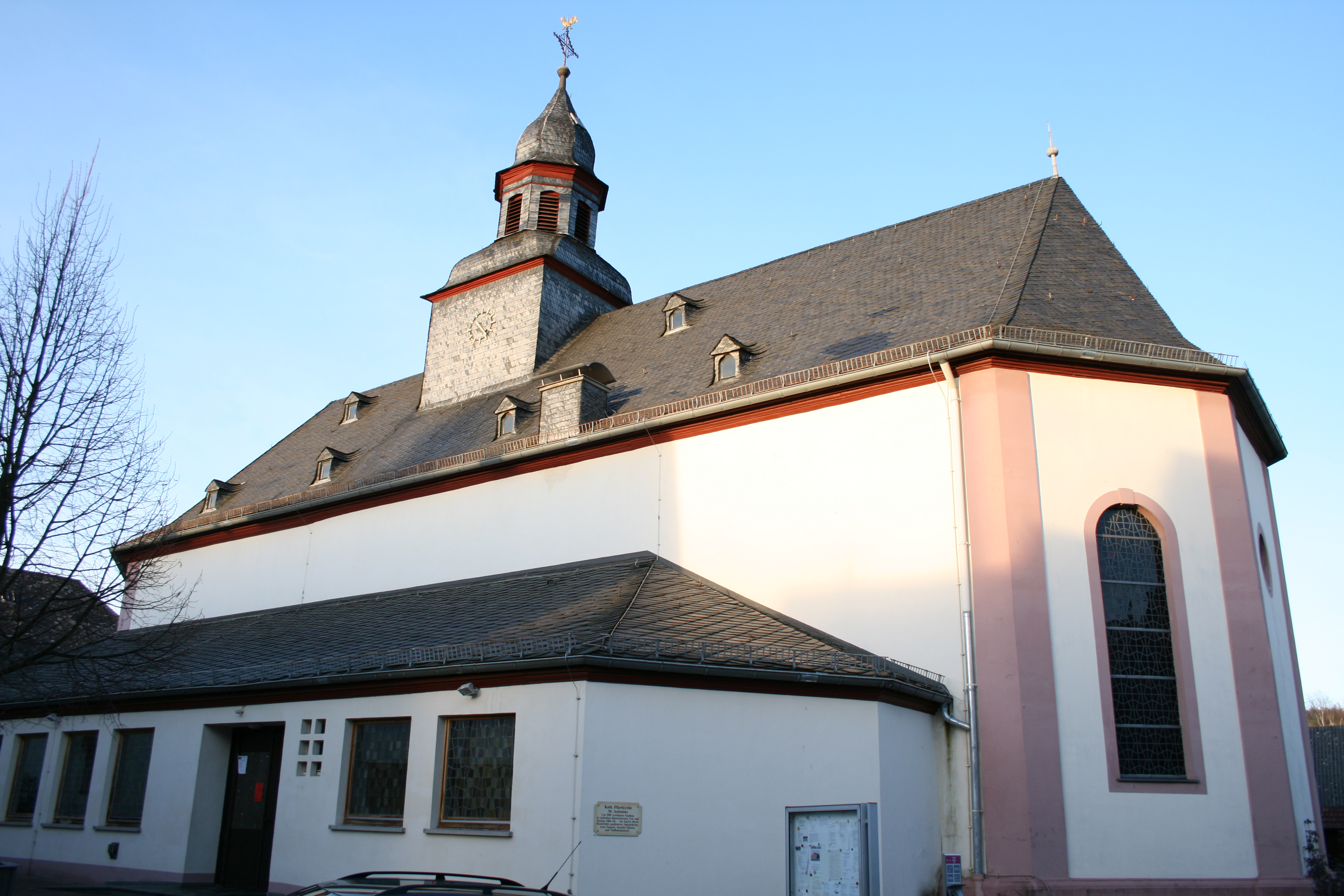
St. Anthony's church in Oberselters

== History ==
=== Early history ===
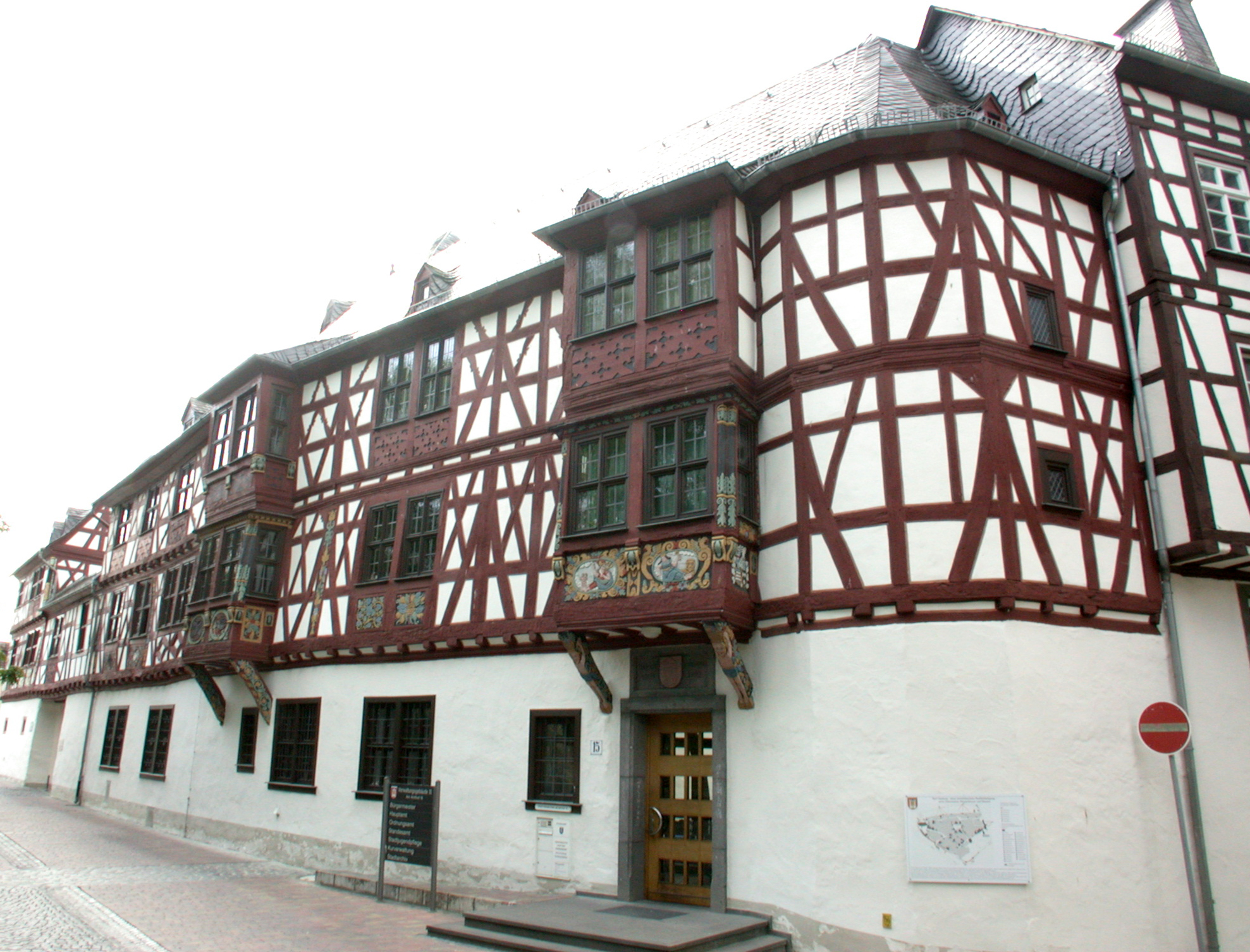
Southwest façade of the Amthof

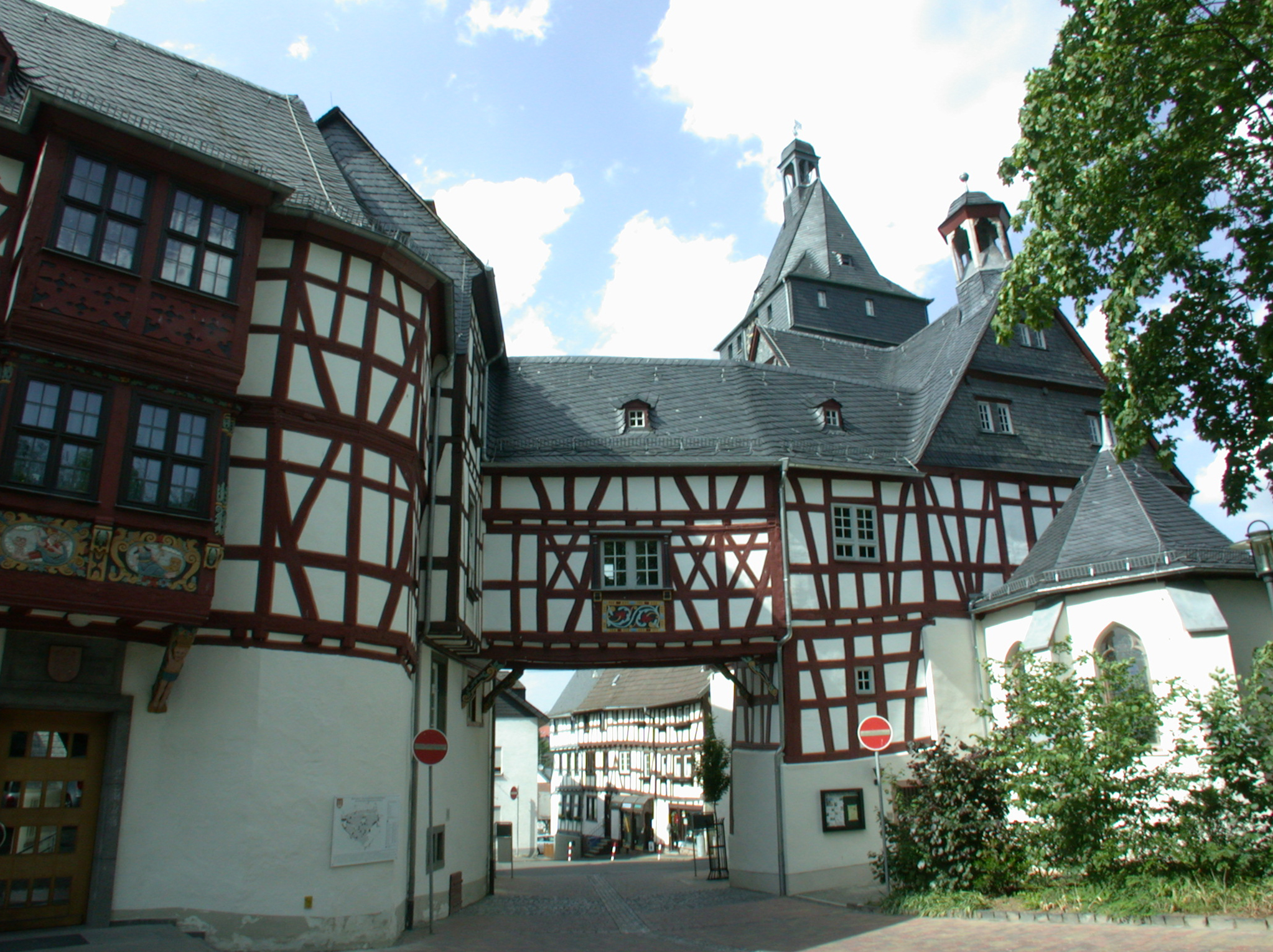
Southeast façade of the Amthof with the upper tower's cupola in the background and the apse of the Hohenfeldkapelle at the right edge of the picture

To the Linear Pottery culture from the New Stone Age (5000-3000 BC), which draws its name from the ceramics that it produced, belong the oldest archaeological finds in the Camberg area. While most groups at that time were hunter-gatherers, the Linear Pottery people were already producing their own food by raising crops (among others emmer and einkorn wheats) and livestock, the latter being mainly sheep, swine, goats and above all cattle; this covered up to 90% of the people's meat requirements.

It is known how these cultures built houses. The houses were mostly 20 to 25 m long and 5 to 7 m wide, consisting of five rows of posts, the three inner ones bearing the roof's weight, and the two outer ones the wattle-and-daub walls’. These houses served to house people, supplies and animals, and they were always oriented in a certain direction (northwest-southeast or north–south). Within the settlements, irregular pits are encountered that, when houses were being built, were used as the houses’ excavations. They were then filled more and more with rubbish such as charcoal, animal bones, ashes, stones and potsherds. In a few built-up areas in the town's main centre, the streets have cut across several garbage pits. When opening up new cropfields, the farmers preferred loess.

The second wave of settlers has been determined to have come between 600 and 500 BC. The barrow fields on both sides of the road to Tenne (a hamlet) are from this time.

=== Middle Ages ===
On 6 February 1000, Emperor Otto III donated the Cagenberg estate to the Burtscheid Monastery. Cagenberg means Cargo's Mountain, Cargo being a short form of the name Garganhardt. From the name Cagenberg developed Cainburg, Camburg, Kamberg and Camberg, and by other sources Cagenberc (1018), Kamberch (1156), Kahberg (1194) Kamberc (1197) and later Kaynburg. In 1281, King Rudolph I granted town rights on the model of the Imperial city of Frankfurt am Main; these were renewed in 1300, 1336 and 1365.

Legend has it that after Epiphany in 1357, all the Camberg townsfolk were drunk and asleep when robber knights from Walsdorf came to try to rob the town. The town wall had not yet been finished and the knights therefore only needed to cross a hedge. However, there lived some magpies, who noticed the attempted robbery and gave out an alarm call, waking the townsfolk up, who then fended the attack off, putting the Walsdorf knights to flight. To this day, the magpie is still regarded as the town's “unofficial heraldic bird”.

=== Modern times ===
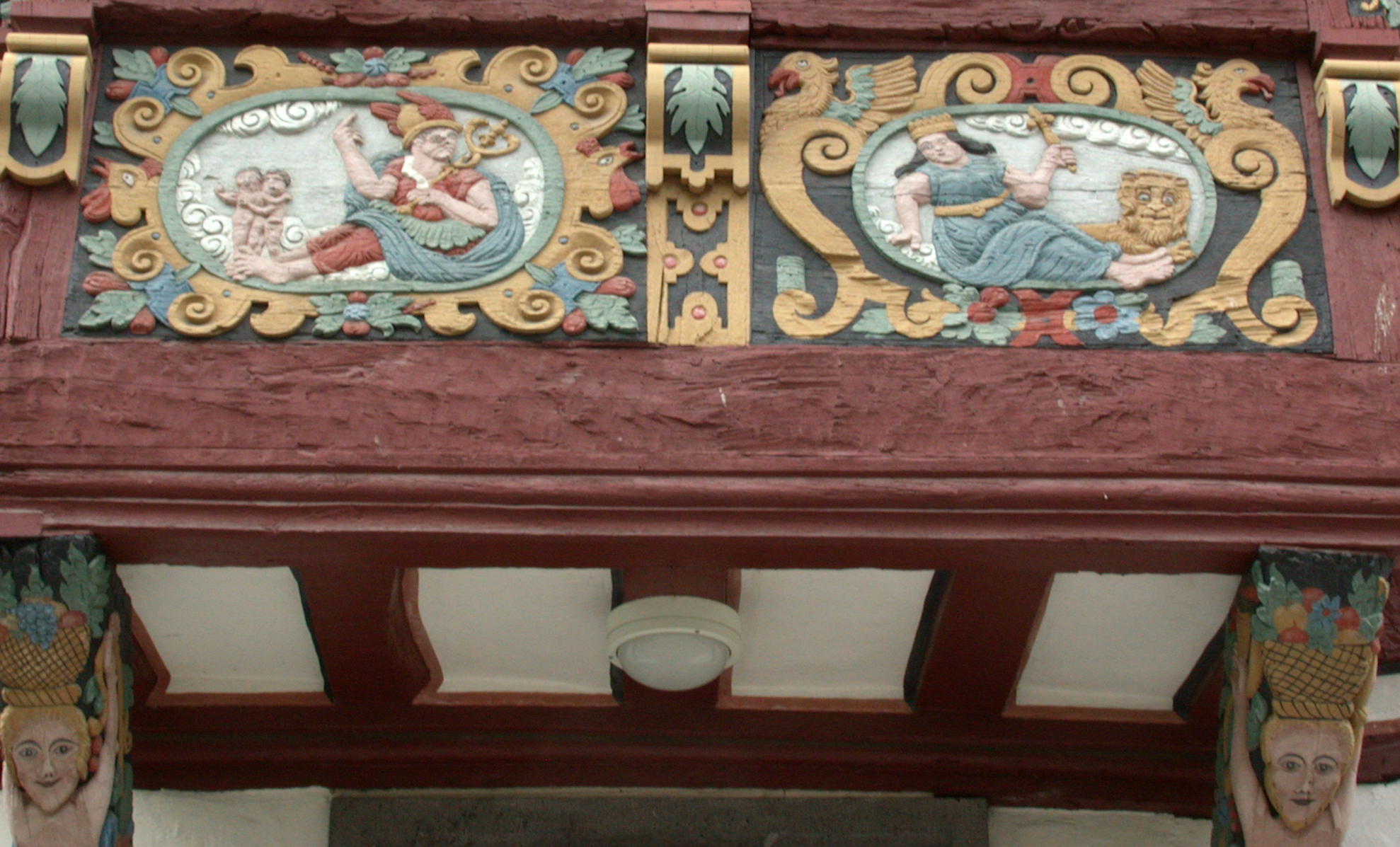
Detail of carving on the Amthof façade

From 1535 to 1794, the Amt of Camberg was in force, to which all current constituent communities belonged under the common administration of the House of Nassau and by the Electorate of Trier. After a short French occupation, the town was, as of 1806, part of the Duchy of Nassau. In 1866 it passed to Prussia. Since 1945, the town has been part of the German Federal state of Hesse.

In 1630 and again in 1659, great witch trials took place. Thirteen women and one man were found guilty and five women were put to death; one also died in custody. The others were released, often after having been tortured.

In 1810, Baron Hugo von Schütz zu Holzhausen, himself born deaf, was first teaching deaf students in rooms at the Amthof, making him a pioneer in this field in Germany. In the years that followed, a scholastic institution grew out of these classes and in 1820 the “Ducal Nassau Deaf-Mute Institute”. Until 1875 it was housed in a side building of the Guttenberger Hof in the Old Town. As of 1894, however, the school had its own building which was built on a plot of land on Frankfurter Straße donated by the town of Camberg. Under the name Freiherr-von-Schütz-Schule, it is still found there today.

In 1861, Moritz Lieber founded a hospital, the Lieber'sches Hospital, on Gisbert-Lieber-Straße. It was dissolved in 1959. Today, the Freiherr-von-Schütz-Schule uses the building.

During the Second World War, and especially in 1944, many Wehrmacht units were in the town. In 1942 alone, eight Jewish inhabitants were deported and murdered.

==== Land ownership in 1788 ====
This table shows how much land was held by each class in 1788 (shown by percentage):

Centre	Townsmen	Nobles	Church
Bad Camberg	70.2	26.2	3.6
Erbach	80.2	18.8	1.0
Würges	65.2	34.8	-
Oberselters	72.4	24.3	3.3
Schwickershausen	83.9	16.1	-
Dombach	96.5	3.5	-

==== Health resort ====
Camberg has been a Kneipp resort since 1927. In 1937 it was granted the title Anerkanntes Heilbad (“Recognized Healing Bath”). Since 1977, Camberg has been a Staatlich Anerkanntes Kneippheilbad (“State-recognized Kneipp Healing Bath”). In 1981, on the occasion of the town's 700-year jubilee of the granting of town rights, Camberg was awarded the official designation Bad (“Bath”, meaning a health resort). Ever since then, the town has been known as Bad Camberg. In 1973, the Hohenfeld Clinics were completed.

=== Amalgamations ===
In the 1970s there was administrative reform throughout Germany, which also had its consequences in the Bad Camberg area. On 13 August 1970, the “Municipal Working Community of the Goldener Grund” came into force. Its goal was to unite the communities of the Goldener Grund through a voluntary merger. Ten communities, today's six constituent communities along with the Selters constituent communities of Niederselters, Eisenbach and Haintchen as well as Hasselbach, now belonging to Weilrod, signed this. On 11 December 1969, the Hessian interior minister announced that suggestions for municipal rearrangements were to be worked out for all communities in the state. This envisaged Camberg, Würges, Erbach, Schwickershausen and Dombach being merged into the Town of Camberg, whereas Oberselters, along with Niederselters, Eisenbach and Haintchen, would form the Community of Selters. The Dombach community representatives were of the opinion, however, that they should keep their village's autonomy until such time as the state chose to force an amalgamation. Also, the Würges community representatives feared that building projects in their village would be shelved and that Camberg would become the town's cultural hub.

In January 1971, the district of Limburg once again suggested the small solution. All the current constituent communities but Oberselters were to form the new Town of Camberg. Also brought into question, however, was whether Oberselters, Hasselbach, Walsdorf and Steinfischbach might be amalgamated with the Town of Camberg. The Oberselters community representatives favoured amalgamation, if it had to happen, with Camberg, whereas Hasselbach inclined towards Weilrod. Walsdorf's and Steinfischbach's people had voted for Idstein and Waldems respectively so that the planned merger at the time agreed with the current town limits. The communities of Camberg, Erbach, Schwickershausen and Oberselters backed this merger, whereas Dombach first wanted to “wait and see”, and Würges wanted no voluntary amalgamation. The Bundesland of Hesse named 31 December 1971 as the latest possible deadline for voluntary amalgamation.

On 9 November 1971 came the signing of a boundary-changing agreement among today's five Camberg constituent communities other than Würges along with Eisenbach and Haintchen to found the new Town of Camberg. This agreement, however, was not recognized by the Hesse government, which demanded that Eisenbach, Haintchen and Oberselters be amalgamated with the community of Niederselters and suggested uniting Camberg with Erbach, Schwickershausen and Dombach. The communities complained before the Hessian Administrative Court (Hessischer Verwaltungsgerichtshof) to get it to uphold the merger of Oberselters, Eisenbach and Haintchen at 1 January 1972 anyway. The government was obliged to allow the amalgamation, but it wanted to revise the plan. There was, however, no actual hearing before the Federal Administrative Court (Bundesverwaltungsgerichtshof) in Kassel and the appellate proceedings were suspended in May 1975.

On 1 July 1974, Camberg, Würges, Erbach, Schwickershausen and Dombach were forcibly merged. The community of Oberselters joined.

=== Overlords ===
From its first documentary mention in 1000, Camberg belonged to the County of Diez, which passed to the County of Nassau-Dillenburg in 1388. In 1420, the Lords of Eppstein inherited half the town, while the other half was kept by Dillenburg. Eight years later, the Lords of Eppstein acquired a further fourth of Camberg. This was bought in 1453 by the Counts of Katzenelnbogen, who a year later also bought a further eighth from Dillenburg, although they sold this back to Dillenburg only a year later. In 1470, Katzenelnbogen passed to Hesse-Marburg and in 1508 Eppstein to the Counts of Königstein. When the Counts of Königstein died out in 1535, the Electorate of Trier occupied Camberg and acquired half the town. In 1557, the Treaty of Frankfurt added the Hessian fourth to Nassau-Dillenburg. From 1607 to 1628, one fourth, which had been Dillenburg domain before this and also was afterwards, belonged to Nassau-Hadamar. In 1652, the Dillenburg half went to Nassau-Diez, and in 1743 to the House of Orange-Nassau.

In 1802, Nassau-Weilburg took over the Electorate of Trier half. In 1806 arose, out of Orange-Nassau, Nassau-Usingen and Nassau-Weilburg, the Duchy of Nassau, thereby ending the town's manifold overlordships. In 1816, the Amt of Camberg was made part of the Amt of Idstein. In 1866 Nassau passed to Prussia, in which it belonged to the province of Hesse-Nassau, the Regierungsbezirk of Wiesbaden and the district of Untertaunuskreis. In 1886 Camberg became part of the new Limburg district. In 1945, the town was assigned to the United States Occupation Zone and thereby to Hesse. The town belonged then to the Regierungsbezirk of Wiesbaden until this was abolished in 1968, whereupon Camberg became part of the Regierungsbezirk of Darmstadt. In 1981, it became part of the Regierungsbezirk of Gießen. Camberg became part of Limburg-Weilburg district in 1974.

== Population ==
=== Religion ===
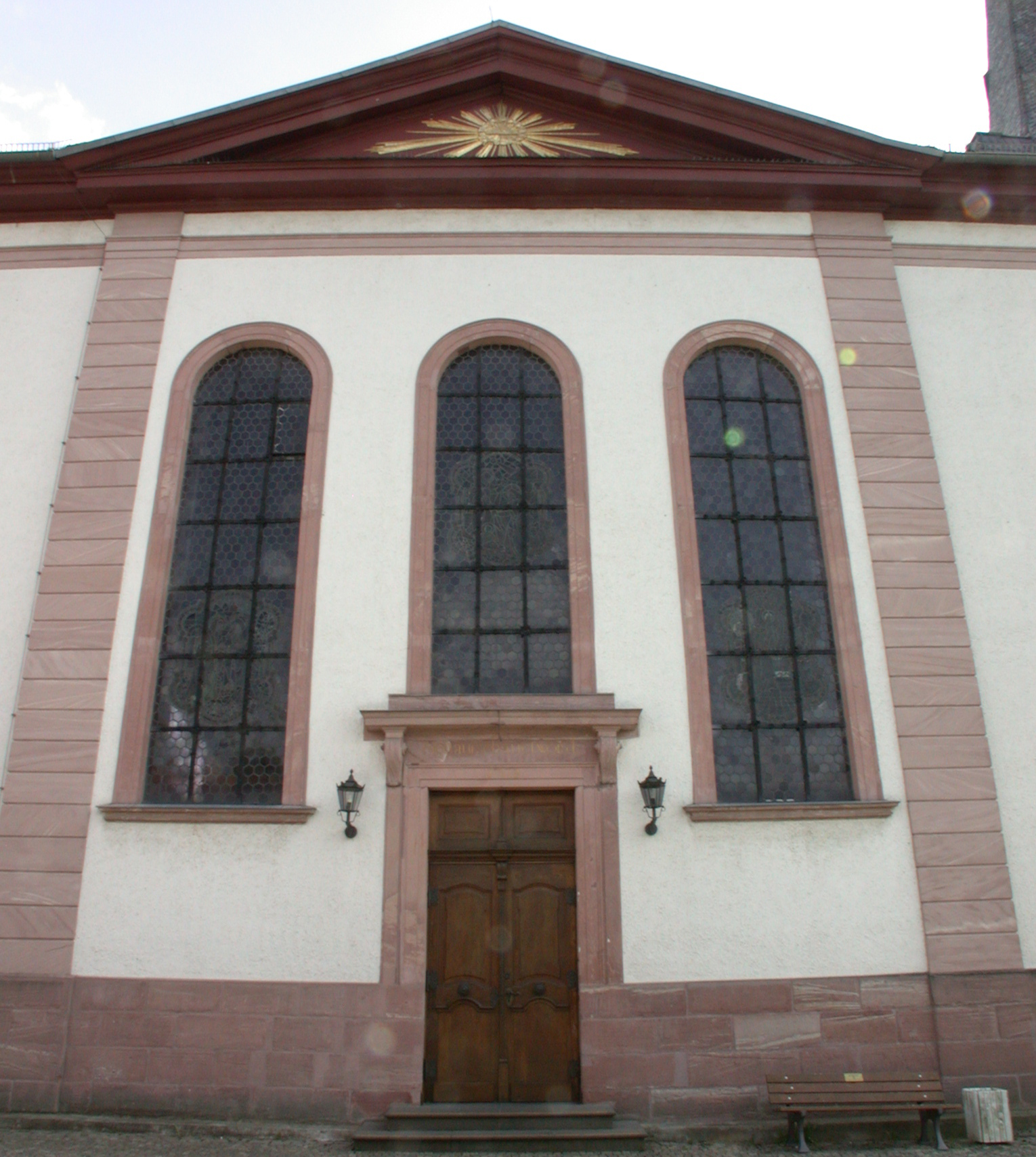
Side portal of St. Peter's and St. Paul's Catholic Parish Church

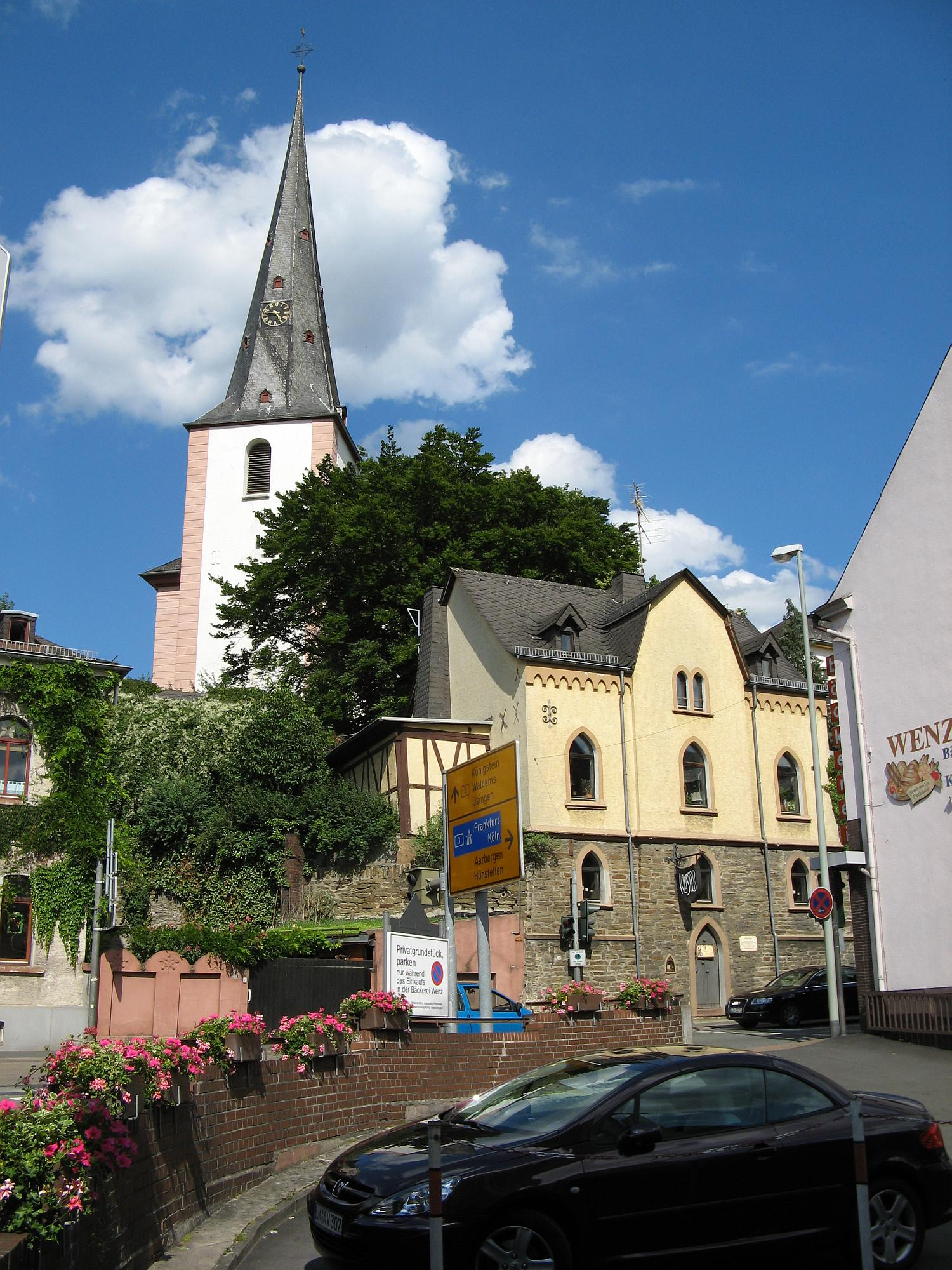
In the foreground, the Klösterchen (“little convent”) of the Arme Dienstmägde Jesu Christi (“Poor Serving Maids of Jesus Christ”) or Dernbacher Schwestern (“Dernbach Sisters”), in the background the steeple at St. Peter's and St. Paul's

All Camberg's centres are mostly Catholic. There are six Catholic parishes that have merged into the Bad Camberg pastoral area: St. Peter und Paul in Camberg, St. Mauritius in Erbach, St. Ferrutius in Würges, St. Antonius in Oberselters, St. Georg in Schwickershausen and St. Wendelin in Dombach. To the parish of St. Peter und Paul belong 3,600 Catholics, and thereby two thirds of the townsfolk. Saint Martin's Evangelical Church (Martinskirche) has been in Camberg since 1890.

=== Population development ===
Year	Population	Foreigners	in %
Dec 1993	13,483	1,070	7.9
Dec 1994	13,576	1,122	8.3
Dec 1995	13,701	1,222	8.9
Dec 1996	13,781	1,235	9.0
Dec 1997	13,884	1,264	9.1
Dec 1998	13,835	1,105	8.0
Dec 1999	13,983	1,082	7.7
Dec 2000	13,982	1,050	7.5
Dec 2001	13,885	1,017	7.3
Dec 2002	13,916	1,017	7.3
Mar 2004	14,103	991	7.0
Dec 2004	14,282		
Mar 2005	14,324	985	6.9
Dec 2005	14,391	1,013	7.0

=== Population development by centre ===
Centre	1910	1970	1974	1987	1998	2004	2005
Bad Camberg (main town)	2,575	4,956	5,247	5,586	6,515	6,800	6,903
Erbach	1,114	2,111	2,257	2,468	2,869	2,805	2,804
Würges	926	2,101	2,185	2,147	2,453	2,530	2,545
Oberselters	587		1,017	1,002	1,221	1,178	1,173
Schwickershausen	332	465	492	536	553	585	585
Dombach	238	225	259	307	366	385	382
whole town	5,772		11,457	12,045	13,977	14,281	14,391

== Politics ==
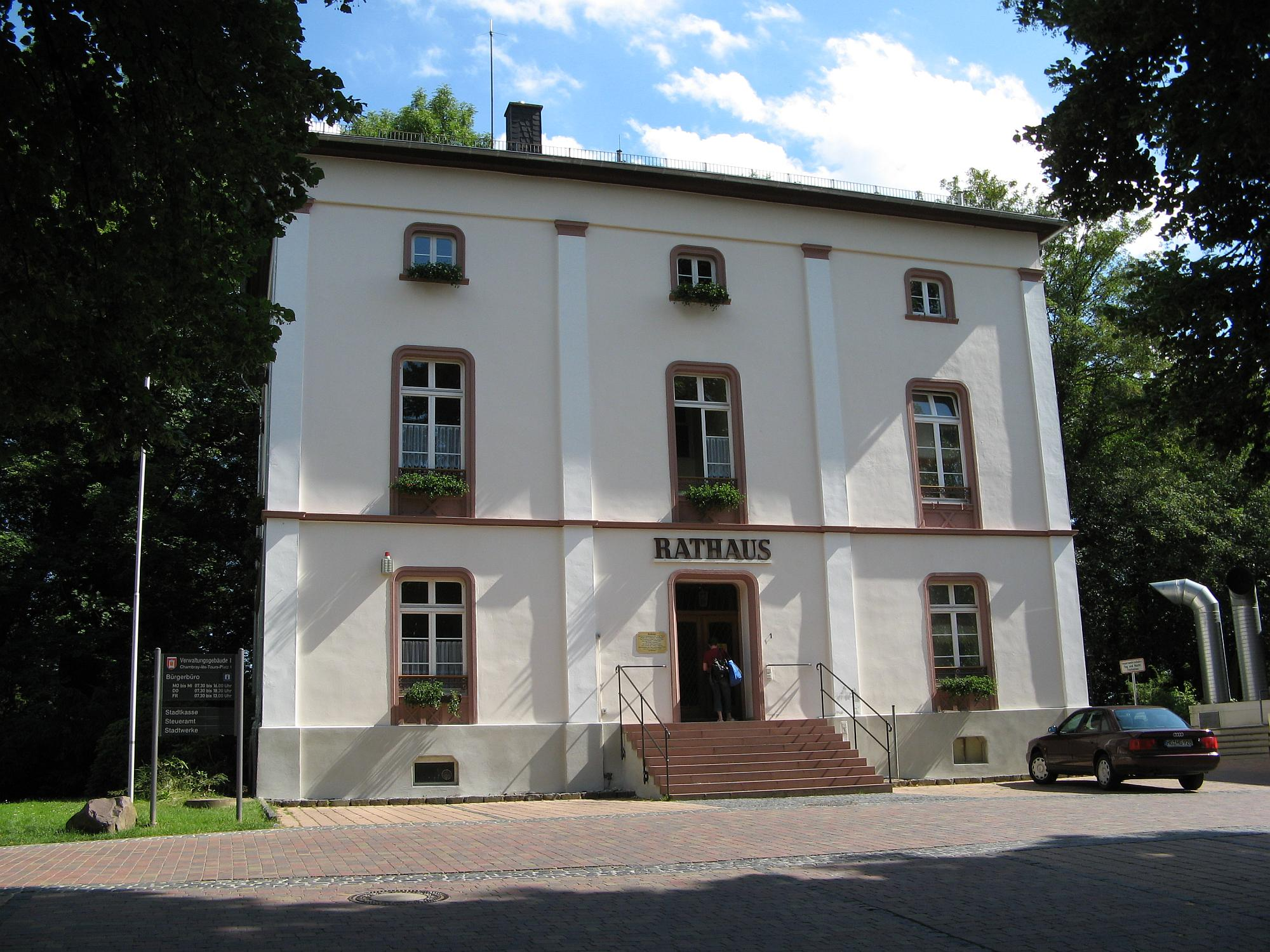
The Town Hall (built 1860)

=== Mayors ===
Mayor	Time in office	Party
Ernst Enzmann	1974–1989	CDU
Gerhard Reitz	1989–2004	SPD
Wolfgang Erk	2005-	SPD

==== 2004/2005 election ====
Percentage results:

Candidate	Party	13 June 2004	27 June 2004	20 February 2005
Wolfgang Erk	SPD	49.1	50.4	63.11
Harald Theuerkauf	CDU	48.6	49.6	36.89
Wolfgang Schiling	none	2.3	-	-

===== Third round =====
These are the results by centre:

Centre	Eligible voters	Valid votes	W. Erk	H. Theuerkauf
Bad Camberg	5,089	2,597	1,686	911
Erbach	2,093	1,146	783	363
Würges	1,952	926	552	374
Oberselters	887	463	273	190
Schwickershausen	458	244	174	70
Dombach	307	179	119	60
Postal vote	769	731	380	351
whole town	11,555	6,286	3,967	2,319

=== Town council ===
The municipal election on 26 March 2006 yielded the following results:

Parties and voter communities		% 2006	Seats; 2006	% 2001	Seats; 2001
CDU	Christian Democratic Union of Germany	47.1	17	47.9	18
SPD	Social Democratic Party of Germany	42.8	16	40.3	15
GRÜNE	Bündnis 90/Die Grünen	7.0	3	8.4	3
FDP	Free Democratic Party	3.0	1	3.4	1
Total		100.0	37	100.0	37
Voter turnout in %		48.2		54.5	

The next municipal election will be held in 2011.

=== Coat of arms ===
The town's arms show the Obertorturm (“Upper Gate Tower”), Camberg's eastern town gate tower, with its gate. On the tower are two golden lions on a red field. The roof is blue. The golden lions on the red field stem from the arms borne by the County of Diez, to which Bad Camberg belonged. The background in the arms is red.

=== Town partnerships ===
Bad Camberg maintains partnership arrangements with the following places:

- Chambray-lès-Tours, Indre-et-Loire, France
- Bad Sulza, Thuringia, Germany.

On 9 January 1991 the town friendship agreement between Bad Sulza and Bad Camberg was ceremonially signed.

== Culture and sightseeing ==
=== Buildings ===
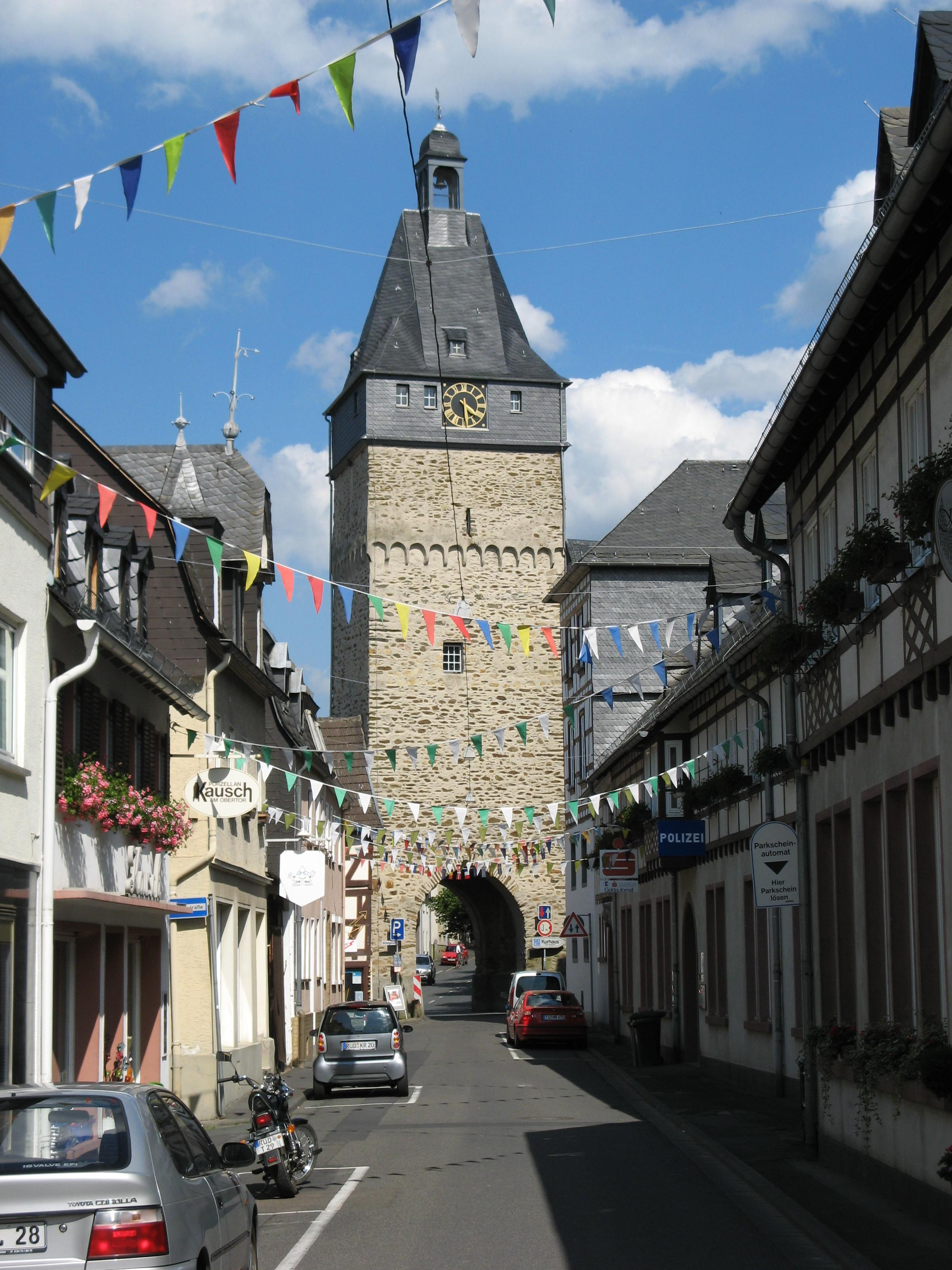
Obertorturm

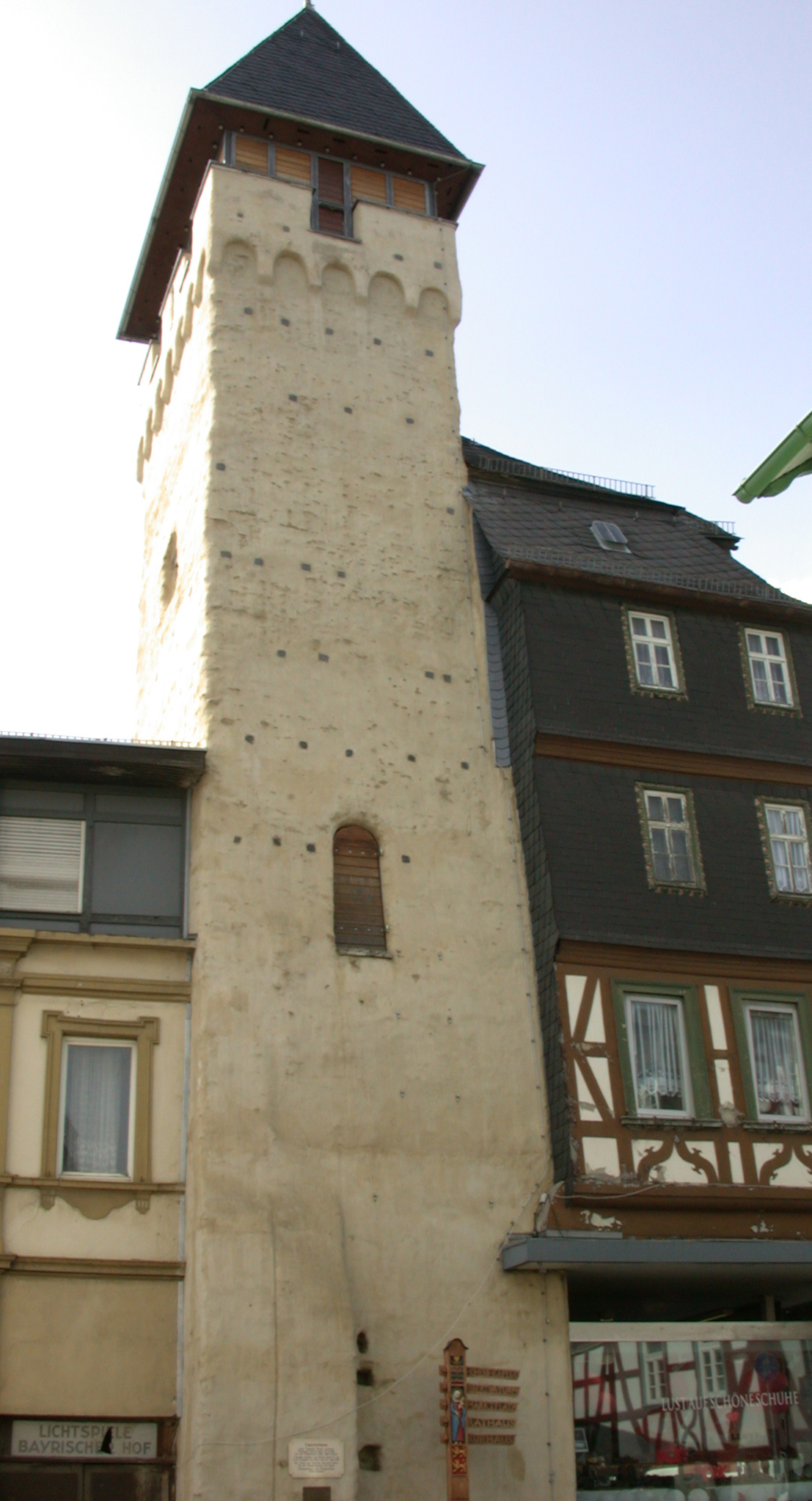
Untertorturm

The Kreuzkapelle is the town's landmark. Today's chapel was built east of the town on a mountain in 1725 and can be seen from far away.

In the Old Town quite a number of timber-frame houses are still to be found, some very elaborately decorated. The houses were mostly built between the 15th and 18th century. Many houses are grouped around the marketplace, which was a trading station on the High Road (Hohe Straße) from Cologne to Frankfurt.

The town's most popular sightseeing spot is the row of timber-frame houses that together make up the Amthof, the seat of the long defunct Amt. It stretches over a frontage of 155 m, making it one of Hesse's biggest timber-frame structures. The representative building was built in 1605 on a former building's foundations. In the years that followed, up until 1669, it was further expanded and the three formerly separate buildings were melded into one great structure.

The Amthof was seat and home to the Oberamtmänner (high Amt officials) of the Amt of Camberg in the Electorate of Trier. Once the Amt was dissolved in 1815, it lost its importance. In 1942 the town acquired the Amthof and had it thoroughly restored in 1989. Today it is the town administration's seat.

Another important timber-frame building is the old Amt apothecary’s shop, whose foundations go back to 1330, and which was newly built in 1492 as a Burgmannenhaus for the Hattsteins. From 1663 the house harboured an apothecary’s shop. Today’s Guttenberger Hof was first mentioned in 1336 as the family von Hattstein’s seat. It was overhauled and built into its current form in 1526. In 1767 ownership passed to the family von Guttenberg and in 1820 to common (that is to say, not noble) ownership. As of October 2007, the Guttenberger Hof is being restored.

Of the town’s old fortifications, only remnants are left. The Obertorturm (32 m tall, built about 1380) and the Untertorturm, the town’s two gate towers, are all that is left of the 13 towers that once girded the town.

Abutting the Amthof is the Obertorturm, likewise one of the town’s landmarks, which also appears in the town’s arms. Right next to it stands the Hohenfeldkapelle (chapel). The chapel is decorated with many fixtures from various centuries, among them plaques with grave inscriptions from the von Metternich und Hohenfeld, von Schütz zu Holzhausen, von Bechtolsheim and von Spies-Büllesheim families, who were of importance in the town. Today, the Obertorturm and the Hohenfeldkapelle serve as the Town and Tower Museum.

The Untertorturm is known locally as the Schiefer Turm von Bad Camberg (“Leaning Tower of Bad Camberg”), a name that owes itself to a lean of 1.44 m over a height of 21 m. On its base once stood three gates in a row. Its old cupola was destroyed in 1945 as the Second World War neared its end.

==== Katholische Kirche St. Peter und Paul ====
St. Peter's and St. Paul's Catholic Church stands in the Old Town's northwest. A “Saint Peter’s Church” (St. Peter Kirche) in Camberg had its first documentary mention in 1156. The oldest part of today's church is the tower built in 1580. After the nave collapsed in the 18th century, a new church had to be built. It was built by the Dillenburg building inspector Johann Friedrich Sckell in the Zopfstil (a late Rococo and early Classicism development), and is therefore one of the few examples of this building style in the region. The Electorate of Trier Auxiliary Bishop Johannes Maria von Herbain consecrated this church on 15 July 1781 in honour of the Apostles Peter and Paul.

==== Evangelische Martinskirche ====
Saint Martin's Evangelical Church and the parish house were built under the Reverend Ernst in 1896–1897. The Wiesbaden government building adviser Eggert developed the plans. The architect L. Hofmann from Herborn took on the leadership of the building work under the royal government's supervision.

=== Kurpark ===
The health resort park (Kurpark) in Bad Camberg was laid out as far back as the 18th century by the family Schütz von Holzhausen. The park lies right at the Upper Gate at the edge of the Old Town. Besides a Kneipp water treading pool, the stand of old trees and the water games, the park also offers a miniature golf course and several tennis courts. In 2002, a herb garden exhibit of about 800 m^{2} was laid out in the health resort park.

=== Regular events ===
==== Autumn market ====
In Bad Camberg the Camberger Kerb, a church consecration festival or kermis, has been being held each year since 1781 at the same time as the autumn market (Herbstmarkt). It is always held on the second weekend in October, although the actual church consecration festival is celebrated on 29 June (St. Peter's and St. Paul's). Since 2004, this has been held under a marquee on the Pfortenwiesen (the old sporting ground). The Kerb is staged by the Verein zur Förderung des Brauchtums Camberger Kerb e. V. and a yearly committee called the Kerbejahrgang.

==== VW veteran rally ====
The Lottermann family's VW-Veteranen-Treffen, known worldwide on the Volkswagen scene, has been a tradition in Bad Camberg since 1979. Every four years, the oldest and rarest automobiles can be found here. The 8th rally was even held a second time, after the founder's death, thanks to the family's support, beginning 22 June 2007.

== Economy and infrastructure ==
=== Businesses ===
In the outlying centre of Oberselters, the springwater business “Oberselters” is located. Here mineral water is bottled under various brand names such as Nassauer Land, Oberselters and Bad Camberger Taunusquelle.

Furthermore, the firm HACA Leitern (ladders), known Europe-wide, has its headquarters in Bad Camberg.

=== Resort business ===
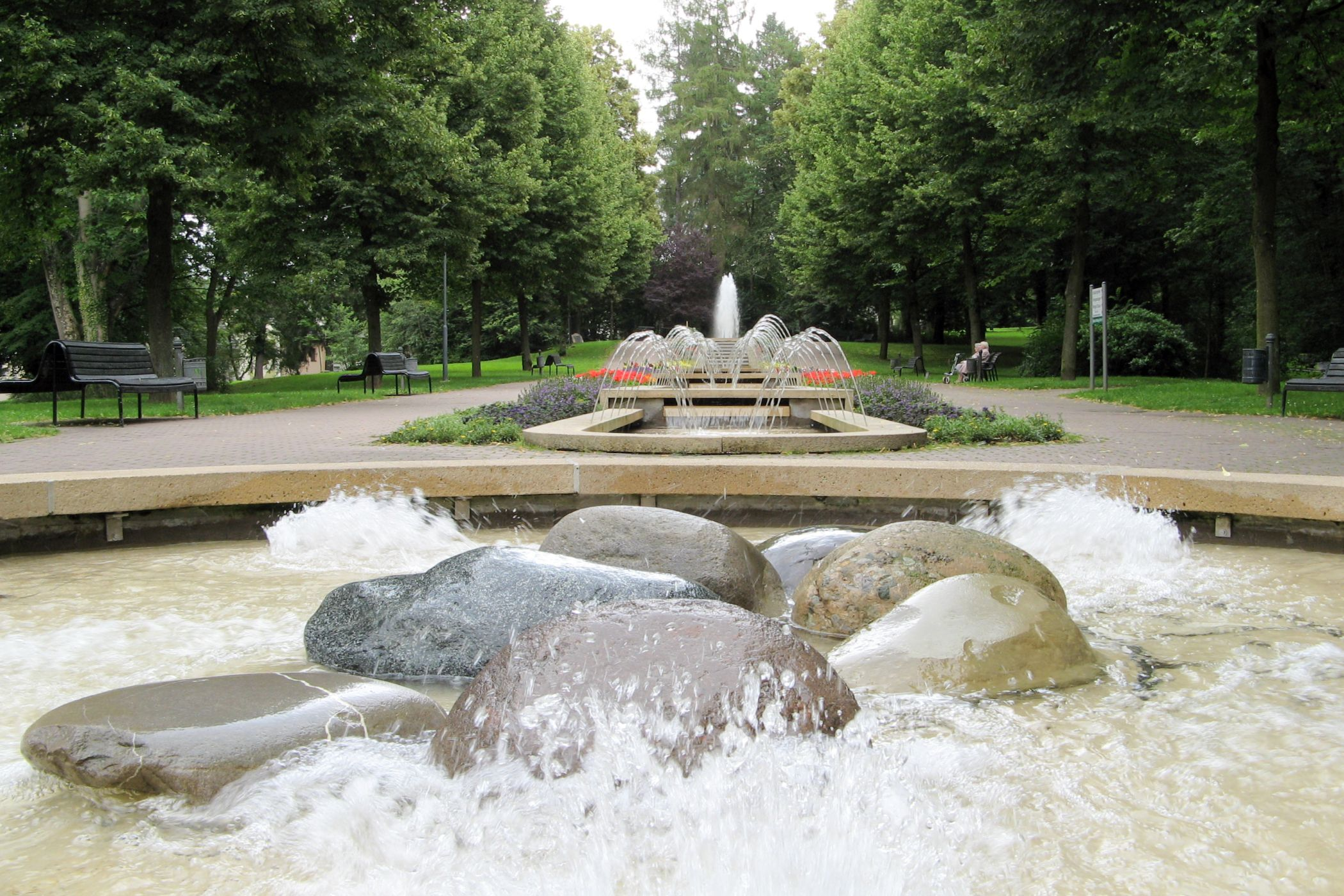
The fountain in the health resort park near the town hall

Health resort offerings comprise the Hohenfeldklinik (psychosomatic medicine: 160 beds, internal medicine: 120 beds, orthopaedics: 87 beds) as a health clinic, a neurological rehabilitation clinic (150 beds), several sanatoria, the Kur-und Gesundheitszentrum (municipal bathing department with gymnastics for the sick) and several Kneipp water treading pools. In 2005, Bad Camberg recorded 176,663 overnight stays by resort guests. The average stay lasted 8.6 days.

=== Transport ===
Bad Camberg lies on the A 3 (Cologne–Frankfurt), which goes back to one of the world's oldest trade roads, and on the Cologne-Frankfurt InterCityExpress line. Many inhabitants from the main town and the outlying centres commute to work in the Frankfurt Rhein-Main Region.

==== Hohe Straße - Autobahn ====
Already in the Bronze Age, which in Germany began about 1750 BC, the Hohe Straße (“High Road”) led through the Ems-Wörs drainage basin, running from Constantinople to Brussels. The feeder road from the town to the High Road was the Limburger Weg (first mentioned in 1355 as Lympurger Weg), whose name was changed in 1959 to Taunusstrasse (English: Taunus Street) and in 1979 to Lahnstraße to avoid confusion with Limburger Straße. By the 18th century, the High Road was no longer used.

In 1934, the town of Camberg joined the company for preparing the Frankfurt-Cologne Autobahn. This Reichsautobahn (now Bundesautobahn 3/Europastraße 35) was built between 1937 and 1939. In the Goldener Grund, its route roughly follows the old High Road's.

Bad Camberg is linked to the Autobahn through the like-named interchange. This interchange was not in the original plans but was built later to let the communities in the Goldener Grund share in the transport and economic development. In 1954, the Bad Camberg-Ost service centre was opened on the Cologne-bound side of the Autobahn; a year later followed Bad Camberg-West on the Frankfurt-bound side.

==== Via Publica - Bundesstraße 8 ====
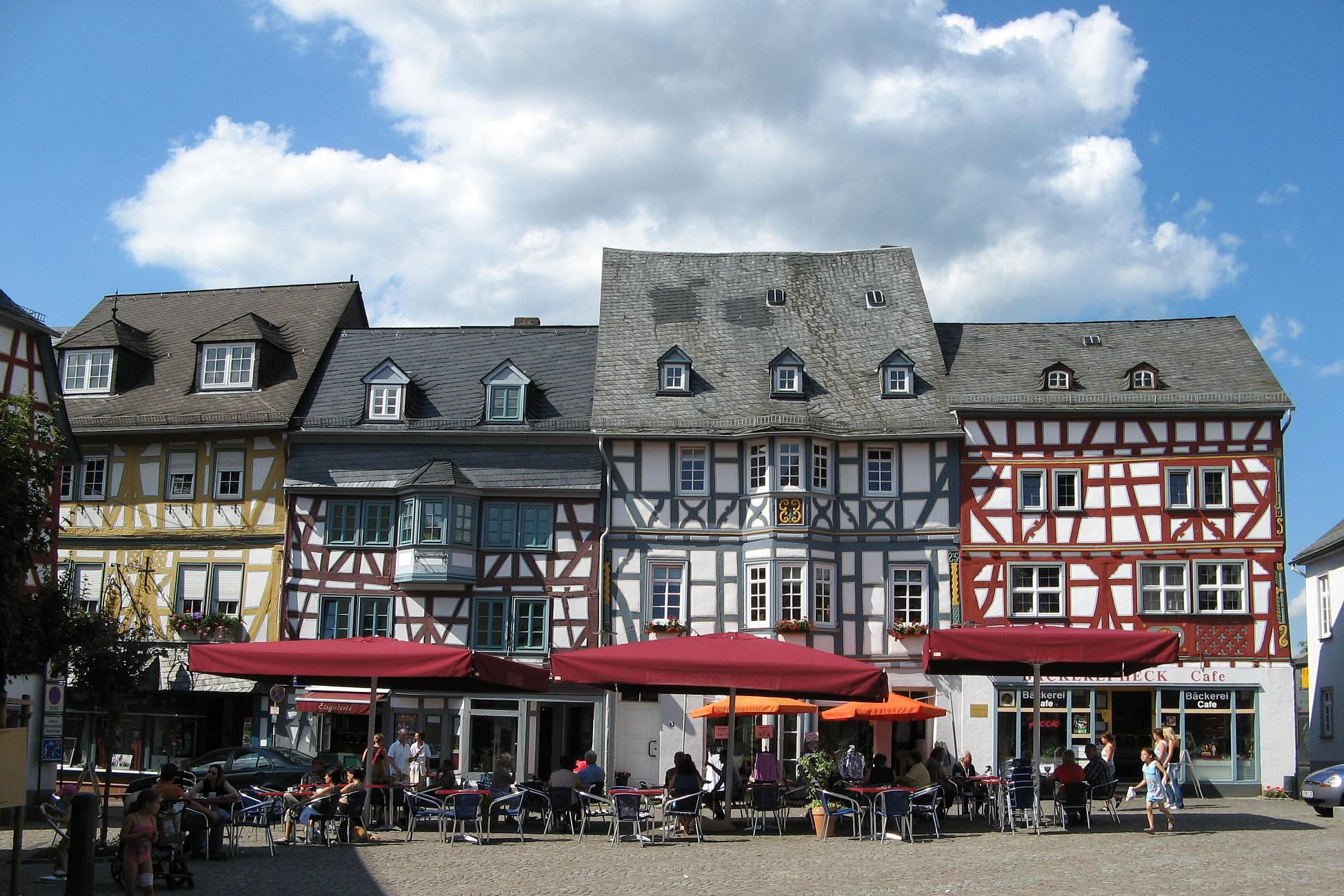
Timber-frame houses with shops on Bad Camberg's marketplace, along which ran the Via Publica.

In the 12th century, bit by bit, roads were also built in the valleys. This was due not only to the upswing in goods trading but also to the growing danger on the High Road. Thus came into being the Emstalstraße (“Ems Valley Road”), a part of the old Via Publica between Brussels and Prague.

In 1768, the Electorate of Trier began expanding highways into boulevardlike roads, and so it also was for the road from Limburg to the border between Würges and Walsdorf, which was finished in 1780. This work on the road, which ran by the Untertortum west of what was then town limits, was after two or three years, owing to the great volume of traffic, once again utterly destroyed. Given this, the town proposed to have the road run from Erbach to the Obertorturm, then through the town to the Untertortum and thence on to Würges. The proposal was, however, turned down. Owing to the Electorate of Trier Road-Building Ordinance of 1753, the citizens of the Amt of Camberg were obliged to perform compulsory labour on the road early in the year and in autumn. Wages and material costs for the bridgebuilding were borne by the Electoral Court Chamber (kurfürstliche Hofkammer), while the communities and the Amt were expected to lay on the materials. Only after the Revolution of 1848 was all compulsory labour abolished.

Out of this road developed the Imperial Long-Distance Road (Reichsfernstraße) 8 in the early 20th century, now Bundesstraße 8, which currently runs through Erbach, Bad Camberg and Würges and by Oberselters. For those first three places, a bypass road has been planned for more than thirty years.

==== Bus and railway ====
In 1876, the Eschhofen-Niederselters railway line was lengthened by roughly 5 km to Bad Camberg. Later, the line was expanded so that through trains can nowadays use the whole Limburg-Bad Camberg-Niedernhausen-Frankfurt/Wiesbaden line. To Frankfurt runs RMV line 20 (Main-Lahn-Bahn), and to Wiesbaden runs line 21 (Ländchesbahn).

Since December 2004, a town bus service has been running in Bad Camberg. There are two routes, LM-31 (railway station-inner town-Erbach) and LM-32 (railway station-inner town-Würges). Each takes a different route from the railway station to the inner town before running to Erbach or Würges.

=== Education ===
In Bad Camberg there are three primary schools, the Regenbogenschule (“Rainbow School”) in Erbach, the Atzelschule in Bad Camberg and the Würges Primary School (Grundschule Würges) in Würges. The Taunusschule Bad Camberg is a comprehensive school at which a finishing certificate (Hauptschulabschluss), a lower secondary certificate (Mittlere Reife) or an Abitur can be earned. The Freiherr-vom-Schütz-Schule, which goes back to 1810 and now includes a boarding school, served seven Hessian districts as a school for the deaf.

=== Kindergartens ===
In Bad Camberg there are six kindergartens, three municipal and three sponsored by the Catholic Church.

== Famous people ==
=== Honorary citizens ===
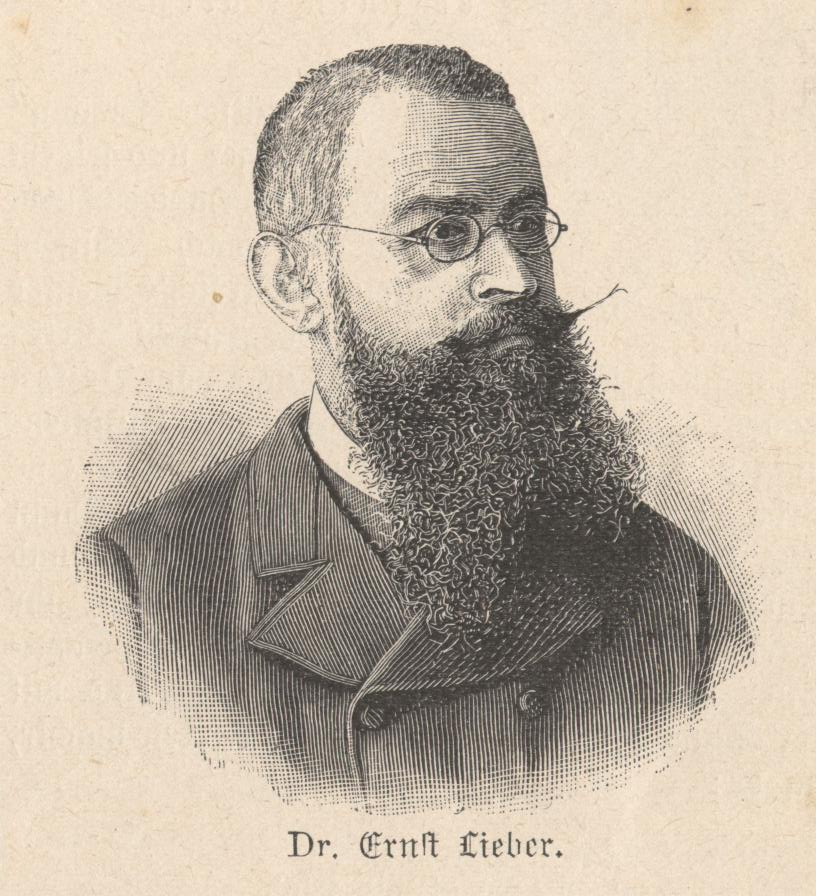
Ernst Maria Lieber 1896

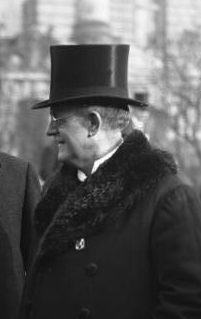
Heinrich Held in 1925

- Moritz Lieber (1790–1860), Gisbert Lieber's son, hospital's endower
- Ernst Maria Lieber (1838–1902), Moritz Lieber's son, Centre politician, Member of the Prussian Landtag and German Reichstag, Cofounder and for a time President of the German Katholikentag
- Heinrich Held (1868–1938) Bavarian politician and Ministerpräsident
