= Ernst Maria Lieber =

German politician (1838–1902)

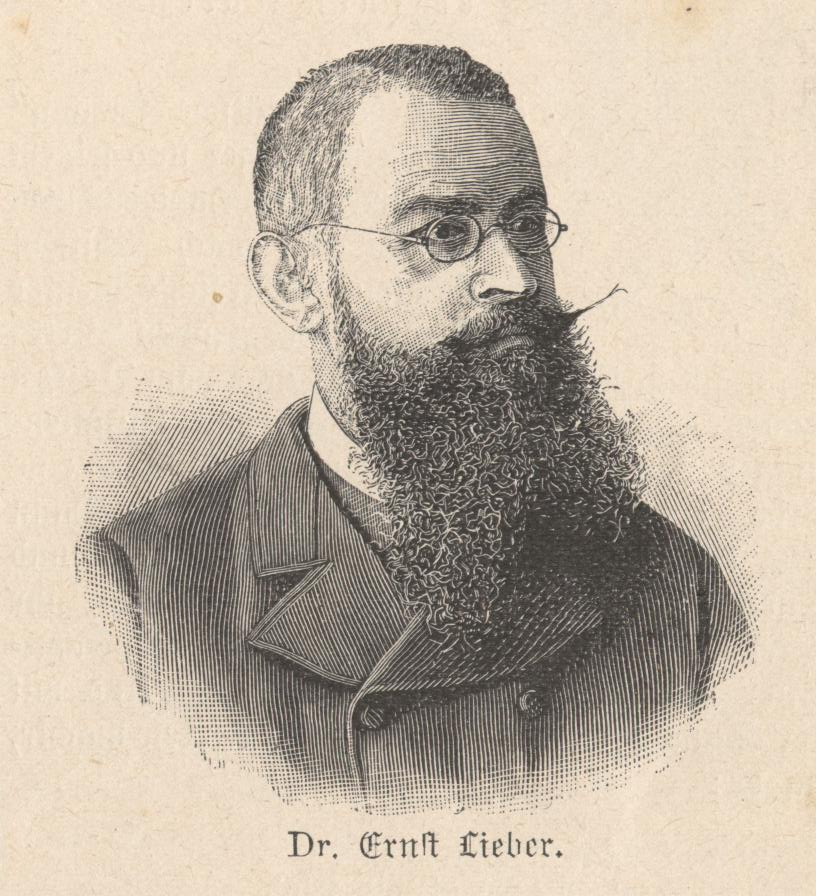
Ernst Maria Lieber.

Philipp Ernst Maria Lieber (16 November 1838, Bad Camberg, Duchy of Nassau – 31 March 1902 (aged 63) Bad Camberg was a German Centre party politician and member of the Reichstag.

== Life ==
Ernst Lieber was the son of the lawyer, politician, and tea merchant Moritz Joseph Josias Lieber. The religious painter Philipp Veit, the Limburg Bishop Peter Joseph Blum and politically influential Bishop of Mainz, Wilhelm Emmanuel von Ketteler, were friends of his parents. Lieber earned his Abitur in Hadamar. He studied from 1858 law in Würzburg, Munich, and Bonn. Lieber received his doctorate finally in Heidelberg. After the death of his father in 1863, he interrupted work on his habilitation and supported his mother in the education of his youngest sibling and the family tea trading business. In Camberg he founded a trade association and a Catholic social club. Lieber married on 24 September 1873 Josephine Arnold (1853–1932). From the marriage twelve children were born. Lieber was a member of the Catholic Student Association KDStV Bavaria Bonn.

== Work ==
At the initiative of Bishop Blum, in 1869 Lieber gave his first speech at a Katholikentag (conference of Catholic laity). Later he became one of the founders of the Centre party, which he took over as chair in 1891 after the death of Ludwig Windthorst. He was elected in 1870 to the Prussian House of Representatives and in March 1871 to the first parliament. Both mandates he held until his death. During the Kulturkampf, he distinguished himself as an eloquent opponent of Bismarck, particularly in the debates on the National Sunday rest, the restriction of women, and child labor, and the general working time limit. Following the partial withdrawal of the Kulturkampf laws, the party under his leadership struck a decidedly a national course. Lieber supported in particular the naval bills, by which he supported the politics of Kaiser Wilhelm II.

Lieber was politically active in his hometown of Camberg. He was a member of the city council and was temporarily City Council Chairman. He also belonged to the district council and district committee, also the local parliament of the governmental district of Wiesbaden, as well as the county council of the Prussian province of Hesse-Nassau in Kassel. In Camberg, Ernst Lieber build in 1889 the Lieber'schen tower on an old foundations, in the tower room he received visitors.

Lieber was elected President of the Katholikentag in Münster in 1885.

== Awards ==
Pope Leo XIII gave him the Grand Commander's Cross of the Order of St. George and made him a papal chamberlain.

This article incorporates information from the German Wikipedia article Ernst Lieber.
