= Moriz Lieber =

Moritz Joseph Josias Lieber (1 October 1790 at the castle of Blankenheim in the Eifel – 29 December 1860 in Bad Camberg, Hesse-Nassau) was a German Catholic politician and publisher. He was a translator of many conservative and Catholic authors into German, including Joseph de Maistre and Thomas More. He was the first president of the "Katholische Verein Deutschlands", which would become the forerunner of the Catholic association, particularly the Centre Party.

His earliest literary activity was the translation of prominent Catholic works from foreign tongues, seeking thus to combat the spirit of the Enlightenment and Rationalism which had been rampant in Germany since the days of Joseph II, Holy Roman Emperor. He first published under the title Die Werke des Grafen Joseph von Maistre (5 vols., Frankfurt-am-Main, 1822–24), the three principal works of de Maistre: Du pape, De l'Eglise gallicane dans son rapport avec le souverain pontife, and Les soirées de Saint-Pétersbourg. He also translated John Milner's The End of Religious Controversy under the title Ziel und Ende religiöser Kontroversen (Frankfurt 1828; new ed., Paderborn, 1849), and Thomas Moore's Travels of an Irish Gentleman in Search of a Religion: Reisen eines Irländers um die wahre Religion zu suchen (Aschaffenburg, 1834; 6th ed, 1852).

In answer to the pamphlet Bruchstück eines Gespräches über die Priesterehe (Hadamar, 1831), in which an anonymous "friend of the clergy and of women" attacked the celibacy of the Catholic priesthood, Lieber wrote Vom Cölibat (Frankfurt, 1831). As a member of the Lower Chamber of Nassau, he published Blick auf die jüngste Session der Landesdeputierten zur Ständeversammlung des Herzogthums Nassau (Frankfurt, 1832). Lieber's name became known, however, throughout Germany by his championship of the Archbishop of Cologne, Clemens August von Droste-Vischering, who had been imprisoned by the Prussian Government. In his defence he issued under the pseudonym of "A Practical Jurist" the polemic, Die Gefangennehmung des Erzbischofs von Köln und ihre Motive (3 parts, Frankfurt, 1837–38).

He was entrusted by the assembly of bishops in Würzburg in 1848 and by the first conference of the bishops of the ecclesiastical Province of the Upper Rhine held in Freiburg in 1851, with the commission to draw up a memorial to the Government. He took a prominent part in the founding of Der Katholische Verein Deutschlands (Catholic Association of Germany). He presided at its sessions held in 1849 in Breslau, and in 1867 in Salzburg, the predecessors of the major Catholic congresses, and as president of the Breslau Congress he drew up the protest of the Katholische Verein Deutschlands against the proposals for reform made by the Freiburg professor, J.B. Hirscher, in his work Erörterungen über die grossen religiösen Fragen der Gegenwart (3 parts, Freiburg im Br., 1846–55). In the conflict between the ecclesiastical Province of the Upper Rhine and the Government, Lieber interposed with a second pamphlet, In Sachen der oberrheinischen Kirchen-provinz (Freiburg im Br., 1853); and, especially in his last years, as a member of the Upper Chamber of Nassau he was an energetic champion of the interests of the Church, for which he also used his personal influence with his duke, who had appointed him counsellor of Legation. His philanthropy is evidenced by his building of a hospital in Camberg, towards the foundation of which his father had left a rich bequest.
