= Katzenelnbogen (Verbandsgemeinde) =

Municipality in Rhineland-Palatinate, Germany

Coordinates: 50.268°N 7.978°E

Katzenelnbogen is a former Verbandsgemeinde ("collective municipality") in the Rhein-Lahn-Kreis, in Rhineland-Palatinate, Germany. Its seat was in Katzenelnbogen. On 1 July 2019, it was merged into the new Verbandsgemeinde Aar-Einrich.

The Verbandsgemeinde Katzenelnbogen consisted of the following Ortsgemeinden ("local municipalities"):

1. Allendorf
2. Berghausen
3. Berndroth
4. Biebrich
5. Bremberg
6. Dörsdorf
7. Ebertshausen
8. Eisighofen
9. Ergeshausen
10. Gutenacker
11. Herold
12. Katzenelnbogen
13. Klingelbach
14. Kördorf
15. Mittelfischbach
16. Niedertiefenbach
17. Oberfischbach
18. Reckenroth
19. Rettert
20. Roth
21. Schönborn
