= Hahnstätten (Verbandsgemeinde) =

Coordinates: 50.300°N 8.067°E

Hahnstätten is a former Verbandsgemeinde ("collective municipality") in the Rhein-Lahn-Kreis, in Rhineland-Palatinate, Germany. Its seat was in Hahnstätten. On 1 July 2019, it was merged into the new Verbandsgemeinde Aar-Einrich.

== Municipalities ==
The Verbandsgemeinde Hahnstätten consisted of the following Ortsgemeinden ("local municipalities"):

1. Burgschwalbach
2. Flacht
3. Hahnstätten
4. Kaltenholzhausen
5. Lohrheim
6. Mudershausen
7. Netzbach
8. Niederneisen
9. Oberneisen
10. Schiesheim
