= Aarbergen =

- Municipality
- Coat of arms

- Location of Aarbergen within Rheingau-Taunus-Kreis district
- Interactive map of Aarbergen
- Location within Germany Location within Hesse
- Coordinates: 50°15′N 8°4′E
- Country: Germany
- State: Hesse
- Admin. region: Darmstadt
- District: Rheingau-Taunus-Kreis
- Subdivisions: 6 districts

Government
  - Mayor (2019–25): Matthias Rudolf

Area
  - Total: 33.97 km^{2} (13.12 sq mi)
- Elevation: 230 m (750 ft)

Population (2025-12-31)
  - Total: 6,220
  - Density: 183/km^{2} (474/sq mi)
- Time zone: UTC+01:00 (CET)
  - Summer (DST): UTC+02:00 (CEST)
- Postal codes: 65326
- Dialling codes: 06120
- Vehicle registration: RÜD
- Website: www.aarbergen.de

Aarbergen (German pronunciation: [ˈaːɐˌbɛʁɡn̩]) is a municipality in the Rheingau-Taunus-Kreis in the Regierungsbezirk of Darmstadt in Hesse, Germany. As of 2022, it had a population of 6,374.

== Geography ==
=== Location ===
Aarbergen lies on the river Aar south of Limburg an der Lahn and between the Taunus ridge and the river Lahn in the Western Hintertaunus ("Farther Taunus").

The community is found in the low mountain landscape in the western Hintertaunus, which is part of the Rhenish Massif (Rhenish Slate Mountains). The heights are characterized by a pronounced peak-and-trough surface relief, parts of which show formations from deep in the ground (kaolin). The surface relief had valleys carved deeply into it in the Quaternary by the Aar and its tributaries. Underground, the rock is formed mainly out of the Rhenish Slate Mountains’ Lower Devonian shale, metamorphic sandstone and quartzite. On top are found, often several metres deep, great layers of periglacial deposits much of which contains carbonate-free to weakly carbonate loess loam. Oligocene shingle (Vallendar facies) overlies the older surface near Kettenbach and Hausen über Aar.

Well known in professional circles are the occurrences of soil erosion (gullies and similar channels) in broad parts of the community which began in historical times. The landscape in the community's municipal area is characterized by the middle Aar valley with its side valleys. The greater part of the municipal area is wooded. The main land use in open areas is field crops. In the valleys is meadowland, sometimes with scenically valuable meadow orchards (Streuobstwiesen). The Aubach, the Aar's biggest tributary, empties into that river within community limits, as does the Bettenbach.

=== Neighbouring communities ===
Aarbergen borders in the north on the communities of Mudershausen, Schiesheim, Burgschwalbach and Kaltenholzhausen (all in the Rhein-Lahn-Kreis in Rhineland-Palatinate) and Hünfelden (Limburg-Weilburg), in the east on the community of Hünstetten, in the south on the community of Heidenrod (all in the Rheingau-Taunus-Kreis) and in the west on the communities of Reckenroth, Eisighofen, Dörsdorf and Berghausen (all in the Rhein-Lahn-Kreis).

=== Constituent communities ===
Aarbergen's Ortsteile are Hausen über Aar, Rückershausen, Kettenbach, Michelbach, Daisbach and Panrod.

== History ==
The constituent community of Rückershausen had its first documentary mention in 879. Until 1326, the village belonged to the domain held by Count Gebhard of the Niederlohngau. Thereafter, first a share of the village and later the whole passed to Nassau. In 1532, Rückershausen was granted market rights.

Hausen über Aar likewise had its first documentary mention in 879, when it belonged to the Niederlohngau and found its way into the ownership of St. Severus's Monastery in Kettenbach, which in the same year was moved to Gemünden in the Westerwald. Later, Hausen über Aar had two lords and as of 1806 belonged to the Duchy of Nassau.

With the consecration of St. Severus's Monastery in 845, the village of Kettenbach was founded by Gebhard, Count of the Lahngau and had its first documentary mention. Some time about 1000, the County of Diez grew out of the Niederlahngau. Over the centuries, Kettenbach had various owners and ended up in 1771 wholly in Nassau's hands.

== Politics ==
=== Community council ===
The municipal election held on 26 March 2006 yielded the following results:

Parties and voter communities		% 2006	Seats; 2006	% 2001	Seats; 2001
CDU	Christian Democratic Union of Germany	41.8	13	34.9	11
SPD	Social Democratic Party of Germany	41.2	13	45.0	14
GREENS	Bündnis 90/Die Grünen	7.9	2	5.9	2
BL	Bürgerliste Aarbergen	9.0	3	14.2	4
Total		100.0	31	100.0	31
Voter turnout in %		58.1		71.7	

=== Mayors ===
Past mayoral contests yielded the following results:

Year	Candidates	Party	% Result
2007	Udo Scheliga	CDU	50.5
2007	Hartmut Bopp	SPD	49.5
Voter turnout in %		69.7	
2001^{(1)}	Hartmut Bopp	SPD	50.9
2001^{(1)}	Rolf-Dieter Finkler	CDU	49.1
Voter turnout in %		71.1	

Year	Candidates	Party	% Result
2001	Hartmut Bopp	SPD	38.9
2001	Monika Baumgartl	BL	22.3
2001	Rolf-Dieter Finkler	CDU	38.8
Voter turnout in %		65.6	
1995	Wolf Schrader	SPD	74.2
1995	Rolf-Dieter Finkler	CDU	25.8
Voter turnout in %		77.9	

^{(1)}Runoff

At the last election on 11 March 2007, Udo Scheligo (CDU) edged in with 50.5% of the vote over the incumbent mayor Hartmut Bopp (SPD), who garnered 49.5% of the vote. Other parties nominated no candidates, and also, no independent candidates stood. Voter turnout was 69.7%.

== Culture and sightseeing ==
=== Buildings ===
==== Kettenbach ====
- Evangelical church from 1752. The Baroque organ, called the Schölerorgel from 1763 is under monumental protection; its last major overhaul was in 1969–1970.

==== Michelbach ====
- Fortress church at the graveyard, about 800 years old (mediaeval quire tower, rib vaulting, eight-sided cupola, round quire arch). Today, Aarbergen's oldest building is used as a mortuary chapel.
- Evangelical church from the late Gründerzeit (1908)
- 450-year-old lime tree under conservation protection at the graveyard (Apostellinde)
- Rahnstätter Hof (former estate), well with restored walls with a plaque on which a summarized history can be read, below the glider field (first mentioned in 1194–98, in 1870 the estate was made public at dissolution)

==== Rückershausen ====
- Evangelical church built about 1326, converted in the 18th century, organ from 1755
- Antonius-Sprudel, known since 1779, carbonic acid sparkling sour mineral water (Säuerling), drinking and healing water (gout, diabetes, gastritis and enteritis, kidney flushing, metabolic disorders)

==== Hausen über Aar ====
- Picturesque bridge on the Aar built out of broken stone and with cast iron balustrade from 1866.
- War memorial under monumental protection from 1926 with names of the fallen from both world wars.

==== Panrod ====
- Evangelical church built about 1321 (Late Romanesque quire tower, good Baroque crucifix)

==== Daisbach ====
- Catholic church built 1690-1709 (endowed by the Baron of Galen, hereditary treasurer). The church is used equally by both Catholic and Evangelical Christians.

==== Michelbach, Kettenbach, Hausen über Aar, Rückershausen ====
- Through the community runs the Aartalbahn (railway), which opened in 1894 and is now under monumental protection. It is Hesse's longest building monument and is said to be an outstanding example of an elaborately designed German secondary railway line. In the warmer half of the year there are Draisine trips on these tracks run by the interstate Aarbeitskreis Aartalbahn (“Aar Valley Railway Working Group”, with the first word humorously misspelt – there is usually only one A).

=== Regular events ===
- Each year in the autumn, in every constituent community, the traditional Kerb (kermis or fair), which have mostly been organized by youth for generations. In Michelbach the festival is called Hammelkerb, in Daisbach Klaa Frankfurter Kerb, in Hausen über Aar Häuser Kerb, in Panrod Panröder Kerb and in Kettenbach Schulweihkerb.
- In Rückershausen each year on the last Tuesday in October, the Rückershäuser Markt has been held since 1532. It is one of the oldest festivals in the whole region.
- The Gebirgstrachten-Erhaltungsverein Huiberg Weiß-Blau e.V. (GTEV) stages yearly on the second weekend in June its great Bavarian tent festival in the Michelbacher Brühl (a public ground).
- During the great event Fahr zur Aar, the Aarstraße (Bundesstraße 54) from Taunusstein to Diez is closed every summer to car traffic.
- Michelbach Christmas Market, yearly on the second day in Advent. Since 2006, it has been held in the Brühl (formerly on the main street).
- Each year the Moto-Cross Hessencup in Aarbergen-Kettenbach is held at the Michelbacher Hütte.

=== Culinary specialities ===
- Rückershausen apple wine specialities from the Geier winery.
- Kettenbach brandy from the Höhler distillery.

== Famous people ==
=== Honorary citizens ===
- Wolf Schrader, former mayor.
- Karl Löhr (late), local historian.

=== Sons and daughters of the town ===
- Adolph Samuel Passavant (1841–1926), industrialist (founder of the Passavant Works).
- Wilhelm Passavant (7 April 1886 – 31 March 1959), industrialist.
- Melchior Christian (from 1564 to 1595 clergyman in Michelbach), a pupil of the important Wittenberg reformer Philipp Melanchthon.

== Education ==
- Astrid-Lindgren-Schule (primary school in Kettenbach).
- Aartalschule Aarbergen (coöperative comprehensive school in Aarbergen-Michelbach)
- Freie Schule Untertaunus (Aarbergen-Kettenbach)
