= Heidenrod =

- Municipality
- Coat of arms

- Location of Heidenrod within Rheingau-Taunus-Kreis district
- Interactive map of Heidenrod
- Location within Germany Location within Hesse
- Coordinates: 50°12′36″N 07°59′24″E
- Country: Germany
- State: Hesse
- Admin. region: Darmstadt
- District: Rheingau-Taunus-Kreis

Government
  - Mayor (2019–25): Volker Diefenbach (SPD)

Area
  - Total: 95.94 km^{2} (37.04 sq mi)
- Elevation: 361 m (1,184 ft)

Population (2025-12-31)
  - Total: 7,365
  - Density: 76.77/km^{2} (198.8/sq mi)
- Time zone: UTC+01:00 (CET)
  - Summer (DST): UTC+02:00 (CEST)
- Postal codes: 65321
- Dialling codes: 06120, 06124, 06772, 06775
- Vehicle registration: RÜD
- Website: www.heidenrod.de

Heidenrod is a municipality in the Rheingau-Taunus-Kreis in the Regierungsbezirk of Darmstadt in Hesse, Germany. Seat of municipal administration is to be found in the most populated municipal district, in Laufenselden.

== Geography ==
=== Location ===
Heidenrod lies in the western Taunus north of the main ridge and west of the Aar, between Koblenz and Wiesbaden, roughly halfway between the Rhine and the Lahn. The municipal area stretches east and west of the high ridge along which runs Bundesstraße 260, also known as the Bäderstraße (“Bath Road”). The two highest settlements in the western Taunus, Kemel (village centre, 510 m above sea level) and Mappershain (village centre, 500 m above sea level) are Heidenrod municipal districts. The Mappershainer Kopf, some 500 m northwest of its namesake place, is at 548 m above sea level the highest mountain in the Western Hintertaunus ("Farther Taunus").

Within municipal limits, west of the municipal district of Kemel, rise the headwaters of the Wisper, which run together between the constituent communities of Wisper and Geroldstein. In the constituent community of Mappershain rises the Dörsbach. Some 60% of the municipal area is wooded.

=== Neighbouring communities ===
Heidenrod borders in the north on the municipalities of Holzhausen an der Haide, Rettert, Berndroth, Dörsdorf, Eisighofen and Reckenroth (all in the Rhein-Lahn-Kreis in Rhineland-Palatinate), in the northeast on the municipality of Aarbergen, in the east on the municipality of Hohenstein, in the southeast on the town of Bad Schwalbach, in the southwest on the town of Oestrich-Winkel, and in the west on the town of Lorch and the municipalities of Welterod, Strüth, Weidenbach, Diethardt and Nastätten (all in the Rhein-Lahn-Kreis).

=== Constituent communities ===
Heidenrod's 19 Ortsteile, with population figures as of Nov 2012, are Algenroth (77), Dickschied (473), Egenroth (172), Geroldstein (91), Grebenroth (346), Hilgenroth (103), Huppert (525), Kemel (1219), Langschied (238), Laufenselden (1894), Mappershain (246), Martenroth (67), Nauroth (582), Niedermeilingen (328), Obermeilingen (93), Springen (406), Watzelhain (362), Wisper (94) and Zorn (447).

== History ==
In 1972, the first merger took place when 17 self-governing municipalities amalgamated. Last but not least in 1977 Hilgenroth became part of Heidenrod by law.

== Politics ==
=== Municipal council ===
The municipal election held on 6 March 2016 yielded the following results:

Parties and voter communities		% 2016	Seats; 2016	% 2006	Seats; 2006	% 2001	Seats; 2001
CDU	Christian Democratic Union of Germany	28.4	9	38.5	12	41.2	13
SPD	Social Democratic Party of Germany	38.5	12	35.6	11	41.2	13
GREENS	Bündnis 90/Die Grünen	9.9	3	7.3	2	8.4	2
FDP	Free Democratic Party	4.7	1	4.6	2	5.5	2
BIH	Bürgerinitiative Heidenrod	18.5	6	14.0	4	–	–
DHP	Deutsche Heimat Partei ... Die National-Liberalen	–	–	–	–	3.8	1
Total		100.0	31	100.0	31	100.0	31
Voter turnout in %		59.2		54.7		61.0	

=== Municipal partnerships ===
Heidenrod maintains partnerships with the following places:

- Wissous, Essonne, France
- Mád, Borsod-Abaúj-Zemplén, Hungary
- (Germany) Sollstedt, Thuringia

== Education ==
- Grundschule Kemeler Heide (primary school)
- Fledermausschule (primary school)

== Famous people ==
- Arne Hoffmann (b. 1969 in Wiesbaden), media scientist, journalist and book author, lives in Heidenrod-Springen
- Christian Hock, football trainer for SV Wehen-Wiesbaden
- Sigmund Mannheimer (1835–1909), German-American educator, born in Kemel
