= Aar Valley Railway =

Railway line in Germany

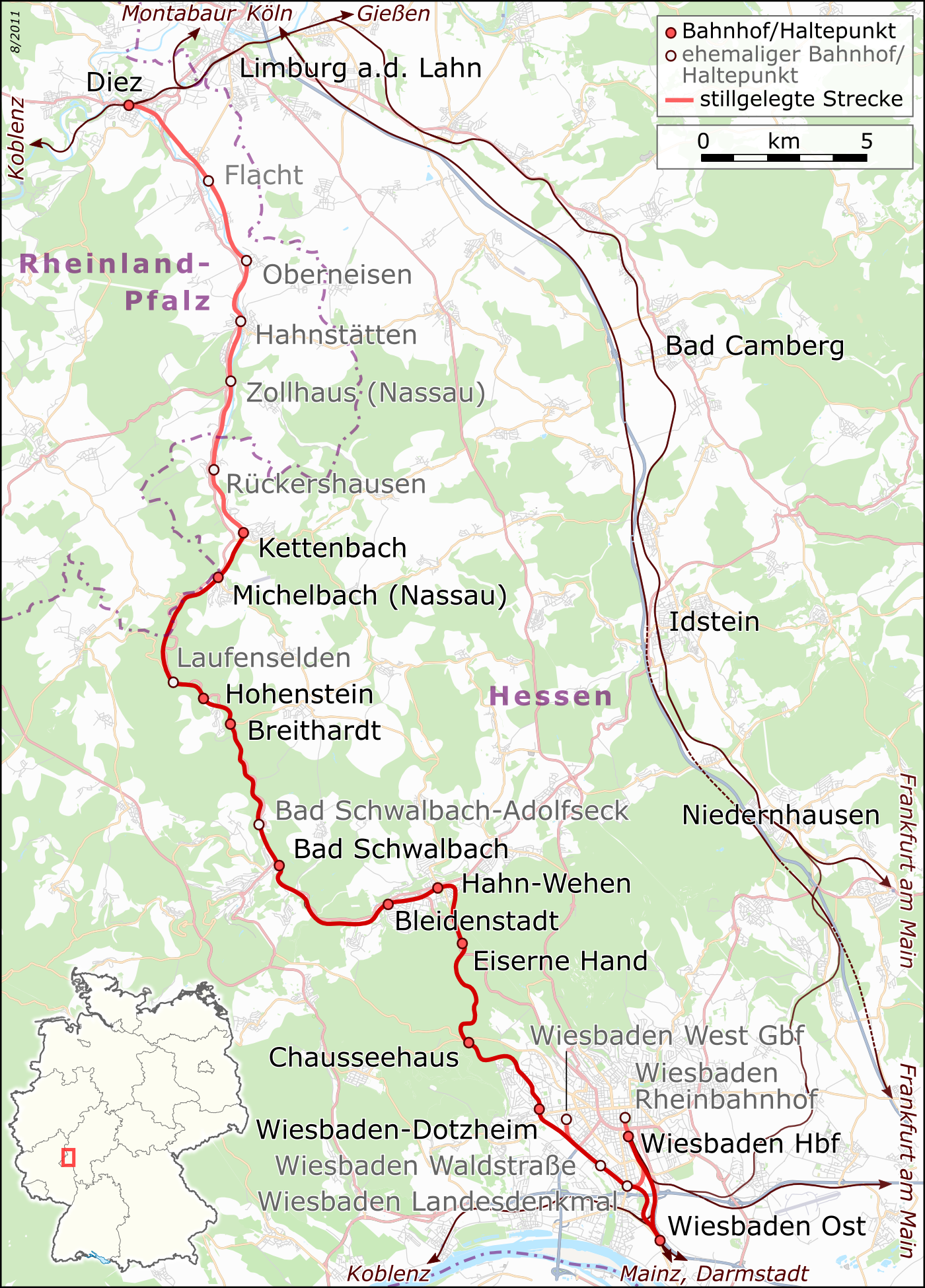
- Route of the Aar Valley Railway

Overview
- Native name: Aartalbahn
- Line number: 3500 (Wiesbaden Aar Valley Railway–Diez); 3504 (Wiesbaden Hbf–Wiesbaden West)
- Locale: Hesse and Rhineland-Palatinate, Germany
- Coordinates: 50°9′38.12″N 8°4′36.44″E
- Termini: Wiesbaden Ost; Diez

Service
- Route number: 12628, until 1986: 548

Technical
- Line length: 53.7 km (33.4 mi)
- Track gauge: 1,435 mm (4 ft 8 1/2 in) standard gauge
- Maximum incline: 3.33%

The Aar Valley Railway (German: Aartalbahn) is a 53.7 km long line between Wiesbaden, the capital of the German state of Hesse, and Diez in Rhineland-Palatinate. From 1985 to 2009, the southern end was operated as a heritage railway with historic trains. The Hessian part of the line is heritage-listed. Currently, two bridges are unusable and several sets of points are defective and need to be repaired. Its northern end is operated with draisines.

== Route ==
The line passes through Taunusstein, Bad Schwalbach (called Langenschwalbach until 1927), Aarbergen and Hahnstätten, which all lie in the Aar valley in the Western Hintertaunus (the lower north-western ridges of the Taunus). The southern part of the Aar Valley Railway runs through Hesse and the section between Diez and Zollhaus lies in Rhineland-Palatinate.

The line formerly connected in Diez with the Lahntal railway between Limburg and Koblenz.

Until 1951, passengers could change in Zollhaus to the narrow-gauge Nassau Light Railway (Nassauische Kleinbahn, NKB), connecting to Sankt Goarshausen and Braubach on the Rhine.

Connections existed in Wiesbaden to trains towards Darmstadt and Aschaffenburg, Mainz, Koblenz, Niedernhausen and Frankfurt.

== History ==
After the annexation of the Duchy of Nassau by the Kingdom of Prussia in 1866, the Prussian state railways considered build a rail link between Wiesbaden and the Limburg area. Moritz Hilf, who had been technical director of the Nassau State Railway since 1862, was put in charge of building the line across the Taunus ridge and through the Aar valley. The project was implemented in three main phases between 1869/70 and 1894.

On 1 June 1870, the first section was opened between Limburg and Zollhaus. This section was mainly used for the transport of minerals, which were obtained in the Zollhaus area (iron ore, limestone, marble and porphyry). The line, which today is largely in the area of the municipalities of Hahnstätten and Diez, follows the relatively wide and flat Aar valley. Built as a mainline railway, the section was designed with curves with a large radius of 300 m for a top speed of 80 km/h; it was reclassified as a secondary or local railway on 19 April 1881.

On 15 November 1889, the section between the Wiesbaden Rhine station (Wiesbaden Rheinbahnhof) and the spa of Langenschwalbach was opened. This had to climb the main ridge of the Taunus between the valleys of the Aar and the Rhine. The line passes through a gap in the main range known as the Eiserne Hand (iron hand); Eiserne Hand station is the highest station on the line. The section between Chausseehaus station and the apex of the line when it opened had a grade of 1 in 30, making it the steepest section of line without rack in Imperial Germany. This section of the route had curves with a very tight curve radius of 180 m, allowing a top speed of 40 km/h. This meant that the construction of expensive and elaborate tunnels and bridges could be avoided. It was not until 1907–1911 that the minimum curve radius was increased to 200 m and the maximum speed at these curves was increased to 50 km/h.

In 1894, the third phase of construction the gap between Langenschwalbach and Zollhaus was completed. This was done mainly at the behest of the industrialist family of Passavant in Kettenbach, which operated the Michelbach steel works. Since the Aar here runs through a gorge and is sinuous, four tunnels had to be built to shorten the loops of the Aar. This section had curves with a minimum radius of 250 m, which allowed a top speed of 60 km/h.

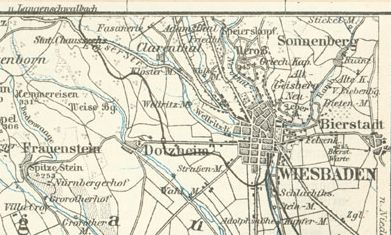
Lines in Wiesbaden in 1890

The line in Wiesbaden left from the Rhine station in a tight arc to the west (Niederwaldstraße and Aßmannshäuser Straße (streets) are on the former course of the line) and then parallel to Dotzheimer Straße to Dotzheim station. The line had to be realigned to connect to the new Central Station (Hauptbahnhof), opened in 1906, and Wiesbaden West freight yard. The new line was inaugurated on 2 May 1904 and ran through the stations of Landesdenkmal (opened 1907) and Waldstraße (opened 1905). On 28 November 1904, the West Wiesbaden freight yard on was opened on the new line. An important link for freight on the line, the Bahnhof (station) curve (at the station now called Wiesbaden Ost) was opened to traffic on 1 October 1906.

In 1986, passenger services were resumed as heritage services of the Nassauische Touristik-Bahn (Nassau Tourist Railway, NTB), which is based in Dotzheim station. A year later, the buildings and technical facilities of the line and stations were classified as a historical monument in anticipation of its closure. Some of the station buildings were sold, but the line was largely left in a state of disrepair.

Operating life of individual sections
Section	Opening	Passengers	Freight traffic	Reactivation
Diez – Zollhaus	1 June 1870	Until 28 September 1986	Until 1 June 1999	From 2015 stadtbahn
Zollhaus – Kettenbach	1 May 1894	Until 28 September 1986	Until 1 June 1999	
Kettenbach – Hohenstein	1 May 1894	Until 28 September 1986	Until 1 December 1992	
Hohenstein – Bad Schwalbach	1 May 1894	Until 28 September 1986	Until 28 December 1990	29 April 1994
Bad Schwalbach – Hahn-Wehen	15 November 1889	Until 25 September 1983	Until 24 September 1983	28 March 1991
Hahn-Wehen – Wiesbaden-Dotzheim	15 November 1889	Until 25 September 1983	Until 24 September 1983	28 December 1985
Wi-Dotzheim – Wiesbaden Hbf; Until 14 Nov 1906 to Rheinbahnhof	15 November 1889	Until 25 September 1983		
Wi-Dotzheim – Wiesbaden Ost	1 October 1906		Until 24 September 1983	2007 to Henkell siding
Since May 2004: operation with draisines between Freiendiez and Michelbach Tunnel

== Operations ==
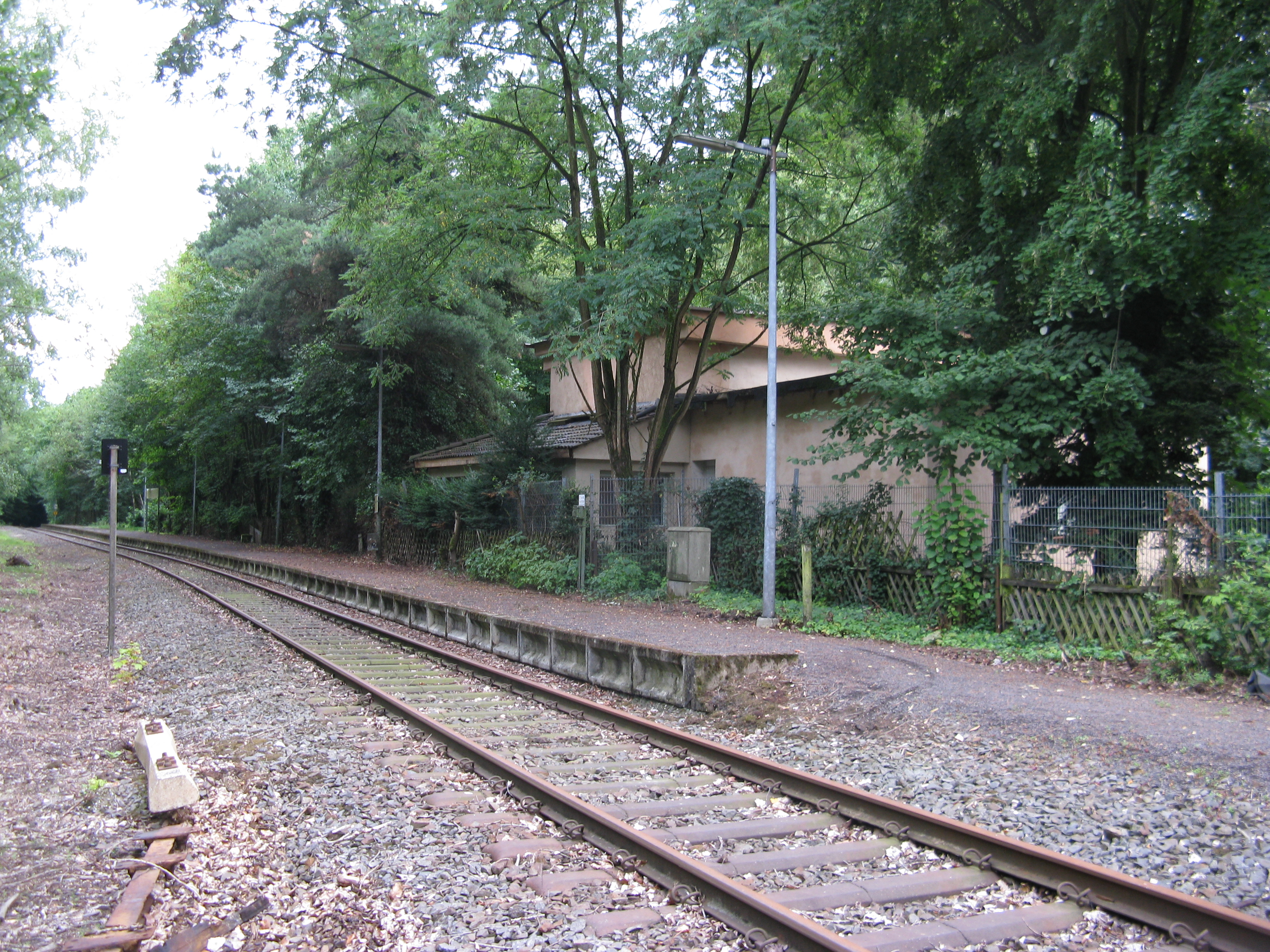
Steel sleepers in Chausseehaus station

The track is single track throughout and is not electrified. Stations where trains can pass each other are at Dotzheim, Hahn-Wehen, Bad Schwalbach, Hohenstein, Kettenbach and Zollhaus. The track is in large part supported by steel sleepers.

=== Passengers ===
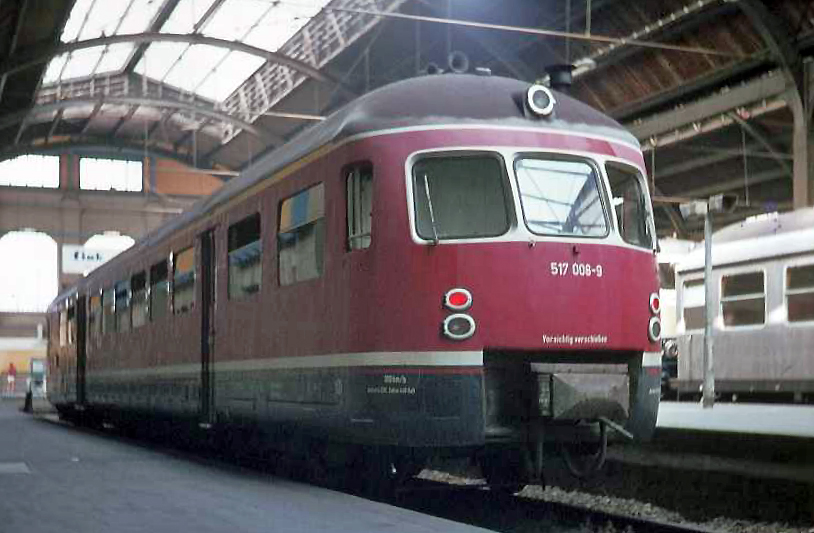
"Limburg cigar" in Wiesbaden Central Station

The southern section—known as the Langenschwalbacher Bahn (Langenschwalbach Railway)—was used in the Wilhelmine era especially for spa traffic between the world-famous spa of Wiesbaden and the women's spa of Langenschwalbach. Between them in Chausseehaus was a summer resort with hotel, restaurant and several rest homes. The steep and winding line through the Eiserne Hand gap required the development of a short carriages with bogies, which was known as a Langenschwalbacher. In 1892, the Langenschwalbach variant of the class T 9 tender locomotive was put into operation, since the slope was found to be too steep for the Prussian T 3 locomotives that were used originally.

After the First World War, the Aar Valley Railway crossed at Laufenselden the Free State Bottleneck (Freistaat Flaschenhals), a strip of land between the American bridgehead of Koblenz and the French bridgehead at Mainz.

After the Second World War, the line was cut between Zollhaus and Kettenbach by the border between the American and French occupation zone. Special passes were required to travel on the trains. Later this became the border between Hesse and Rhineland-Palatinate. From the 1960s on, this line was mainly served by accumulator railcars of class 517, known as Limburger Zigarre (Limburg cigars). In addition, the line was served by Silberling carriages, hauled by class 216 diesel locomotives. On 25 September 1983, the last scheduled passenger train ran between Wiesbaden and Bad Schwalbach. On 28 September 1986, the remaining northern section of the line was closed to traffic; at the end it was still used by Uerdingen railbuses.

On 28 December 1985, the Nassauische Touristik-Bahn began operating tourist trains, hauled by steam and diesel locomotives. These trains were based in Dotzheim station and originally operated to Hahn-Wehen. From 28 March 1991, was the line was extended to Bad Schwalbach and from 29 April 1994 to Hohenstein. The operation stopped in May 2009 when a bridge was damaged by the collision of a road vehicle and because of several defective sets of points.

=== Freight ===
The Aar railway was used for the transportation of mining products. The Schaefer lime works in Oberneisen and the Michelbach steelworks (Michelbacher Hütte) in Kettenbach are located directly on the line. While freight traffic on the Wiesbaden–Bad Schwalbach line was discontinued at the same time as passenger services on 24 September 1983, freight traffic ran from Diez to Bad Schwalbach until 28 December 1990 and traffic to Hohenstein was closed on 1 December 1992. The last train between Kettenbach and the northern end of the line ran in June 1999.

Since 2007, the operation of traffic was resumed between Wiesbaden Ost station and Henkell & Co. (a sparkling wine manufacturer) at the former Landesdenkmal station.

== Transport associations ==
Between Diez and Zollhaus the line is located in the area of the transport association Verkehrsverbund Rhein-Mosel (VRM) between Rückershausen and Wiesbaden in the area of the transport association Rhein-Main-Verkehrsverbund (RMV), although currently there is no public passenger transport on the whole line.

== Reactivation plans ==
=== Rhineland-Palatinate ===
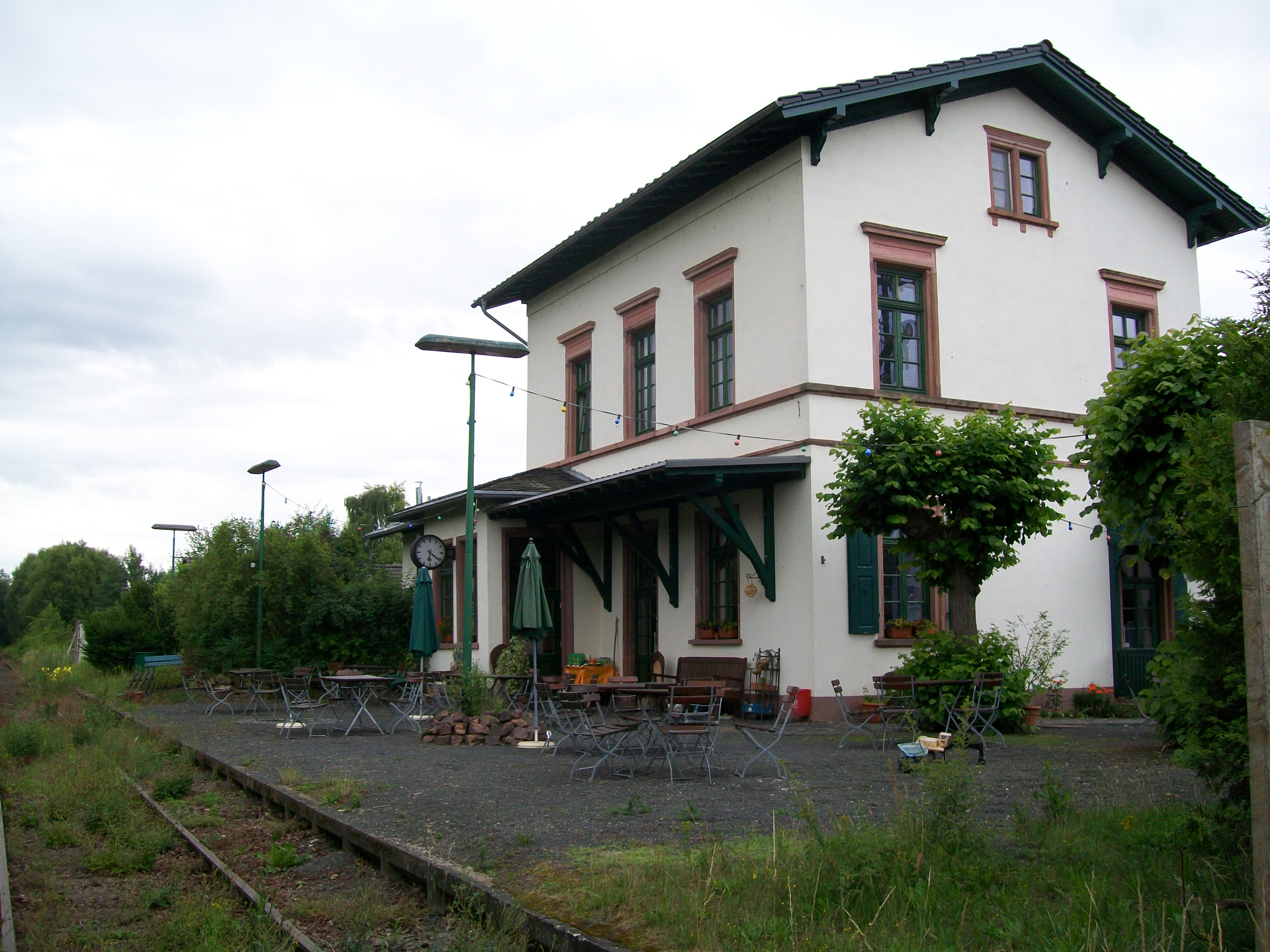
Flacht station (currently a restaurant) is to be reactivated in 2015.

At the end of August 2008, the Zweckverband Schienenpersonennahverkehr Rheinland-Pfalz-Nord (Northern Rhineland-Palatinate Public Transport Association, SPNV-Nord) decided to reactivate the Limburg–Zollhaus section in 2014 with an hourly regional service as part of Rhineland-Palatinate integrated regular interval service (Rheinland-Pfalz-Takt). This would form part of the Rheinland-Pfalz-Takt 2015 concept, which includes the reactivation of disused railway lines. The expected travel time on the 13.7 km long section between Zollhaus and Limburg (including a reversal in Diez) would be 20 minutes and thus only half as long as the existing bus service. A diesel multiple unit would operate a shuttle service on the line. In addition to the reactivation of the existing stations additional stations would be established in Niederneisen, Holzheim and Freiendiez. It was announced in 2011 that the commissioning would be delayed, however, until August 2015. A proposed extension of the reactivated section of line to Michelbach was ruled out for cost reasons, since it would require a second vehicle.

==== Draisine rides ====
The interest group Arbeitskreis Aartalbahn e. V., that has the goal of a reactivation of the Aar Valley Railway for public transport, uses the Aar Valley Railway regularly for drsisine rides between Diez and Michelbach, base of the service is Oberneisen station.

=== Hesse ===
Planned track of Stadtbahn Wiesbaden in blue, existing bus routes in red and the Aar Valley Railway in black running from upper left through Chausseehaus stop towards Wiesbaden-Dotzheim

There have been plans since 1998 to restore and electrify the section of the Aar Valley Railway between Bad Schwalbach and Wiesbaden-Dotzheim as part of a proposed Wiesbaden Stadtbahn and building a new line from Dotzheim through the central city to Wiesbaden Central Station (Hauptbahnhof), including the option of an extension to Mainz. It was proposed to open the new line by 2005. After local elections in 2001, the majority in the Wiesbaden city council abandoned these plans. However, another election in 2011 has changed the balance in the council and plans for a Stadtbahn have been revived, although the proposed initial stage would not connect to the Aar Valley Railway.
