= Braem =

Braem, Braemt, or Braems is a surname. Notable people with the surname include:

- Joseph-Pierre Braemt (1796–1864), Belgian medalist
- Renaat Braem (1910–2001), Belgian architect
- Harald Braem alias Wolfram vom Stein (born 1944), German writer
- Urbain Braems (born 1933), retired Belgian football player and manager

== See also ==
- Bräm
