= Aar-Einrich =

Collective municipality in Germany

- Verbandsgemeinde
- Location of Aar-Einrich within Rhein-Lahn-Kreis district
- Interactive map of Aar-Einrich
- Location within Germany Location within Rhineland-Palatinate
- Coordinates: 50°16′N 7°59′E
- Country: Germany
- State: Rhineland-Palatinate
- District: Rhein-Lahn-Kreis
- Seat: Katzenelnbogen
- Subdivisions: 31 municipalities

Area
  - Total: 160.14 km^{2} (61.83 sq mi)

Population (2025-12-31)
  - Total: 18,729
  - Density: 116.95/km^{2} (302.91/sq mi)
- Time zone: UTC+01:00 (CET)
  - Summer (DST): UTC+02:00 (CEST)
- Website: www.vg-aar-einrich.de

Aar-Einrich is a Verbandsgemeinde ("collective municipality") in the Rhein-Lahn-Kreis, in Rhineland-Palatinate, Germany. Its seat is in Katzenelnbogen. It was formed on 1 July 2019 by the merger of the former Verbandsgemeinden Hahnstätten and Katzenelnbogen. It takes its name from the river Aar and the Einrich hills.

The Verbandsgemeinde Aar-Einrich consists of the following Ortsgemeinden ("local municipalities"):

1. Allendorf
2. Berghausen
3. Berndroth
4. Biebrich
5. Bremberg
6. Burgschwalbach
7. Dörsdorf
8. Ebertshausen
9. Eisighofen
10. Ergeshausen
11. Flacht
12. Gutenacker
13. Hahnstätten
14. Herold
15. Kaltenholzhausen
16. Katzenelnbogen
17. Klingelbach
18. Kördorf
19. Lohrheim
20. Mittelfischbach
21. Mudershausen
22. Netzbach
23. Niederneisen
24. Niedertiefenbach
25. Oberfischbach
26. Oberneisen
27. Reckenroth
28. Rettert
29. Roth
30. Schiesheim
31. Schönborn
