= Aar (Lahn) =

River in Germany

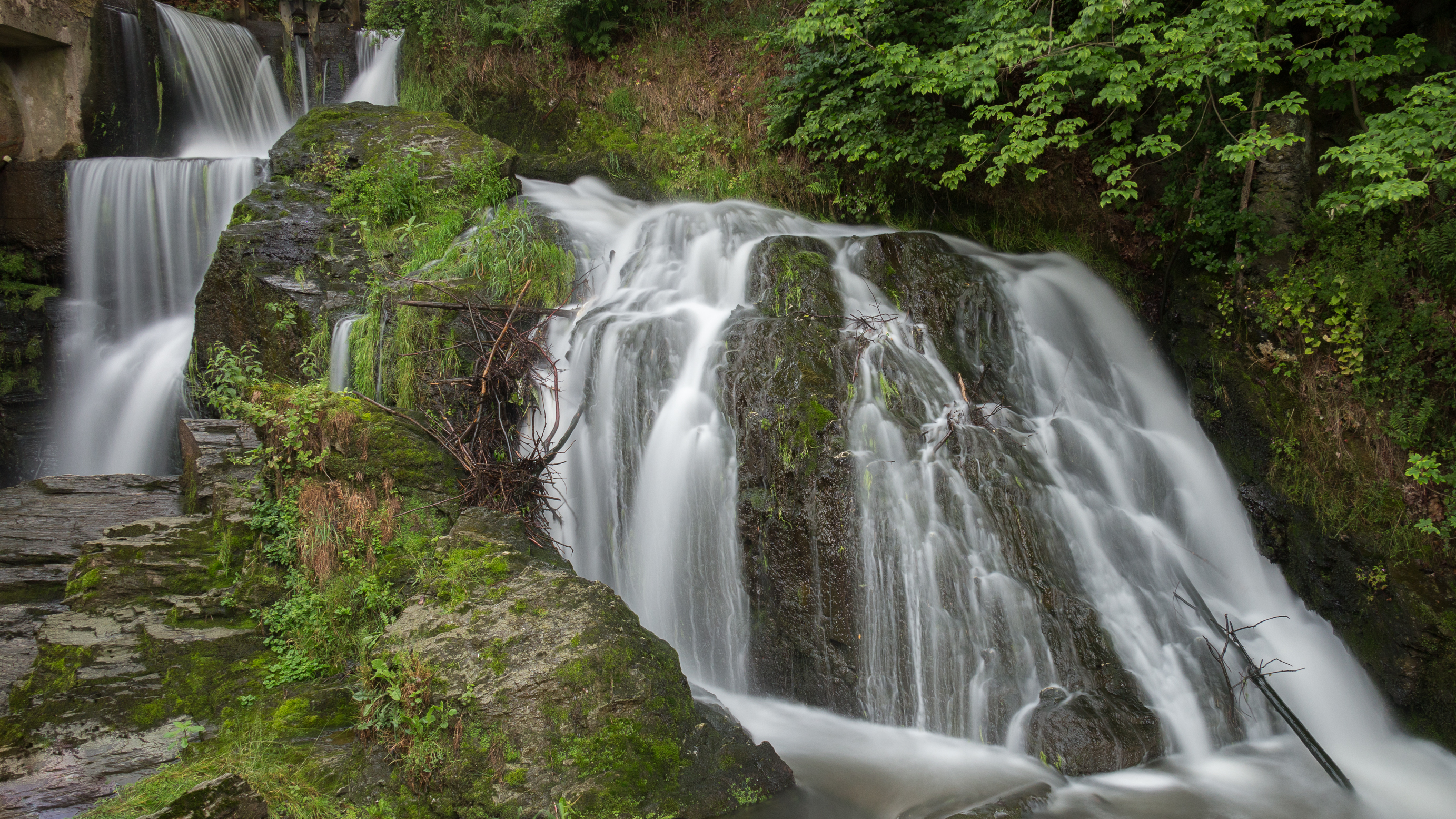
- Waterfall in Adolfseck

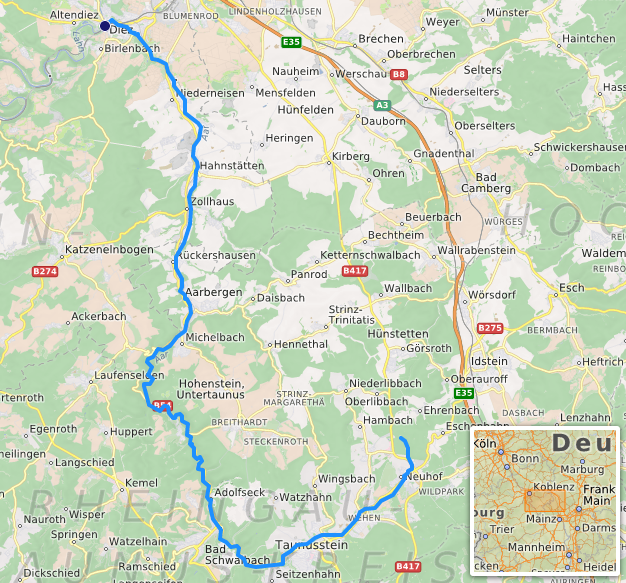

Location
- Country: Germany

Physical characteristics
- Source
  - location: Taunus
- Mouth
  - location: Lahn
  - coordinates: 50°22′7″N 8°0′20″E
- Length: 49.7 km (30.9 mi)
- Basin size: 313 km^{2} (121 sq mi)

Basin features
- Progression: Lahn→ Rhine→ North Sea

The Aar (German pronunciation: [aːɐ]) is a 50-kilometre-long (31 mi) river of Hesse and Rhineland-Palatinate, in western Germany, left tributary of the Lahn. It rises in the Taunus mountains, near Taunusstein. It flows generally north through the towns Taunusstein, Bad Schwalbach, Aarbergen and Hahnstätten. It flows into the Lahn in Diez.

== Name ==
The name Aar is a common name of rivers and brooks in German-speaking Central Europe, as exemplified by the similarly named tributary to the same Lahn river Aar (Dill). The pre-German word Aar means "quick-flowing water", in a metaphorical sense "small river in a space between mountains." It is commonly conserved in southern German-speaking areas in settlement names ending with -ach.

== Course ==
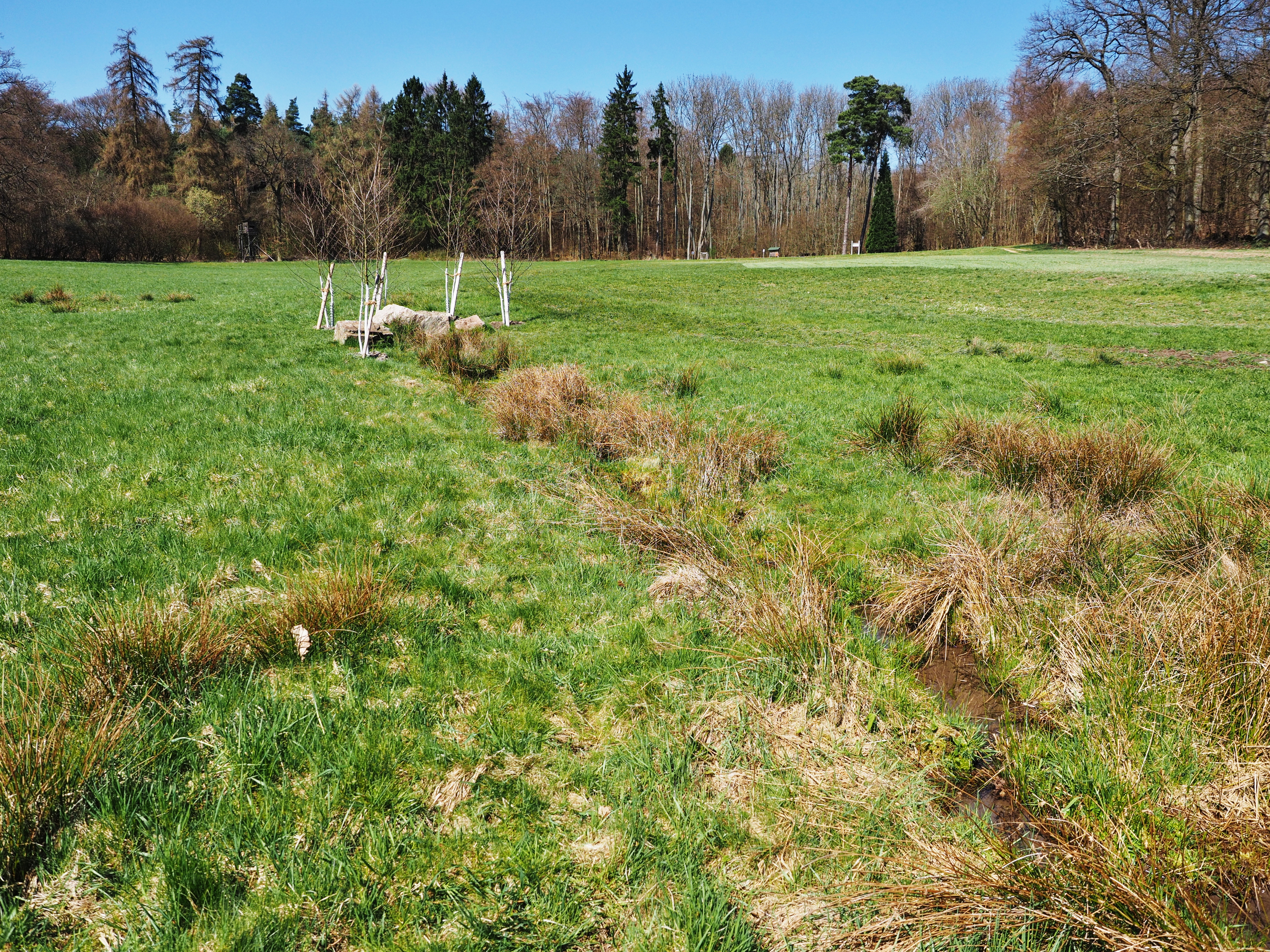
The Aar's source in the Taunus

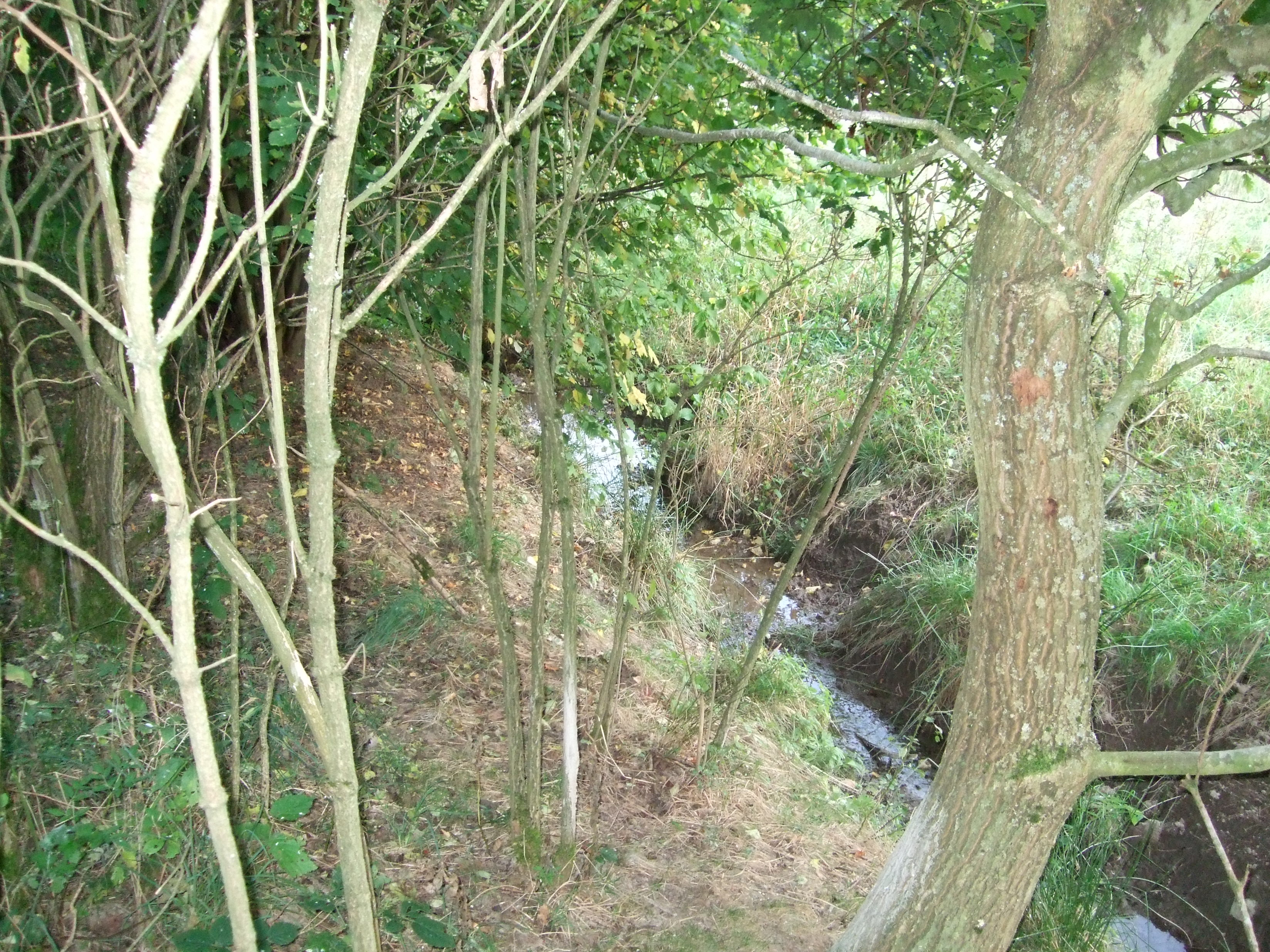
The Aar near its source

The Aar has its source in the Hessian Taunus south of limes, 500 metres (1,600 ft) from the ruins of Roman Castle Zugmantel and the Bundesstraße 417 in the Orlen part of Taunusstein. It flows first to the South, and then in a wide valley running in a southwesterly direction through Neuhof, Wehen, Hahn and Bleidenstadt (all in Taunusstein).

After Bleidenstadt the valley narrows, and the Aar reaches its southernmost point and turns to the northwest. In Bad Schwalbach its only nameworthy left tributary, the Nesselbach, flows into it, and it reaches the town's Adolfseck area. Shortly thereafter it crosses the Limes.

Below the Burg Hohenstein it passes by the town of the same name and above Michelbach it becomes the border river with Rheinland-Pfalz for a few kilometers. In Aarbergen the river then flows by Michelbach and Kettenbach and takes in its most significant tributary, the 15-kilometre (9 mi) Aubach (historical name: Strinzbach), which has its source quite close to the Aar, just north of the Limes. Thereafter the valley leads to Hausen über Aar and to the last Hessian town, Rückershausen.

After crossing the bundesland border, the Aar runs through about 14 kilometres (9 mi) of Rheinland-Pfalz, touching on the towns Schiesheim, Zollhaus and Hahnstätten, Oberneisen, Niederneisen and Flacht. With the townships of Holzheim and Freiendiez it reaches Diez and enters the Lahn.

== See also ==
- List of rivers of Rhineland-Palatinate
- List of rivers of Hesse
