= Flacht =

- Municipality
- Coat of arms

- Location of Flacht within Rhein-Lahn-Kreis district
- Interactive map of Flacht
- Location within Germany Location within Rhineland-Palatinate
- Coordinates: 50°20′43″N 8°3′1″E
- Country: Germany
- State: Rhineland-Palatinate
- District: Rhein-Lahn-Kreis
- Municipal assoc.: Aar-Einrich

Government
  - Mayor (2019–24): Timo Schneider (SPD)

Area
  - Total: 4.44 km^{2} (1.71 sq mi)
- Elevation: 125 m (410 ft)

Population (2025-12-31)
  - Total: 964
  - Density: 217/km^{2} (562/sq mi)
- Time zone: UTC+01:00 (CET)
  - Summer (DST): UTC+02:00 (CEST)
- Postal codes: 65558
- Dialling codes: 06432
- Vehicle registration: EMS, DIZ, GOH
- Website: www.flacht-aar.de

Flacht (German pronunciation: [flaxt]) is a municipality in the district of Rhein-Lahn, in Rhineland-Palatinate, in western Germany. It belongs to the association community of Aar-Einrich.

== Traffic ==
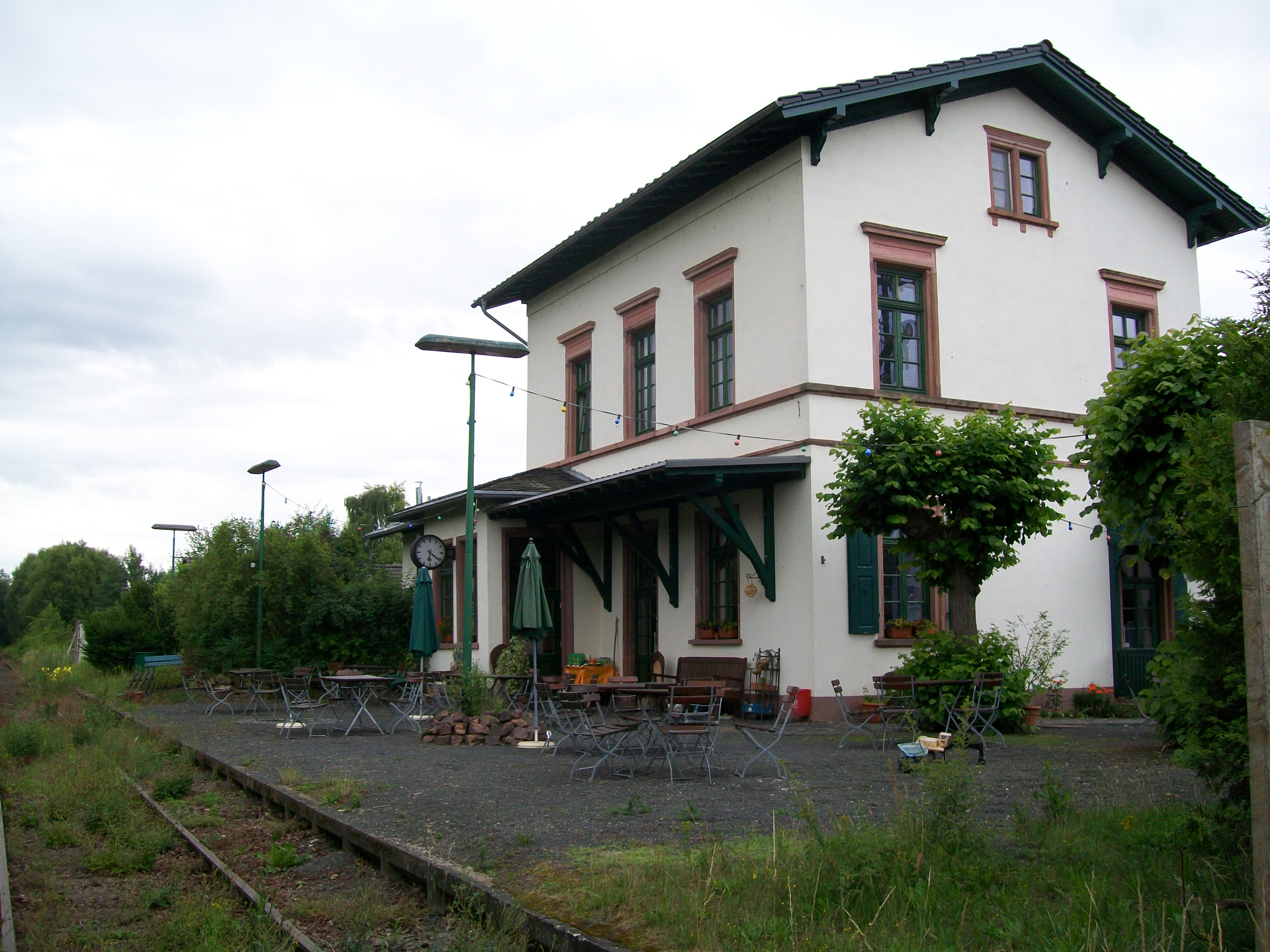
Former train station Flacht

Flacht had a station at the Aar Valley Railway, the public transport has been discontinued in 1986, an interest group has been foundet, the Arbeitskreis Aartalbahn e. V. that wants to conserve the line and uses it for railbike tours. Nowadays the nearest railway Station is in Diez at the Lahntal railway. Flacht is located in the zone nunber 522 of the Verkehrsverbund Rhein-Mosel (VRM). Flacht is served by the local busses of the line 570 which runs from Limburg (Lahn) station via Diez, Flacht, Niederneisen, Hahnstätten and Zollhaus to Michelbach.
