= Aubach (Aar) =

River in Germany

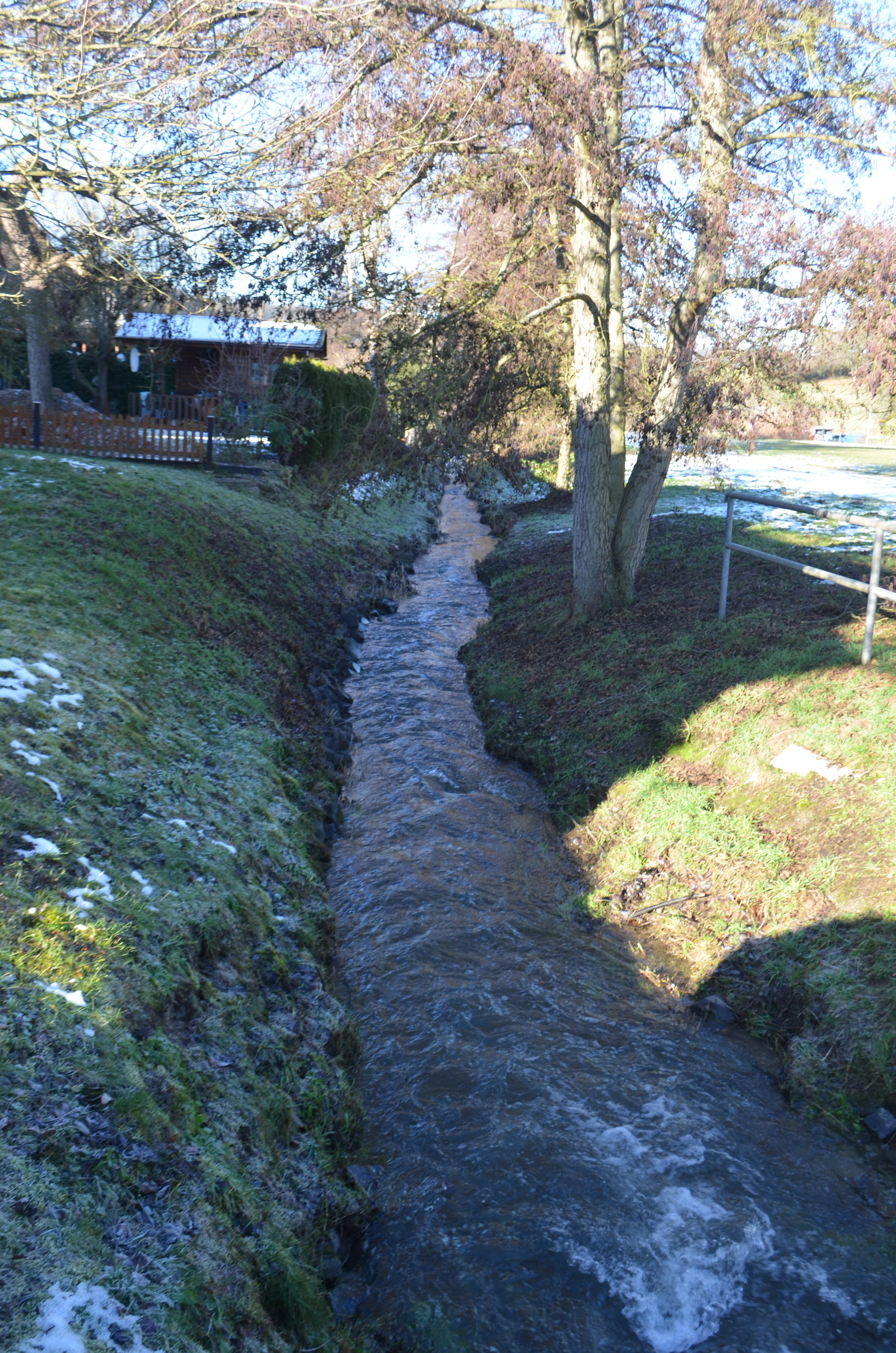

- Location of mouth in Hesse

Location
- Country: Germany
- State: Hesse

Physical characteristics
- Mouth
  - location: Aar
  - coordinates: 50.2452°N 8.0644°E
- Length: 15.1 km (9.4 mi)

Basin features
- Progression: Aar→ Lahn→ Rhine→ North Sea

The Aubach (historical name: Strinzbach) is a river of Hesse, Germany. It is a tributary of the Aar near Aarbergen.

== See also ==
- List of rivers of Hesse
