= Bruno Weil =

German conductor

Bruno Weil (born 24 November 1949, in Hahnstätten) is a German symphonic conductor. He is principal guest conductor of Tafelmusik, the period-instrument group based in Toronto, music director of the Carmel Bach Festival in California, and artistic director of the period-instrument festival "Klang und Raum" (Sound and Space) in Irsee, Bavaria. He has served as general music director of Augsburg (1981–1989), and of Duisburg (1989–2002). He currently serves as professor of conducting at the State Academy for Music and Theater in Munich.

He was a student of Hans Swarowsky and Franco Ferrara. Following his studies, he went on to win several important international competitions.

In 1988, he replaced Herbert von Karajan at short notice at the Salzburg Festival, conducting three of six performances of Mozart's Don Giovanni (Aug. 19, 22 and 25). He has appeared as guest conductor with leading orchestras in the US, the UK, Germany, France, Japan, Canada, Italy, Brazil, Holland, Norway, Austria and Australia. Orchestras he has conducted include the Berlin Philharmonic, Bavarian State Orchestra, Dresden Staatskapelle, the Vienna Philharmonic, Vienna Symphony Orchestra, the Los Angeles Philharmonic, l'Montreal Symphony Orchestra, the Orchestra of the Age of Enlightenment, l'Orchestre National de France, the Sydney Symphony Orchestra, The English Chamber Orchestra, NHK Orchestra Tokyo, Boston Symphony Orchestra, San Francisco Symphony, and Saint Paul Chamber Orchestra.

He has made many recordings with Tafelmusik, the Orchestra of the Age of Enlightenment and the Vienna Symphony Orchestra for the Sony Classical label. His recording of the "Paris" Symphonies by Haydn won the MIDEM Cannes Classical award in 1996 (in the category for 17th and 18th century orchestral music). Bruno Weil and Tafelmusik have also been awarded the Deutscher Schallplattenpreis (Echo Klassik Award) as Orchestra of the Year in 1996 for their recording of Haydn's Missa Sancti Bernardi (Heiligmesse), and in 1997, he won the Echo Klassik Award as Conductor of the Year. His recording of the opera Endimione by Johann Christian Bach won the Echo Klassik Award 2000 – Best opera recording 17th/18th century.
