= Schönborn, Rhein-Lahn =

Schönborn
- Municipality
- Coat of arms

- Location of Schönborn within Rhein-Lahn-Kreis district
- Interactive map of Schönborn
- Location within Germany Location within Rhineland-Palatinate
- Coordinates: 50°18′9″N 7°59′42″E
- Country: Germany
- State: Rhineland-Palatinate
- District: Rhein-Lahn-Kreis
- Municipal assoc.: Aar-Einrich

Government
  - Mayor (2019–24): Bernd Roßtäuscher

Area
  - Total: 11.71 km^{2} (4.52 sq mi)
- Elevation: 320 m (1,050 ft)

Population (2025-12-31)
  - Total: 716
  - Density: 61.1/km^{2} (158/sq mi)
- Time zone: UTC+01:00 (CET)
  - Summer (DST): UTC+02:00 (CEST)
- Postal codes: 56370
- Dialling codes: 06486
- Vehicle registration: EMS, DIZ, GOH

Schönborn (German pronunciation: [ˈʃøːnbɔʁn]) is a municipality in the district of Rhein-Lahn, in Rhineland-Palatinate, in western Germany. It belongs to the association community of Aar-Einrich.

Schönborn is the origin of the Counts of Schönborn. Between 1100 and 1479, the lords were vassals of the Counts of Katzenelnbogen whose castle at Katzenelnbogen was three miles away. Today a little house next to the church is still called Schönborner Hof.
