= Harald Braem =

German writer, designer and professor

Harald Braem alias Wolfram vom Stein (born 23 July 1944 in Berlin) is a German writer, designer and professor who specializes in color psychology.

Mr. Braem spent his childhood in Allendorf, Westerwald. He attended primary and secondary school in Hildesheim and later studied graphic design in Hildesheim and Hannover.

He has worked as a teacher, carried out comparative cultural investigations about matters related to archaeology and ancient history in the Canary Islands and the Egyptian pyramids, as well as conducted research pertaining to shamanism and cave painting.

== Life ==
Harald Braem spent his childhood in Allendorf, located in the Westerwald. Beginning in 1949, he attended primary and secondary school in Hildesheim. In 1962 he began his instruction in drawing and graphic arts at the Fachhochschule Hildesheim/Holzminden/Göttingen or HAWK, a communication arts school in Hildesheim, then at a college for the advertising arts in Hannover. Subsequently, he worked as an advertising agency copywriter and creative director and from 1981 until 2000 as a graphic design professor at a vocational school in Wiesbaden. His area of expertise is Color psychology.

Harald Braem is a member of the Berufsverband Deutscher Psychologinnen und Psychologen, an occupational organization for German psychologists. In 2005 he received the Verdienstmedaille des Landes Rheinland-Pfalz, a medal of merit granted to him by the German State of Rheinland-Pfalz. In 2006 he founded Das Institut für Farbpsychologie, (Institute for Color Psychology) in Bettendorf. He has written numerous technical books and articles, among others, the standard work "Die Macht der Farben", ("The Power of Colors"). However, his avid interest as a writer extends much further, with published works ranging from poetry to fantasy to historical novels.

Beside his duties as an instructor, Braem had done extensive work in the areas of folklore, comparative cultural studies and archeology. Of particular interest to him is the ancient and early history of the Canary Islands, pyramids, shamanism, cave paintings and petroglyphs.

Since 1988 Braem has headed the Kult-Ur-Institut für interdisziplinäre Kulturforschung in his place of residence, Bettendorf, located in the state of Rheinland-Pfalz He is a curator for the World Heritage Museum in Bettendorf und the initiator of many cultural projects. Some examples are the Nassauer Kulturpreis, the Nastätter Literaturtage, the Förderkreis Keltenhof Bettendorf, the Limeskastell Pohl, and the Kunst- & Literaturpfad Loreley or KLP.

== Prizes ==
- 2005: Verdienstmedaille des Landes Rheinland-Pfalz

== Works ==
- Ein blauer Falter über der Rasierklinge, Frankfurt am Main [u.a.] 1980
- "Die Nacht der verzauberten Katzen" und andere Geschichten, Frankfurt am Main [u.a.] 1982
- Die letzten 48 Stunden, München 1983 (with Wolfgang Fienhold)
- Die Macht der Farben, München 1985
- Träume in Blech und Papier, Bern [u.a.] 1985 (with Manfred Schmidtke)
- Das große Guten-Morgen-Buch, Göttingen 1985
- Brainfloating, München 1986
- Morgana oder Die Suche nach der Vergangenheit, München 1986
- Sirius grüßt den Rest der Welt, München 1987
- Der Eidechsenmann, München 1988
- Auf den Spuren atlantischer Völker: Die Kanarischen Inseln, München 1988 (with Marianne Braem)
- Der Löwe von Uruk, München [u.a.] 1988
- Selftiming, München 1988
- Zodiak, München 1988
- Die Balearen, München 1989
- Ein Sommer aus Beton, Würzburg 1989
- Hem-On, der Ägypter, München [u.a.] 1990
- Der Kojote im Vulkan, Berlin 1990
- Die Sprache der Formen, München 1990
- Tanausu - der letzte König der Kanaren, München [u.a.] 1991
- Große Spinne, kleine Spinne, Kaiserslautern 1992
- Das magische Dreieck, Stuttgart [u.a.] 1992
- Bibliographie des deutschsprachigen Schrifttums zur internationalen Felsbildforschung, Lollschied 1994 (with Thomas Schulte im Walde)
- Der Herr des Feuers, München [u.a.] 1994
- Die magische Welt der Schamanen und Höhlenmaler, Köln 1994
- Der Vulkanteufel, Stuttgart [u.a.] 1994
- Das Hotel zum Schwarzen Prinzen, München [u.a.] 1995
- Magische Riten und Kulte, Stuttgart [u.a.] 1995
- Der Wunderberg, Stuttgart [u.a.] 1996
- Der König von Tara, Stuttgart [u.a.] 1997
- Paläste, Tempel, Hieroglyphen, Bindlach 1997 (with Christof Heil)
- An den Küsten der Sehnsucht, Bettendorf 1999
- Das blaue Land, Stuttgart [u.a.] 2000
- Frogmusic, Plön 2001
- Meine Steppe brennt, Bettendorf 2006
