= Mappershainer Kopf =

Coordinates: 50°10′N 7°59′E

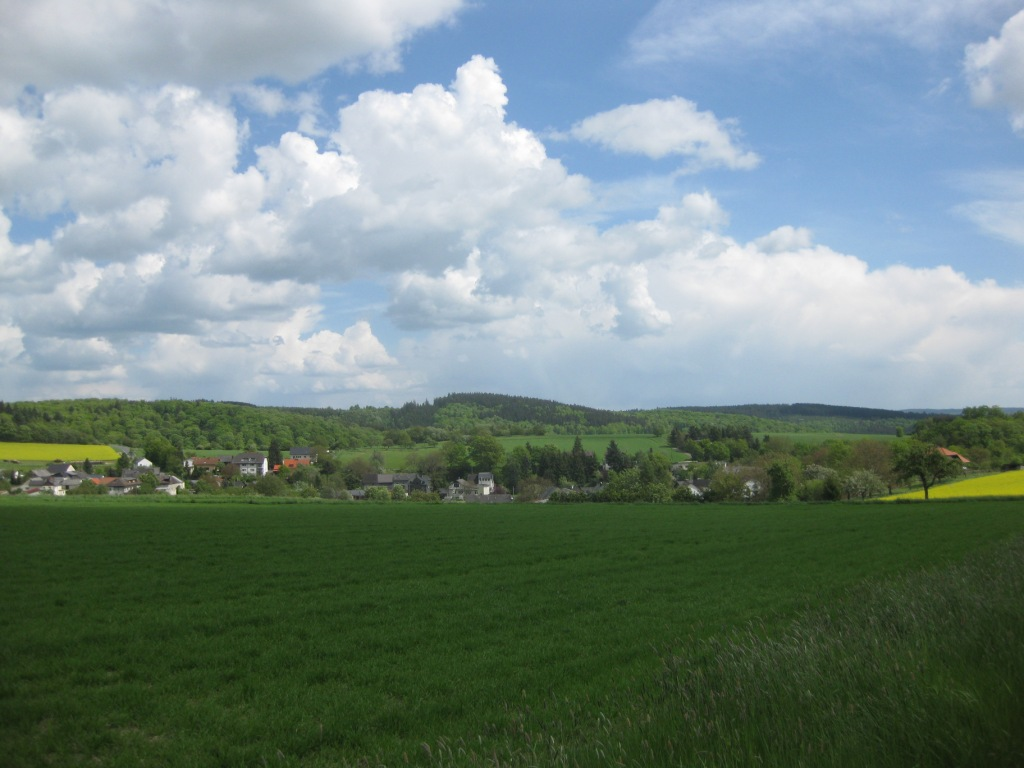
- Mappershainer Kopf in the western Hintertaunus.

Highest point
- Elevation: 548 m (1,798 ft)

Geography
- Location: Hesse, Germany

Mappershainer Kopf is a hill in Hesse, Germany, part of the Taunus range.

It peaks at an elevation of 548 metres (1,798 ft), making it the highest peak in the western part of the Taunus. It has a prominence of 78 metres (256 ft). The nearest settlement is Mapperhain and the nearest town is Heidenrod.

The hill is located about one km west of the watershed point between the Dörsbach river to the north and the Wisper in the west, both of which originate here, and the Aar in the east (all tributaries of the river Lahn).

The B260 federal highway passes close by.
