= Ergeshausen =

- Municipality
- Coat of arms

- Location of Ergeshausen within Rhein-Lahn-Kreis district
- Interactive map of Ergeshausen
- Location within Germany Location within Rhineland-Palatinate
- Coordinates: 50°16′19″N 7°56′30″E
- Country: Germany
- State: Rhineland-Palatinate
- District: Rhein-Lahn-Kreis
- Municipal assoc.: Aar-Einrich

Government
  - Mayor (2019–24): Harald Bernd Focke

Area
  - Total: 2.26 km^{2} (0.87 sq mi)
- Elevation: 310 m (1,020 ft)

Population (2025-12-31)
  - Total: 123
  - Density: 54.4/km^{2} (141/sq mi)
- Time zone: UTC+01:00 (CET)
  - Summer (DST): UTC+02:00 (CEST)
- Postal codes: 56368
- Dialling codes: 06486
- Vehicle registration: EMS, DIZ, GOH

Ergeshausen is a municipality in the district of Rhein-Lahn, in Rhineland-Palatinate, in western Germany. It belongs to the association community of Aar-Einrich.
