= Oberfischbach =

- Municipality
- Coat of arms

- Location of Oberfischbach within Rhein-Lahn-Kreis district
- Interactive map of Oberfischbach
- Location within Germany Location within Rhineland-Palatinate
- Coordinates: 50°15′00″N 7°57′19″E
- Country: Germany
- State: Rhineland-Palatinate
- District: Rhein-Lahn-Kreis
- Municipal assoc.: Aar-Einrich

Government
  - Mayor (2019–24): Heinz Eberhardt

Area
  - Total: 5.04 km^{2} (1.95 sq mi)
- Elevation: 355 m (1,165 ft)

Population (2025-12-31)
  - Total: 142
  - Density: 28.2/km^{2} (73.0/sq mi)
- Time zone: UTC+01:00 (CET)
  - Summer (DST): UTC+02:00 (CEST)
- Postal codes: 56370
- Dialling codes: 06486
- Vehicle registration: EMS, DIZ, GOH

Oberfischbach is a municipality in the district of Rhein-Lahn, in Rhineland-Palatinate, in western Germany. It belongs to the association community of Aar-Einrich.
