= Herold, Germany =

Herold
- Municipality
- Coat of arms

- Location of Herold within Rhein-Lahn-Kreis district
- Interactive map of Herold
- Location within Germany Location within Rhineland-Palatinate
- Coordinates: 50°16′43″N 7°56′1″E
- Country: Germany
- State: Rhineland-Palatinate
- District: Rhein-Lahn-Kreis
- Municipal assoc.: Aar-Einrich

Government
  - Mayor (2019–24): Jörg Schramm

Area
  - Total: 4.09 km^{2} (1.58 sq mi)
- Elevation: 344 m (1,129 ft)

Population (2025-12-31)
  - Total: 384
  - Density: 93.9/km^{2} (243/sq mi)
- Time zone: UTC+01:00 (CET)
  - Summer (DST): UTC+02:00 (CEST)
- Postal codes: 56368
- Dialling codes: 06486
- Vehicle registration: EMS, DIZ, GOH

Herold is a municipality in the district of Rhein-Lahn, in Rhineland-Palatinate, in western Germany. It belongs to the association community of Aar-Einrich.
