= Lohrheim =

- Municipality
- Coat of arms

- Location of Lohrheim within Rhein-Lahn-Kreis district
- Interactive map of Lohrheim
- Location within Germany Location within Rhineland-Palatinate
- Coordinates: 50°19′9″N 8°2′57″E
- Country: Germany
- State: Rhineland-Palatinate
- District: Rhein-Lahn-Kreis
- Municipal assoc.: Aar-Einrich

Government
  - Mayor (2019–24): Kai Schmidt

Area
  - Total: 4.13 km^{2} (1.59 sq mi)
- Elevation: 175 m (574 ft)

Population (2025-12-31)
  - Total: 590
  - Density: 140/km^{2} (370/sq mi)
- Time zone: UTC+01:00 (CET)
  - Summer (DST): UTC+02:00 (CEST)
- Postal codes: 65558
- Dialling codes: 06430
- Vehicle registration: EMS, DIZ, GOH

Lohrheim (German pronunciation: [ˈloːɐ̯haɪm]) is a municipality in the district of Rhein-Lahn, in Rhineland-Palatinate, in western Germany. It belongs to the association community of Aar-Einrich.

== Transport links ==
At the highway next to Lohrheim, a stop for Lohrheim at the local bus line number 570 is located, which runs from Limburg via Diez and Hahnstätten to Michelbach, Lohrheim is located in the area of the transport association Verkehrsverbund Rhein-Mosel (VRM), zone number 522.
