= Roth, Rhein-Lahn =

Roth
- Municipality
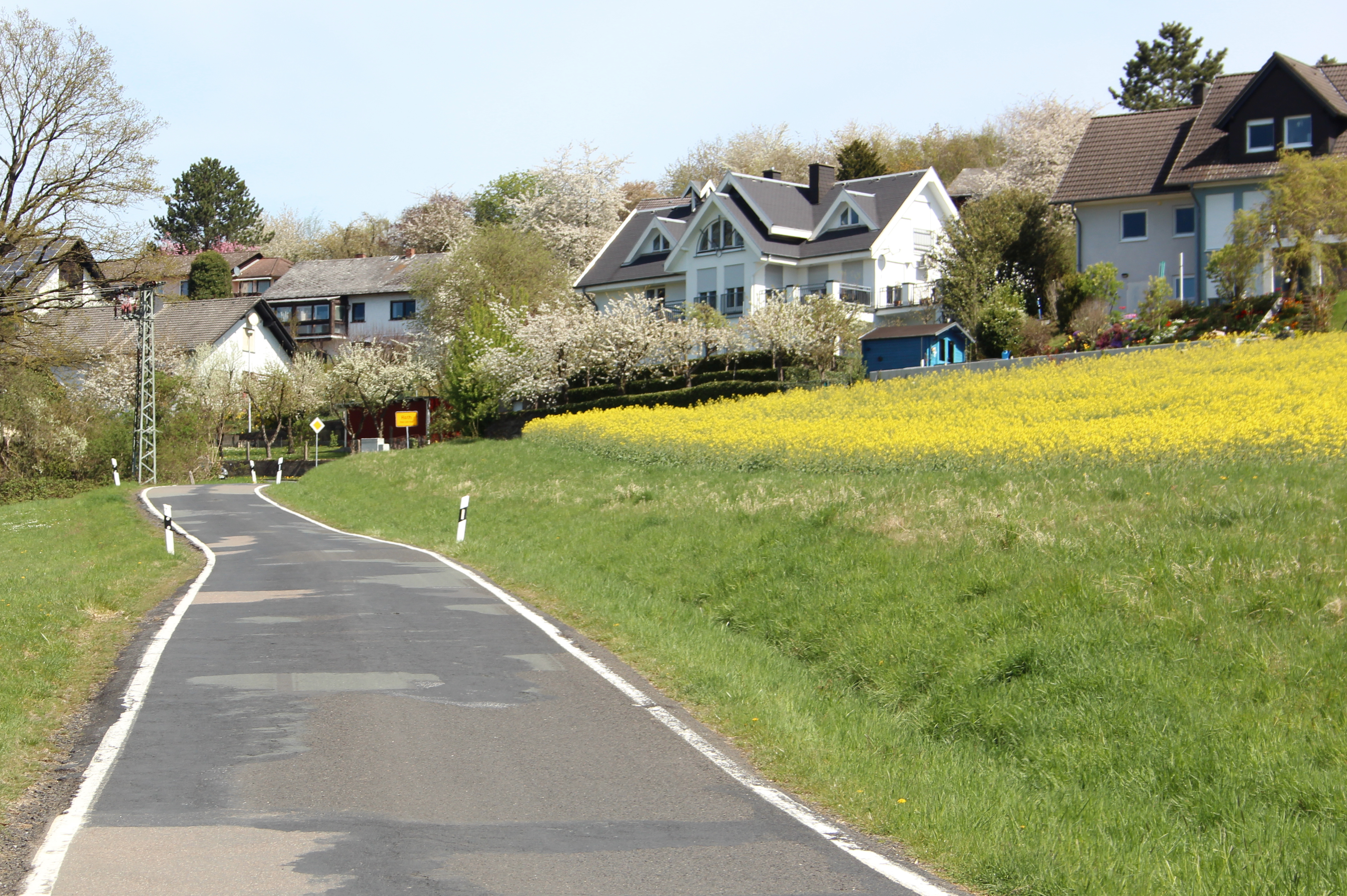

- Coat of arms

- Location of Roth within Rhein-Lahn-Kreis district
- Interactive map of Roth
- Location within Germany Location within Rhineland-Palatinate
- Coordinates: 50°16′3″N 7°53′46″E
- Country: Germany
- State: Rhineland-Palatinate
- District: Rhein-Lahn-Kreis
- Municipal assoc.: Aar-Einrich

Government
  - Mayor (2019–24): Reinhard Laux

Area
  - Total: 3.4 km^{2} (1.3 sq mi)
- Elevation: 330 m (1,080 ft)

Population (2025-12-31)
  - Total: 186
  - Density: 55/km^{2} (140/sq mi)
- Time zone: UTC+01:00 (CET)
  - Summer (DST): UTC+02:00 (CEST)
- Postal codes: 56368
- Dialling codes: 06772
- Vehicle registration: EMS, DIZ, GOH

Roth (German pronunciation: [ʁoːt]) is a municipality in the district of Rhein-Lahn, in Rhineland-Palatinate, in western Germany. It belongs to the association community of Aar-Einrich.
