= Nassau Light Railway =

German railway company

Nassau Light Railway Nassauische Kleinbahn AG
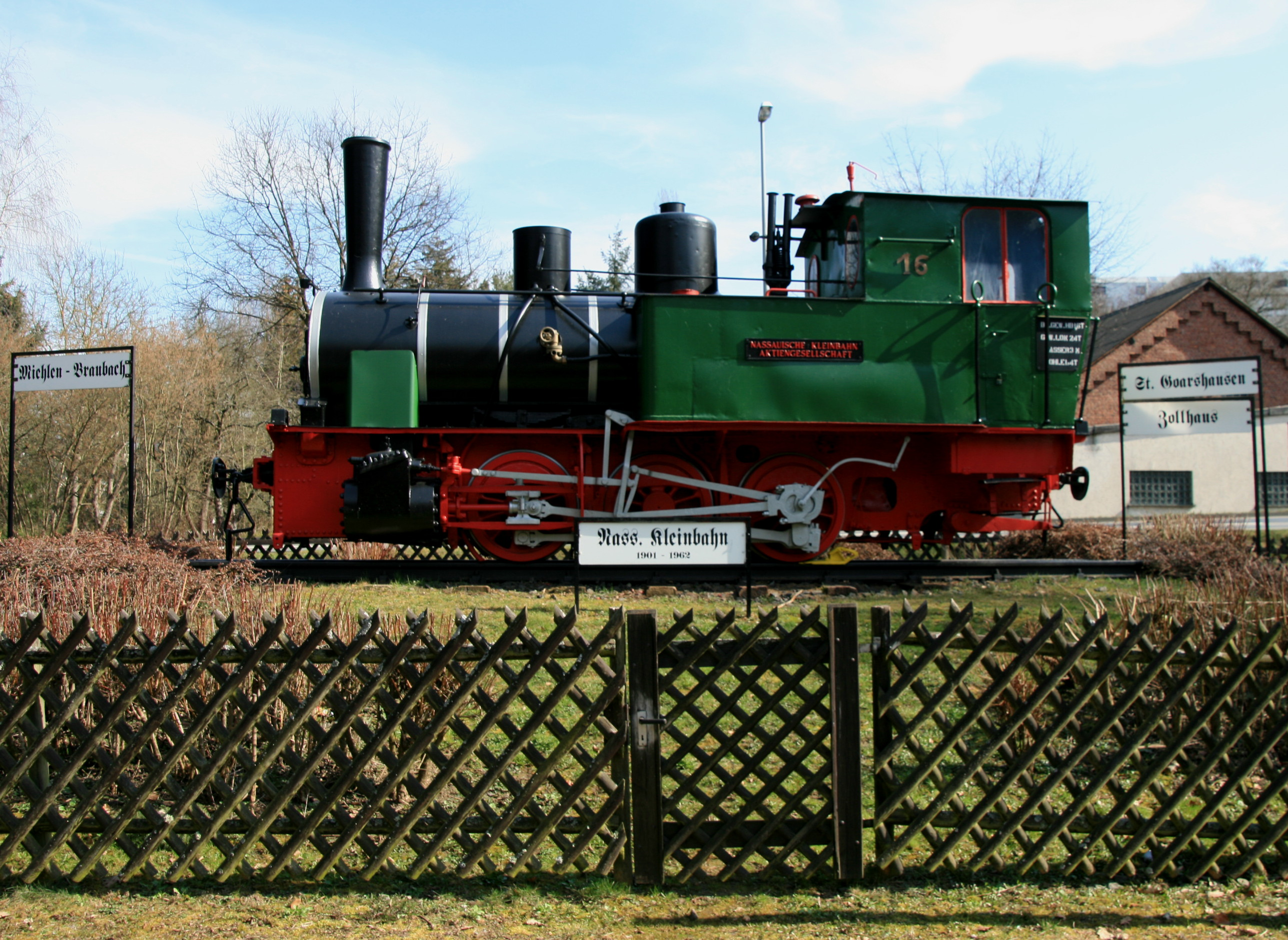
- Preserved locomotive of the Nassau Light Railway

Overview
- Headquarters: Nassau, Germany
- Locale: Germany
- Dates of operation: 1898–1977

The Nassau Light Railway (Nassauische Kleinbahn AG) was a narrow gauge railway in Nassau, Germany, connecting the Lahn, Aar and Rhine areas. It was founded in 1898, and the company existed until 1977, although its services were significantly reduced in the 1950s. Its bus lines are however operated by the Nassau Transport Company (Nassauische Verkehrs-GmbH).
