= Hahnstätten =

- Municipality
- Coat of arms

- Location of Hahnstätten within Rhein-Lahn-Kreis district
- Interactive map of Hahnstätten
- Location within Germany Location within Rhineland-Palatinate
- Coordinates: 50°18′16″N 8°04′11″E
- Country: Germany
- State: Rhineland-Palatinate
- District: Rhein-Lahn-Kreis
- Municipal assoc.: Aar-Einrich

Government
  - Mayor (2019–24): Joachim Egert

Area
  - Total: 10.7 km^{2} (4.1 sq mi)
- Elevation: 145 m (476 ft)

Population (2025-12-31)
  - Total: 3,008
  - Density: 281/km^{2} (728/sq mi)
- Time zone: UTC+01:00 (CET)
  - Summer (DST): UTC+02:00 (CEST)
- Postal codes: 65623
- Dialling codes: 06430
- Vehicle registration: EMS, DIZ, GOH
- Website: www.hahnstaetten.de

Hahnstätten (German pronunciation: [haːnˈʃtɛtn̩]) is a municipality in the Rhein-Lahn-Kreis, in Rhineland-Palatinate, Germany. It belongs to the association community of Aar-Einrich. It is situated on the river Aar, approx. 10 km south of Limburg an der Lahn, and 35 km east of Koblenz. In 1949 the conductor Bruno Weil was born here.

Hahnstätten was the seat of the former Verbandsgemeinde ("collective municipality") Hahnstätten.

There is a large limestone quarry, operated by Schaefer Kalk.

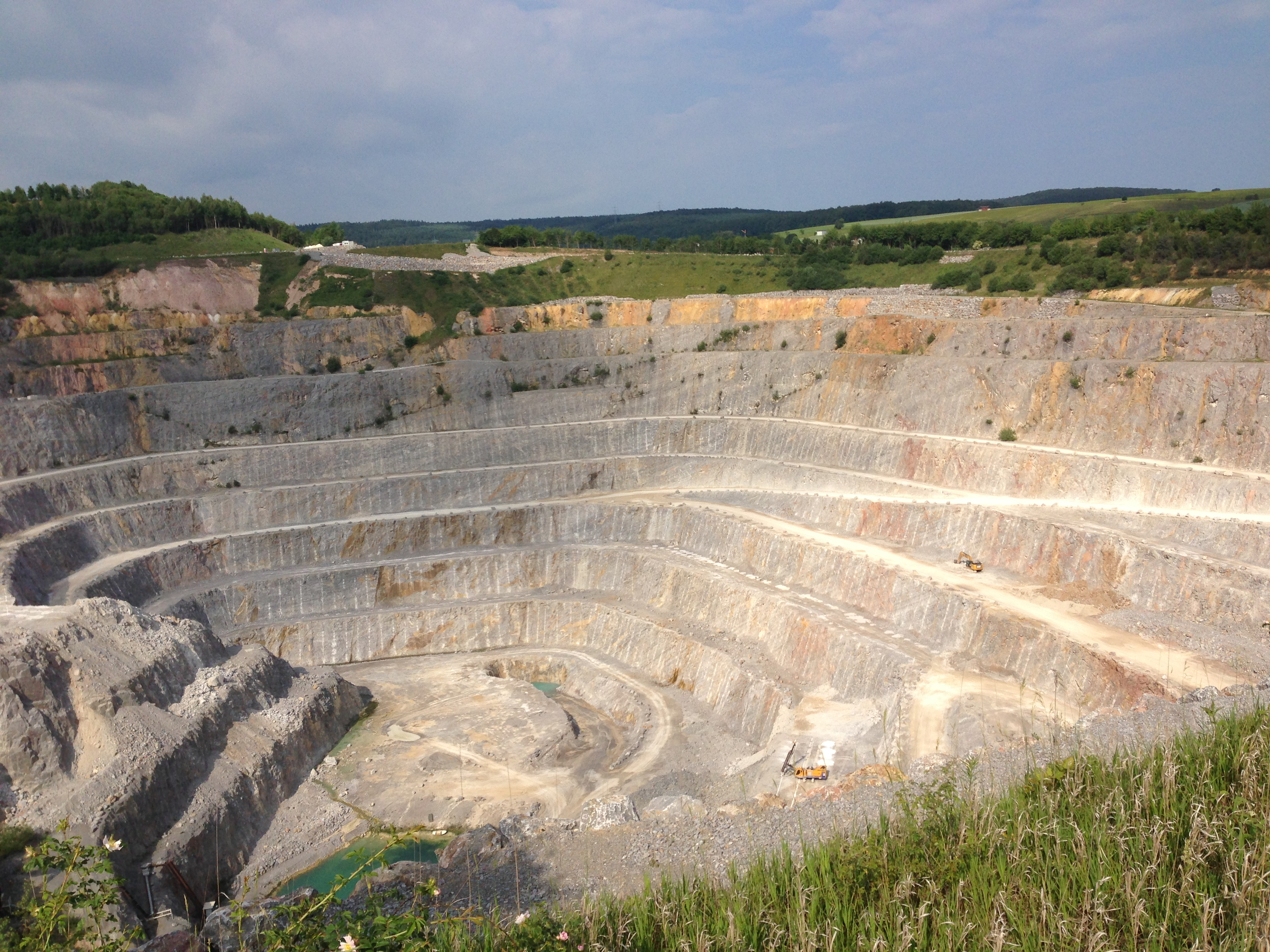
The Schaefer Kalk quarry

== Traffic ==
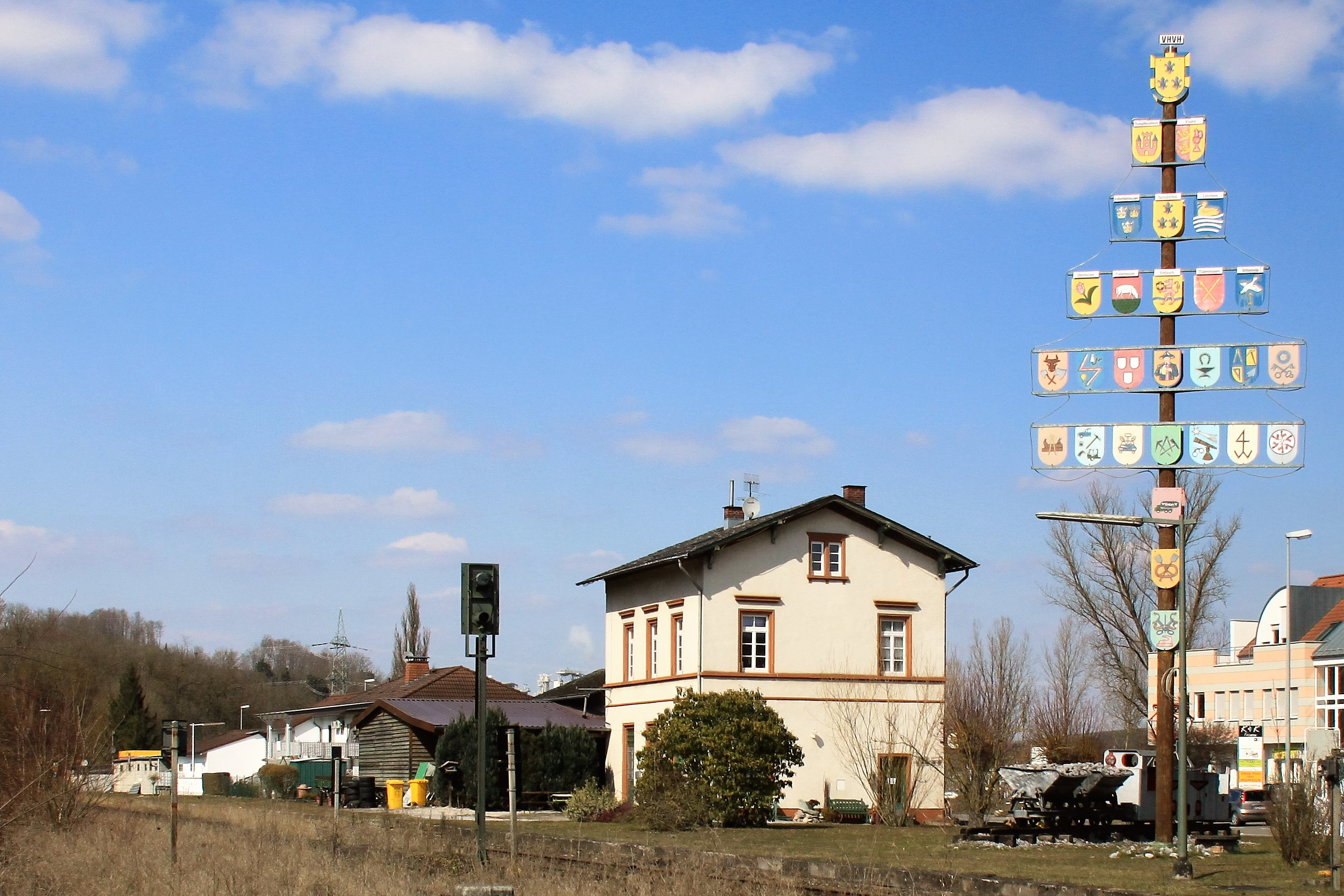
Former railway station on the Aartal railway line

The town is located on the Aar Valley Railway. Train service on the section has been discontinued in 1986, but railbike tours take place, organized by the interest group Arbeitskreis Aartalbahn e. V. that's goal is the conservation of this line. Nowadays Diez is the nearest railway station, located on the Lahntal railway. Nowadays, the local bus line number 570 runs primary beside the Aar Valley Railway.

Local buses serve the town nowadays and it is located in the area of Rhine-Moselle transport association (VRM), zone number 522.
