= Kördorf =

- Municipality
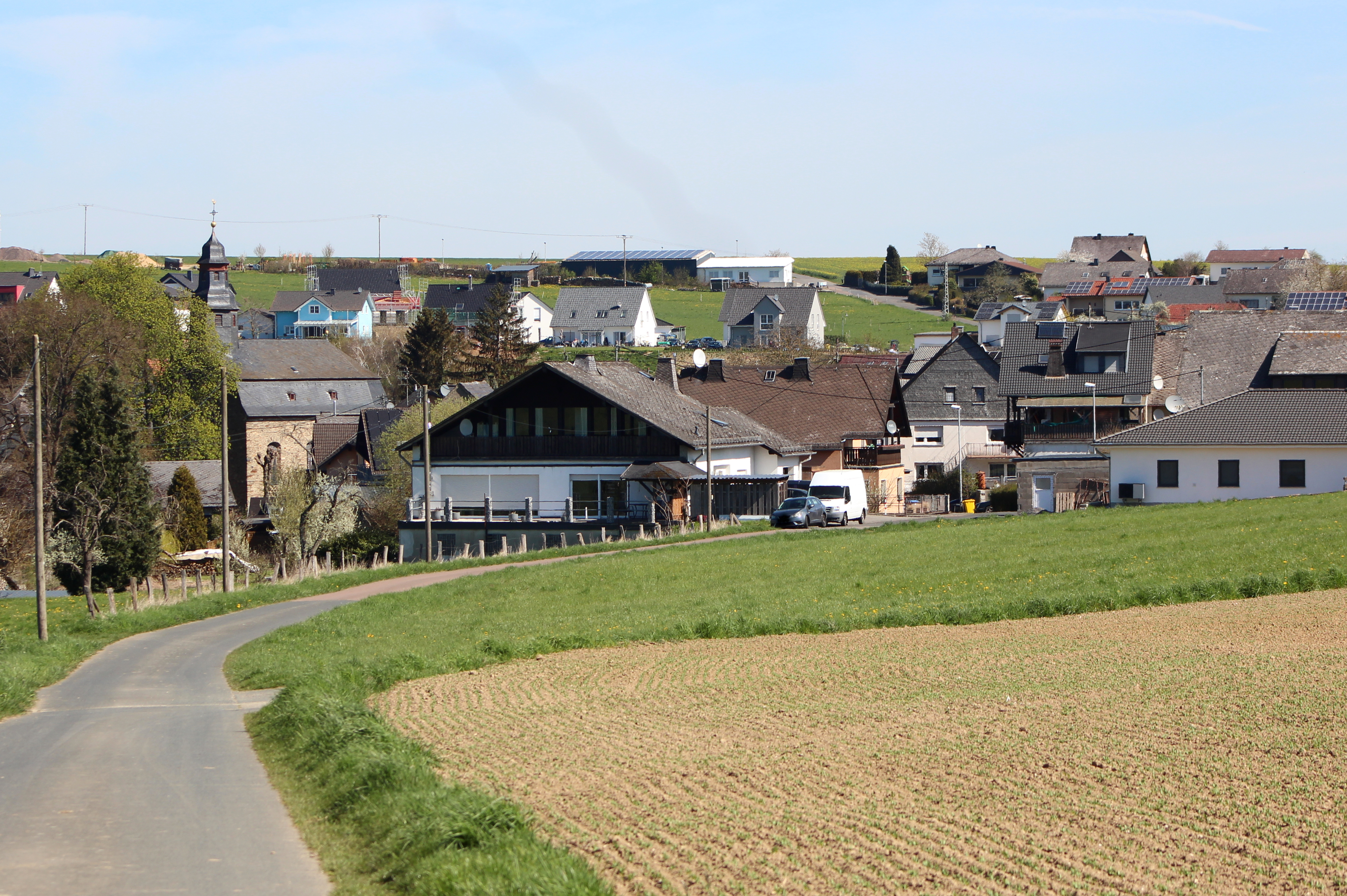

- Coat of arms

- Location of Kördorf within Rhein-Lahn-Kreis district
- Interactive map of Kördorf
- Location within Germany Location within Rhineland-Palatinate
- Coordinates: 50°17′15″N 7°55′15″E
- Country: Germany
- State: Rhineland-Palatinate
- District: Rhein-Lahn-Kreis
- Municipal assoc.: Aar-Einrich

Government
  - Mayor (2019–24): Bernhard Krugel

Area
  - Total: 7.81 km^{2} (3.02 sq mi)
- Elevation: 315 m (1,033 ft)

Population (2025-12-31)
  - Total: 561
  - Density: 71.8/km^{2} (186/sq mi)
- Time zone: UTC+01:00 (CET)
  - Summer (DST): UTC+02:00 (CEST)
- Postal codes: 56370
- Dialling codes: 06486
- Vehicle registration: EMS, DIZ, GOH
- Website: www.gemeinde-koerdorf.de

Kördorf is a municipality in the district of Rhein-Lahn, in Rhineland-Palatinate, in western Germany. It belongs to the association community of Aar-Einrich.
