= Gutenacker =

- Municipality
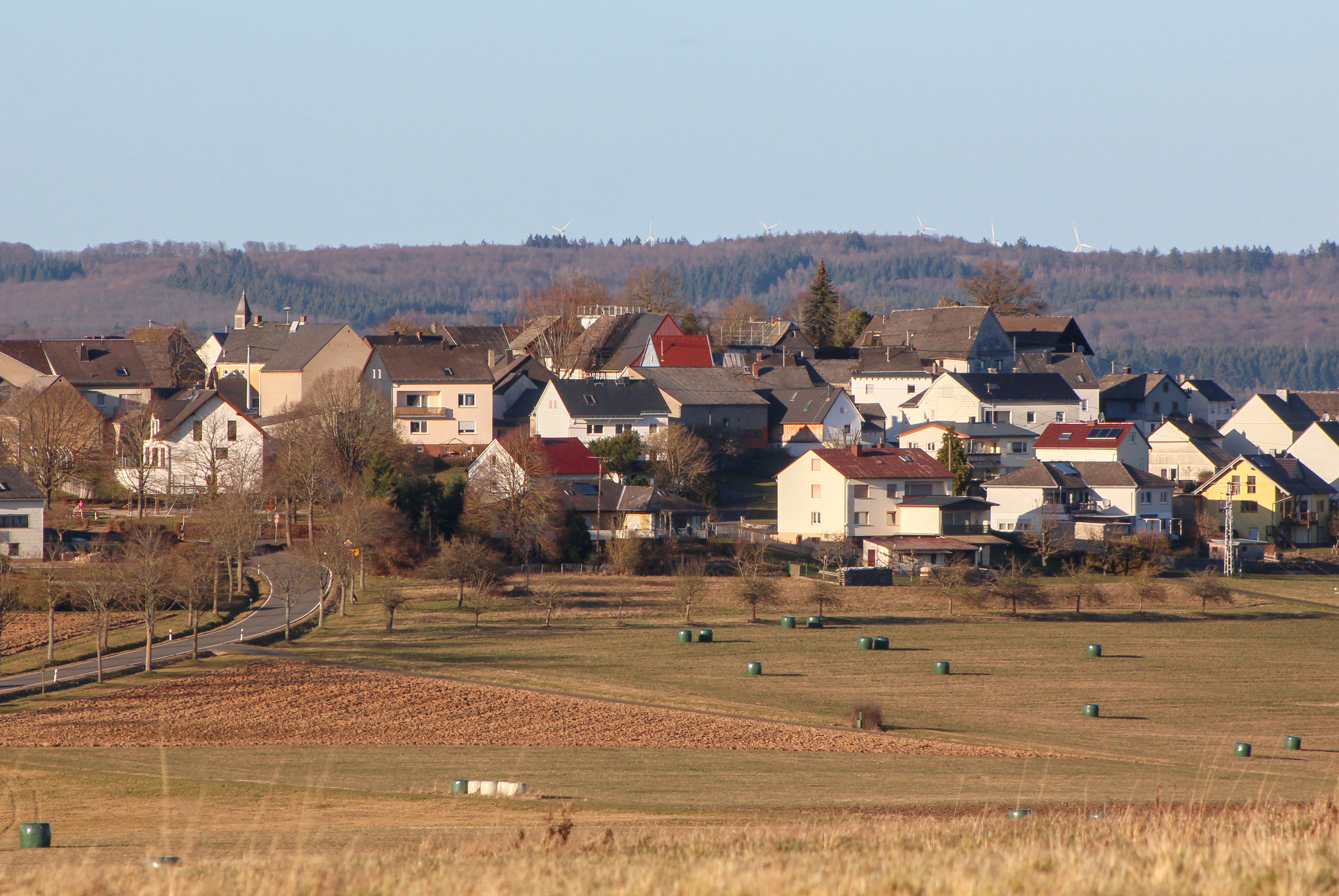

- Coat of arms

- Location of Gutenacker within Rhein-Lahn-Kreis district
- Interactive map of Gutenacker
- Location within Germany Location within Rhineland-Palatinate
- Coordinates: 50°19′9.59″N 7°55′19.66″E
- Country: Germany
- State: Rhineland-Palatinate
- District: Rhein-Lahn-Kreis
- Municipal assoc.: Aar-Einrich

Government
  - Mayor (2019–24): Udo Meister

Area
  - Total: 3.83 km^{2} (1.48 sq mi)
- Elevation: 278 m (912 ft)

Population (2025-12-31)
  - Total: 173
  - Density: 45.2/km^{2} (117/sq mi)
- Time zone: UTC+01:00 (CET)
  - Summer (DST): UTC+02:00 (CEST)
- Postal codes: 56370
- Dialling codes: 06439
- Vehicle registration: EMS, DIZ, GOH
- Website: www.ortsgemeinde-gutenacker.de

Gutenacker is a municipality in the district of Rhein-Lahn, in Rhineland-Palatinate, in western Germany. It belongs to the association community of Aar-Einrich.
