= Netzbach =

- Municipality
- Coat of arms

- Location of Netzbach within Rhein-Lahn-Kreis district
- Interactive map of Netzbach
- Location within Germany Location within Rhineland-Palatinate
- Coordinates: 50°19′4″N 8°5′44″E
- Country: Germany
- State: Rhineland-Palatinate
- District: Rhein-Lahn-Kreis
- Municipal assoc.: Aar-Einrich

Government
  - Mayor (2019–24): Horst Ackermann

Area
  - Total: 3.40 km^{2} (1.31 sq mi)
- Elevation: 178 m (584 ft)

Population (2025-12-31)
  - Total: 352
  - Density: 104/km^{2} (268/sq mi)
- Time zone: UTC+01:00 (CET)
  - Summer (DST): UTC+02:00 (CEST)
- Postal codes: 65623
- Dialling codes: 06430
- Vehicle registration: EMS, DIZ, GOH
- Website: www.netzbach.de

Netzbach is a municipality in the district of Rhein-Lahn, in Rhineland-Palatinate, in western Germany. It belongs to the association community of Aar-Einrich.
