= Bremberg =

- Municipality
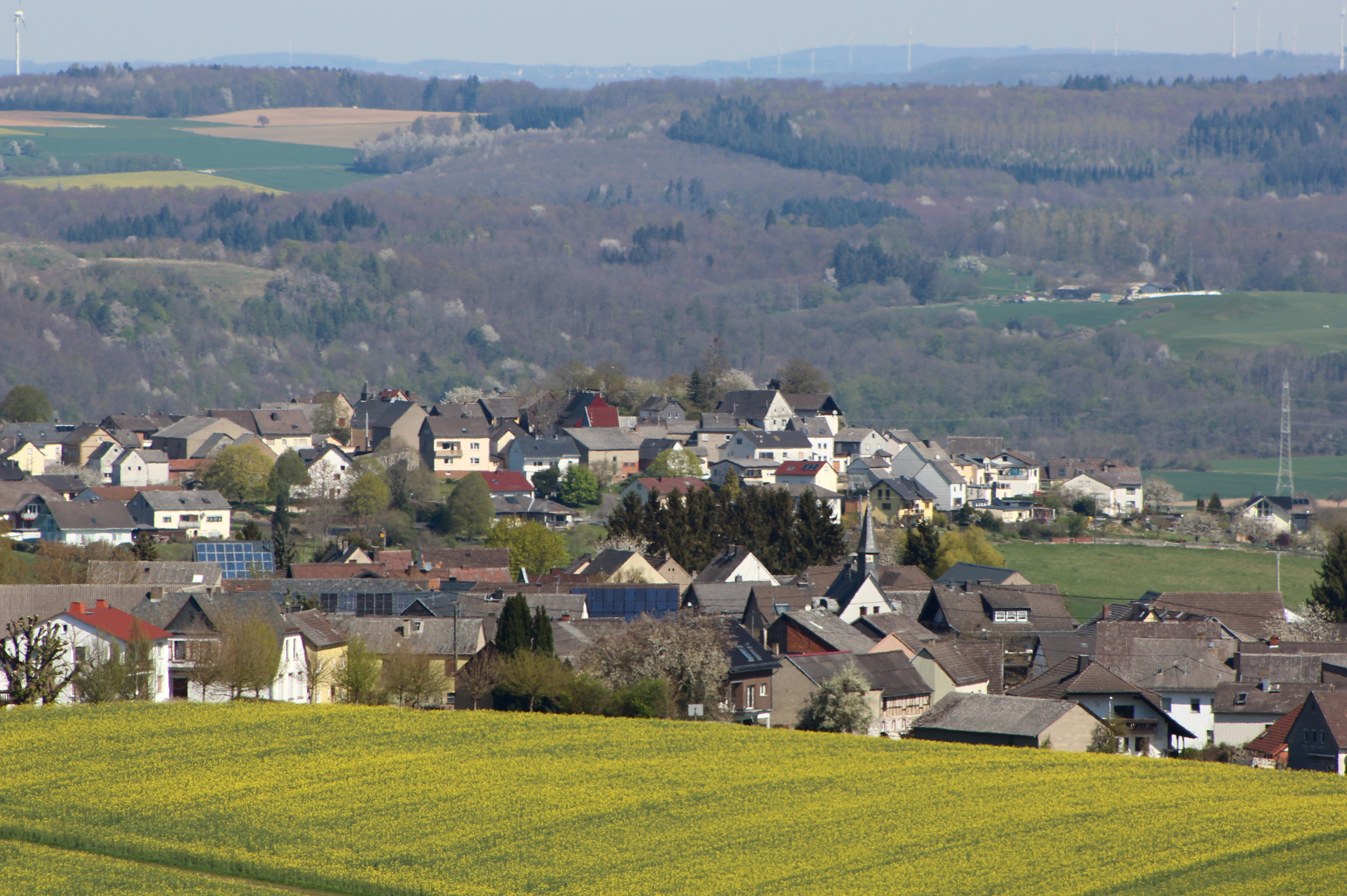

- Coat of arms

- Location of Bremberg within Rhein-Lahn-Kreis district
- Interactive map of Bremberg
- Location within Germany Location within Rhineland-Palatinate
- Coordinates: 50°18′22.52″N 7°55′14.29″E
- Country: Germany
- State: Rhineland-Palatinate
- District: Rhein-Lahn-Kreis
- Municipal assoc.: Aar-Einrich

Government
  - Mayor (2019–24): Matthias Meister

Area
  - Total: 6.07 km^{2} (2.34 sq mi)
- Elevation: 300 m (980 ft)

Population (2025-12-31)
  - Total: 263
  - Density: 43.3/km^{2} (112/sq mi)
- Time zone: UTC+01:00 (CET)
  - Summer (DST): UTC+02:00 (CEST)
- Postal codes: 56370
- Dialling codes: 06439, 02604
- Vehicle registration: EMS, DIZ, GOH

Bremberg is a municipality in the district of Rhein-Lahn, in Rhineland-Palatinate, in western Germany. It belongs to the association community of Aar-Einrich.
