= Kaltenholzhausen =

- Municipality
- Coat of arms

- Location of Kaltenholzhausen within Rhein-Lahn-Kreis district
- Interactive map of Kaltenholzhausen
- Location within Germany Location within Rhineland-Palatinate
- Coordinates: 50°18′6″N 8°6′26″E
- Country: Germany
- State: Rhineland-Palatinate
- District: Rhein-Lahn-Kreis
- Municipal assoc.: Aar-Einrich

Government
  - Mayor (2019–24): Christian Neeb

Area
  - Total: 6.06 km^{2} (2.34 sq mi)
- Elevation: 235 m (771 ft)

Population (2025-12-31)
  - Total: 540
  - Density: 89/km^{2} (230/sq mi)
- Time zone: UTC+01:00 (CET)
  - Summer (DST): UTC+02:00 (CEST)
- Postal codes: 65558
- Dialling codes: 06430
- Vehicle registration: EMS, DIZ, GOH

Kaltenholzhausen is a municipality in the district of Rhein-Lahn, in Rhineland-Palatinate, in western Germany. It belongs to the association community of Aar-Einrich.
