= Niederneisen =

- Municipality
- Coat of arms

- Location of Niederneisen within Rhein-Lahn-Kreis district
- Interactive map of Niederneisen
- Location within Germany Location within Rhineland-Palatinate
- Coordinates: 50°20′20″N 8°3′21″E
- Country: Germany
- State: Rhineland-Palatinate
- District: Rhein-Lahn-Kreis
- Municipal assoc.: Aar-Einrich

Government
  - Mayor (2019–24): Armin Bendel

Area
  - Total: 7.95 km^{2} (3.07 sq mi)
- Elevation: 130 m (430 ft)

Population (2025-12-31)
  - Total: 1,463
  - Density: 184/km^{2} (477/sq mi)
- Time zone: UTC+01:00 (CET)
  - Summer (DST): UTC+02:00 (CEST)
- Postal codes: 65629
- Dialling codes: 06432
- Vehicle registration: EMS, DIZ, GOH

Niederneisen is a municipality in the district of Rhein-Lahn, in Rhineland-Palatinate, in western Germany. It belongs to the association community of Aar-Einrich.

== Transport links ==
The local bus line 570, which runs from Limburg (Lahn) station via Diez, Holzheim, Flacht, Hahnstätten and Zollhaus to Michelbach serves Niederneisen, the village is located in the zone number 522 of the transport association Verkehrsverbund Rhein-Mosel (VRM). Also, Niederneisen is located on the Aar Valley Railway although there wasn't a stop or station in Niederneisen and the service has been discontinued, the interest group Arbeitskreis Aartalbahn e. V. has the goal to conserve the line and uses it for railbike tours.
