= Berghausen, Rhineland-Palatinate =

Berghausen
- Municipality
- Coat of arms

- Location of Berghausen within Rhein-Lahn-Kreis district
- Interactive map of Berghausen
- Location within Germany Location within Rhineland-Palatinate
- Coordinates: 50°15′32.9″N 8°0′22.44″E
- Country: Germany
- State: Rhineland-Palatinate
- District: Rhein-Lahn-Kreis
- Municipal assoc.: Aar-Einrich

Government
  - Mayor (2020–24): Peer Klein

Area
  - Total: 4.37 km^{2} (1.69 sq mi)
- Elevation: 340 m (1,120 ft)

Population (2025-12-31)
  - Total: 296
  - Density: 67.7/km^{2} (175/sq mi)
- Time zone: UTC+01:00 (CET)
  - Summer (DST): UTC+02:00 (CEST)
- Postal codes: 56368
- Dialling codes: 06486
- Vehicle registration: EMS, DIZ, GOH
- Website: www.berghausen-im-einrich.de

Berghausen is a municipality in the district of Rhein-Lahn, in Rhineland-Palatinate, in western Germany. It belongs to the association community of Aar-Einrich.

== Notable people ==
- Rudolf Diels, German politician and director of the Gestapo.
