= Mudershausen =

- Municipality
- Coat of arms

- Location of Mudershausen within Rhein-Lahn-Kreis district
- Interactive map of Mudershausen
- Location within Germany Location within Rhineland-Palatinate
- Coordinates: 50°16′46″N 8°2′25″E
- Country: Germany
- State: Rhineland-Palatinate
- District: Rhein-Lahn-Kreis
- Municipal assoc.: Aar-Einrich
- Subdivisions: 2

Government
  - Mayor (2019–24): Klaus Harbach

Area
  - Total: 4.72 km^{2} (1.82 sq mi)
- Elevation: 265 m (869 ft)

Population (2025-12-31)
  - Total: 457
  - Density: 96.8/km^{2} (251/sq mi)
- Time zone: UTC+01:00 (CET)
  - Summer (DST): UTC+02:00 (CEST)
- Postal codes: 65623
- Dialling codes: 06430
- Vehicle registration: EMS, DIZ, GOH

Mudershausen is a municipality in the district of Rhein-Lahn, in Rhineland-Palatinate, in western Germany. It belongs to the association community of Aar-Einrich.
