= Dörsdorf =

German municipality in Rhineland-Palatinate, Germany

- Municipality
- Coat of arms

- Location of Dörsdorf within Rhein-Lahn-Kreis district
- Interactive map of Dörsdorf
- Location within Germany Location within Rhineland-Palatinate
- Coordinates: 50°14′50.78″N 8°0′37.17″E
- Country: Germany
- State: Rhineland-Palatinate
- District: Rhein-Lahn-Kreis
- Municipal assoc.: Aar-Einrich

Government
  - Mayor (2019–24): Marcus Bär

Area
  - Total: 4.87 km^{2} (1.88 sq mi)
- Elevation: 310 m (1,020 ft)

Population (2025-12-31)
  - Total: 413
  - Density: 84.8/km^{2} (220/sq mi)
- Time zone: UTC+01:00 (CET)
  - Summer (DST): UTC+02:00 (CEST)
- Postal codes: 56370
- Dialling codes: 06486
- Vehicle registration: EMS, DIZ, GOH

Dörsdorf is a municipality in the district of Rhein-Lahn, in Rhineland-Palatinate, in western Germany. It belongs to the community of Aar-Einrich.

== Geography ==
The place is about four kilometers southeast of Katzenelnbogen. The Dörsbach flows through the village.

Dörsdorf also belongs to the community of Weidgesmühle.
