= Oberneisen =

- Municipality
- Coat of arms

- Location of Oberneisen within Rhein-Lahn-Kreis district
- Interactive map of Oberneisen
- Location within Germany Location within Rhineland-Palatinate
- Coordinates: 50°19′32″N 8°4′38″E
- Country: Germany
- State: Rhineland-Palatinate
- District: Rhein-Lahn-Kreis
- Municipal assoc.: Aar-Einrich

Government
  - Mayor (2019–24): Peter Pelk

Area
  - Total: 4.54 km^{2} (1.75 sq mi)
- Elevation: 135 m (443 ft)

Population (2025-12-31)
  - Total: 722
  - Density: 159/km^{2} (412/sq mi)
- Time zone: UTC+01:00 (CET)
  - Summer (DST): UTC+02:00 (CEST)
- Postal codes: 65558
- Dialling codes: 06430
- Vehicle registration: EMS, DIZ, GOH
- Website: www.oberneisen.de

Oberneisen is a municipality in the district of Rhein-Lahn, in Rhineland-Palatinate, in western Germany. It belongs to the association community of Aar-Einrich.

== Transport links ==
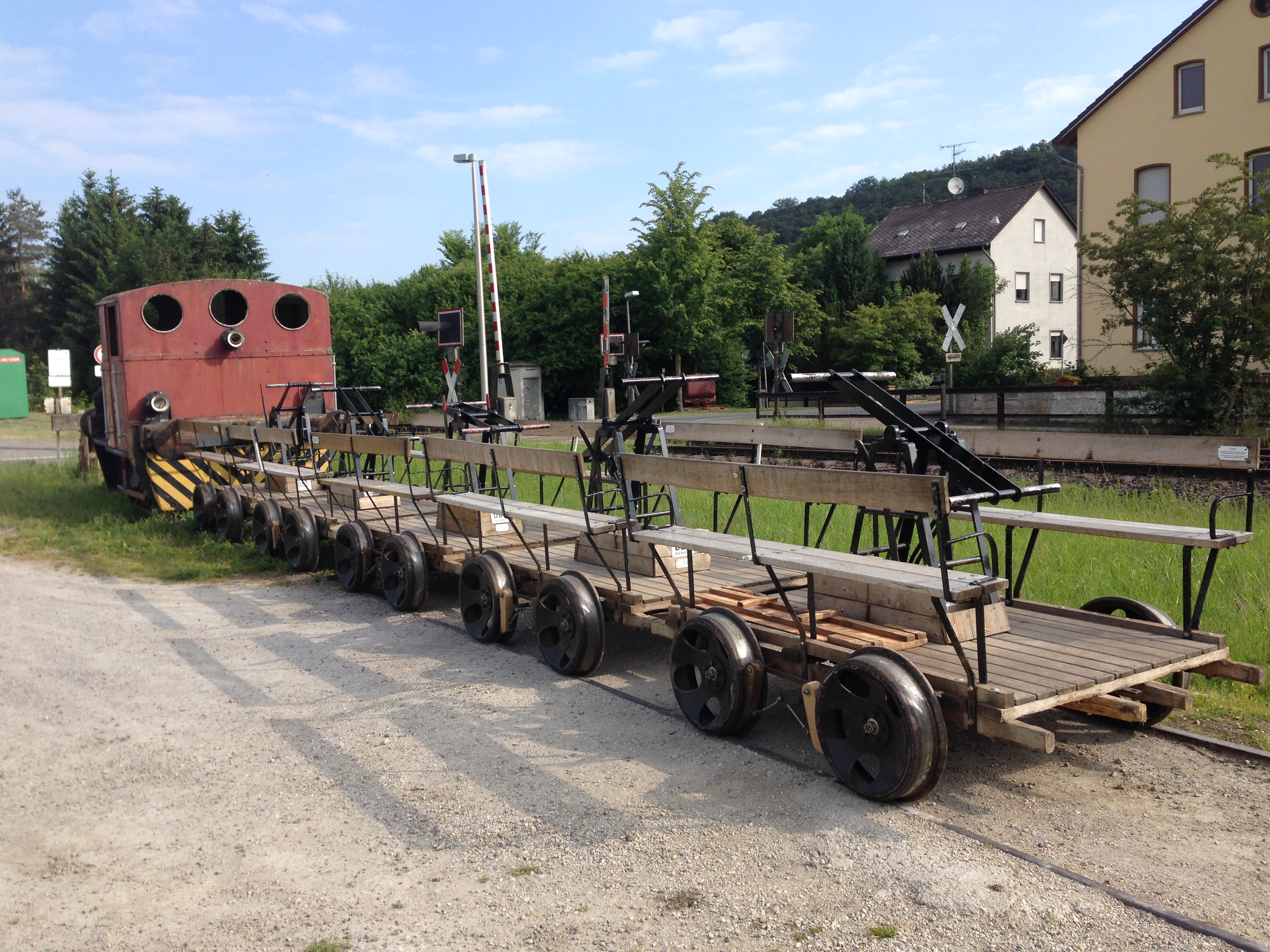
Former Oberneisen station

Until 1986 there was public transport on the Aar Valley Railway (Diez - Wiesbaden Hbf, the interest group Arbeitskreis Aartalbahn has the goal to conserve the line and uses it for railbike tours, base and depot are located at Oberneisen station.

Nowadays the nearest railway station is Diez at the Lahntal railway.

Oberneisen is connected to the local bus network and located in the zone number 522 of the transport association Verkehrsverbund Rhein-Mosel (VRM).

On the highway, close to Oberneisen, a local bus stop of the line number 570 (Limburg (Lahn) station - Diez - Holzheim - Hahnstätten - Zollhaus - Michelbach), is located, which primarily runs next to the tracks of the Aar Valley Railway.
