= Rettert =

- Municipality
- Coat of arms

- Location of Rettert within Rhein-Lahn-Kreis district
- Interactive map of Rettert
- Location within Germany Location within Rhineland-Palatinate
- Coordinates: 50°13′55″N 7°56′25″E
- Country: Germany
- State: Rhineland-Palatinate
- District: Rhein-Lahn-Kreis
- Municipal assoc.: Aar-Einrich

Government
  - Mayor (2019–24): Heiko Heymann

Area
  - Total: 5.80 km^{2} (2.24 sq mi)
- Elevation: 415 m (1,362 ft)

Population (2025-12-31)
  - Total: 453
  - Density: 78.1/km^{2} (202/sq mi)
- Time zone: UTC+01:00 (CET)
  - Summer (DST): UTC+02:00 (CEST)
- Postal codes: 56370
- Dialling codes: 06486
- Vehicle registration: EMS, DIZ, GOH
- Website: www.rettert.de

Rettert is a municipality in the district of Rhein-Lahn, in Rhineland-Palatinate, in western Germany. It belongs to the association community of Aar-Einrich.
