= Berndroth =

- Municipality
- Coat of arms

- Location of Berndroth within Rhein-Lahn-Kreis district
- Interactive map of Berndroth
- Location within Germany Location within Rhineland-Palatinate
- Coordinates: 50°14′14.56″N 7°58′6.74″E
- Country: Germany
- State: Rhineland-Palatinate
- District: Rhein-Lahn-Kreis
- Municipal assoc.: Aar-Einrich

Government
  - Mayor (2019–24): Rainer Hans Mohr

Area
  - Total: 6.22 km^{2} (2.40 sq mi)
- Elevation: 370 m (1,210 ft)

Population (2025-12-31)
  - Total: 415
  - Density: 66.7/km^{2} (173/sq mi)
- Time zone: UTC+01:00 (CET)
  - Summer (DST): UTC+02:00 (CEST)
- Postal codes: 56370
- Dialling codes: 06486
- Vehicle registration: EMS, DIZ, GOH

Berndroth is a municipality in the district of Rhein-Lahn, in Rhineland-Palatinate, in western Germany. It belongs to the association community of Aar-Einrich.
