= Allendorf, Rhein-Lahn =

Allendorf
- Municipality
- Coat of arms

- Location of Allendorf within Rhein-Lahn-Kreis district
- Interactive map of Allendorf
- Location within Germany Location within Rhineland-Palatinate
- Coordinates: 50°16′4.40″N 7°59′57.47″E
- Country: Germany
- State: Rhineland-Palatinate
- District: Rhein-Lahn-Kreis
- Municipal assoc.: Aar-Einrich

Government
  - Mayor (2019–24): Lars Denninghoff (SPD)

Area
  - Total: 3.03 km^{2} (1.17 sq mi)
- Elevation: 325 m (1,066 ft)

Population (2025-12-31)
  - Total: 593
  - Density: 196/km^{2} (507/sq mi)
- Time zone: UTC+01:00 (CET)
  - Summer (DST): UTC+02:00 (CEST)
- Postal codes: 56370
- Dialling codes: 06486
- Vehicle registration: EMS, DIZ, GOH

Allendorf (German: [ˈaləndɔʁf]) is a municipality in the district of Rhein-Lahn, in Rhineland-Palatinate, in western Germany. It belongs to the association community of Aar-Einrich.
