= Burgschwalbach =

- Municipality
- Coat of arms

- Location of Burgschwalbach within Rhein-Lahn-Kreis district
- Interactive map of Burgschwalbach
- Location within Germany Location within Rhineland-Palatinate
- Coordinates: 50°16′59.6″N 8°4′48.99″E
- Country: Germany
- State: Rhineland-Palatinate
- District: Rhein-Lahn-Kreis
- Municipal assoc.: Aar-Einrich

Government
  - Mayor (2019–24): Ehrenfried Bastian (SPD)

Area
  - Total: 9.21 km^{2} (3.56 sq mi)
- Elevation: 170 m (560 ft)

Population (2025-12-31)
  - Total: 1,068
  - Density: 116/km^{2} (300/sq mi)
- Time zone: UTC+01:00 (CET)
  - Summer (DST): UTC+02:00 (CEST)
- Postal codes: 65558
- Dialling codes: 06430
- Vehicle registration: EMS, DIZ, GOH
- Website: www.burgschwalbach.de

Burgschwalbach is a municipality in the district of Rhein-Lahn, in Rhineland-Palatinate, in western Germany. It belongs to the association community of Aar-Einrich.

The Schwalbach Castle was built between 1354 and 1371 by Count Eberhard V. of Katzenelnbogen. Gilbrecht of Schönborn was mentioned as the count's burgmann in 1373. In the 16th century, Burgschwalbach passed to the County of Nassau.
