= Katzenelnbogen =

- Town
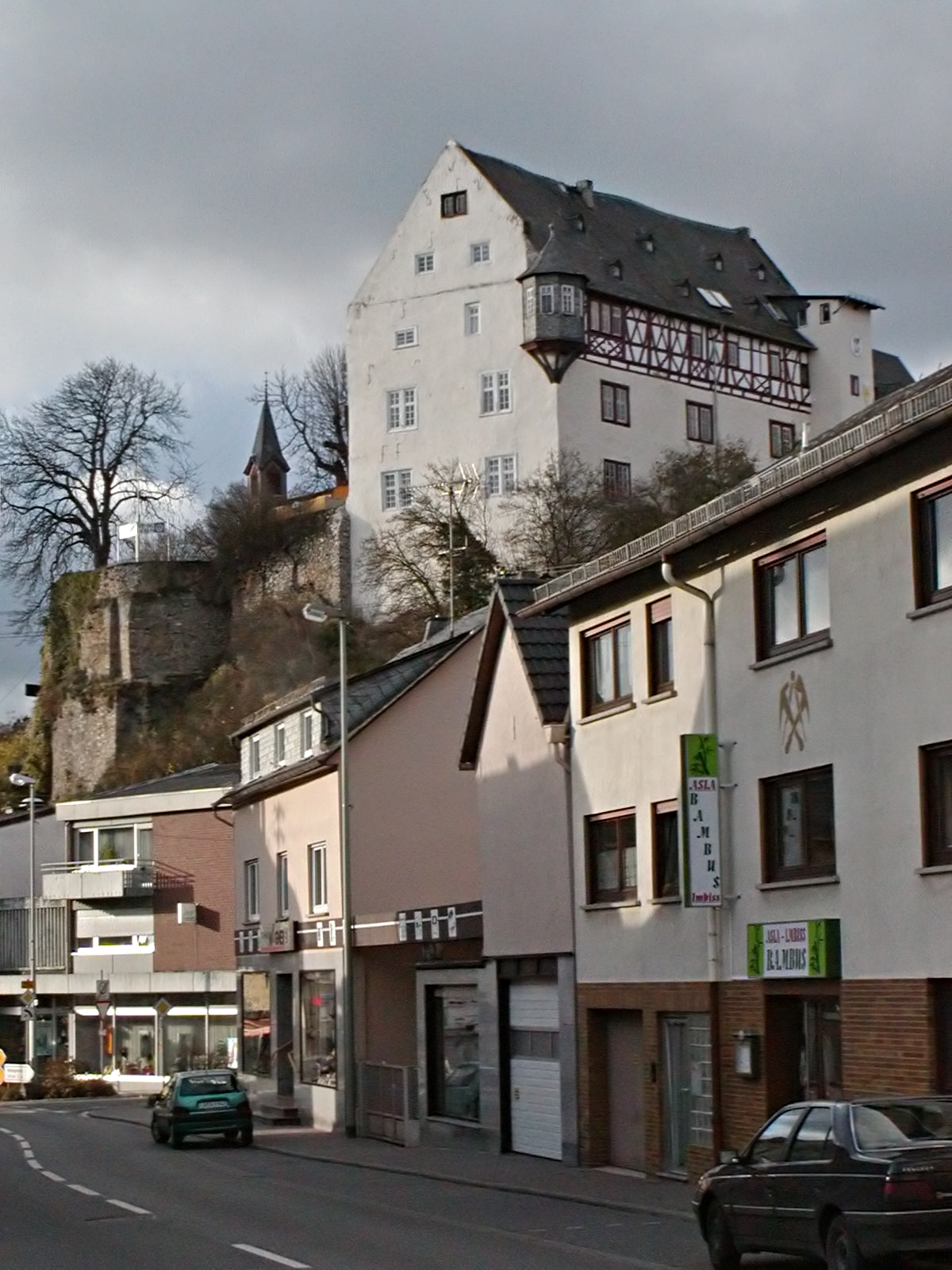

- Coat of arms

- Location of Katzenelnbogen within Rhein-Lahn-Kreis district
- Interactive map of Katzenelnbogen
- Location within Germany Location within Rhineland-Palatinate
- Coordinates: 50°16′N 7°59′E
- Country: Germany
- State: Rhineland-Palatinate
- District: Rhein-Lahn-Kreis
- Municipal assoc.: Aar-Einrich

Government
  - Mayor (2019–24): Petra Popp

Area
  - Total: 9.18 km^{2} (3.54 sq mi)
- Elevation: 280 m (920 ft)

Population (2025-12-31)
  - Total: 2,259
  - Density: 246/km^{2} (637/sq mi)
- Time zone: UTC+01:00 (CET)
  - Summer (DST): UTC+02:00 (CEST)
- Postal codes: 56368
- Dialling codes: 06486
- Vehicle registration: EMS, DIZ, GOH
- Website: www.vg-katzenelnbogen.de

Katzenelnbogen (German: [katsn̩ˈʔɛlnˌboːɡn̩]) is the name of a castle and small town in the district of Rhein-Lahn-Kreis in Rhineland-Palatinate, Germany. Katzenelnbogen is the seat of the Verbandsgemeinde ("collective municipality") Aar-Einrich.

== History ==
Katzenelnbogen originated as a castle built on a promontory over the river Lahn around 1095. The lords of the castle became important local magnates, acquiring during the centuries some key and highly lucrative customs rights on the Rhine. The Counts of Katzenelnbogen also built Burg Neukatzenelnbogen and Burg Rheinfels on the Rhine.

The male line of the German family died out in 1479, while the Austrian lineage continued, and the county became disputed between Hesse and Nassau. In 1557, the former finally won, but when Hesse was split due to the testament of Philipp the Magnanimous, Katzenelnbogen was split as well, between Hesse-Darmstadt and the small new secondary principality of Hesse-Rheinfels.

When the latter line expired in 1583, its property went to Hesse-Kassel (or Hesse-Cassel), which added the inherited part of Katzenelnbogen to its side-line principality of Hesse-Rotenburg. After the Congress of Vienna, this part of Katzenelnbogen was given to Nassau in exchange for property that had been taken away from it; after the War of 1866, with all Nassau, it became part of Prussia.

In 1945, Hesse-Darmstadt was united with most of the Prussian province of Hesse-Nassau, which included the former Hesse-Kassel along with Nassau and the formerly Free City of Frankfurt, to form the federal state of Hesse. Thus, Hesse now includes the larger part of former county of Katzenelnbogen.

A smaller part of Nassau, including the old castle and village bearing the name of Katzenelnbogen, ended up as part of Rhineland-Palatinate (part of the Rhein-Lahn and Westerwaldkreis districts). William III of England a Prince of Orange had the title Katzenelnbogen in his reign from 1689-1702 and today one of the titles of the King of the Netherlands (the House of Orange-Nassau) is that of Count of Katzenelnbogen.

== Etymology ==
In German, the name Katzenelnbogen literally translates as 'cat's elbow', which is arguably a later mondegreen. Historians have speculated that the name derives from Cattimelibocus, a combination of two words: the ancient Germanic tribal name of the Chatti and Melibokus The theory is based on the name Μηλίβοκον (Mēlíbokon), used by Ptolemy specifically for a mountain range farther east: the Harz, or the Thuringian Forest or both. Melibokon, in a Latinised form, would then be Melibocus or Melibokus. The fact that the name, in any recognisable form, first appears in medieval documents also suggests that it has no older Roman origin.

== History of wine ==
In the history of wine, Katzenelnbogen is famous for the first documentation of Riesling grapes in the world: this was in 1435, when the storage inventory of Count John IV of Katzenelnbogen, a member of the Holy Roman high nobility, lists the purchase of vines of "Rieslingen".

== See also ==
- Katznelson surname
