= Schiesheim =

- Municipality
- Coat of arms

- Location of Schiesheim within Rhein-Lahn-Kreis district
- Interactive map of Schiesheim
- Location within Germany Location within Rhineland-Palatinate
- Coordinates: 50°16′38″N 8°3′21″E
- Country: Germany
- State: Rhineland-Palatinate
- District: Rhein-Lahn-Kreis
- Municipal assoc.: Aar-Einrich

Government
  - Mayor (2019–24): Norbert Fey

Area
  - Total: 1.43 km^{2} (0.55 sq mi)
- Elevation: 160 m (520 ft)

Population (2025-12-31)
  - Total: 269
  - Density: 188/km^{2} (487/sq mi)
- Time zone: UTC+01:00 (CET)
  - Summer (DST): UTC+02:00 (CEST)
- Postal codes: 65623
- Dialling codes: 06430
- Vehicle registration: EMS, DIZ, GOH

Schiesheim (German pronunciation: [ˈʃiːshaɪm]) is a municipality in the district of Rhein-Lahn, in Rhineland-Palatinate, in western Germany. It belongs to the association community of Aar-Einrich.
