= Hesse-Rheinfels =

Countship

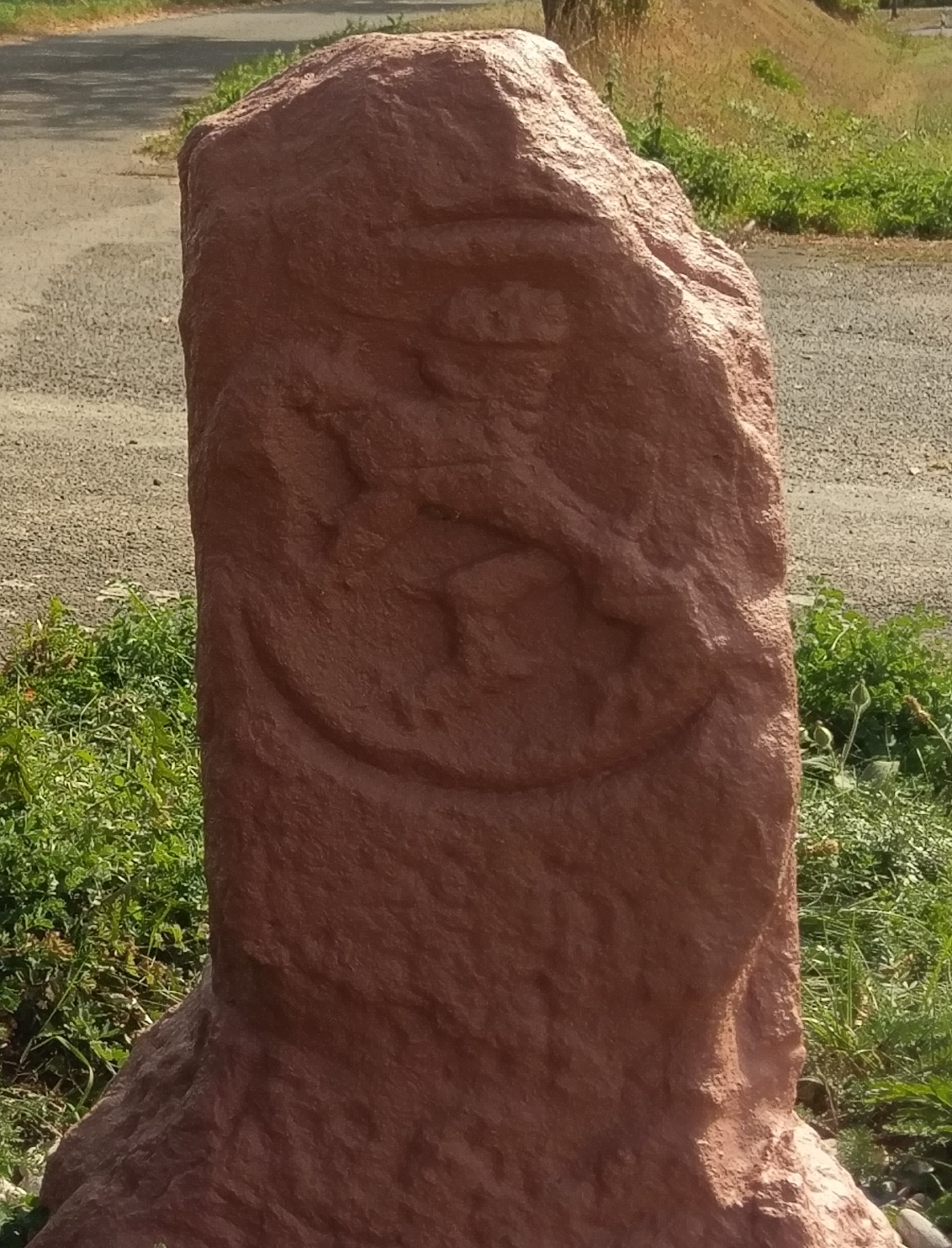
Coat of arms of Hessen-Rheinfels carved on the boundary stone between Weisel and Bornich

Hesse-Rheinfels was created as a cadet line of Hesse for Philip II, Landgrave of Hesse-Rheinfels (1541–1583), landgrave from 1567 until 1583, and as a cadet line of Hesse-Kassel for Ernest, Landgrave of Hesse-Rheinfels (1623–1693), landgrave from 1627 until 1658.

== First creation ==
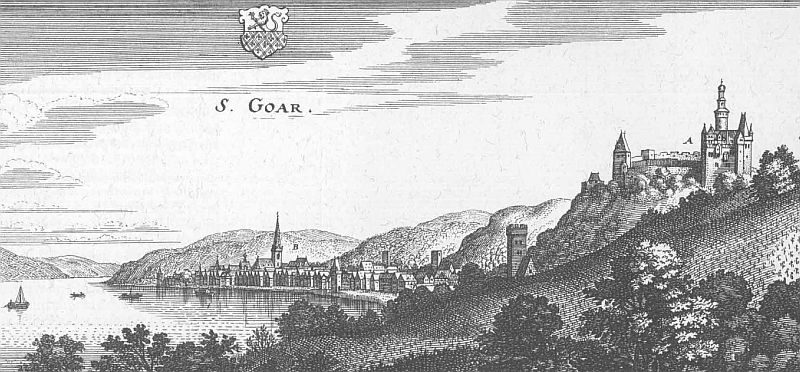
Sankt Goar on the Rhine and Rheinfels Castle (1655)

Philip was the third son of Philip the Magnanimous, Landgrave of Hesse and Christine of Saxony (1505–1549). After his father's death in 1567, the Landgraviate of Hesse was divided among the four sons of his first marriage. Philip the younger received a portion of about an eighth of his father's territories, mainly the former Lower County of Katzenelnbogen with its four Ämter Rheinfels (with the city of St. Goar and the residence Rheinfels Castle) on the left bank of the Rhine, and Braubach, Reichenberg and Hohenstein on the right bank.

== Second creation ==
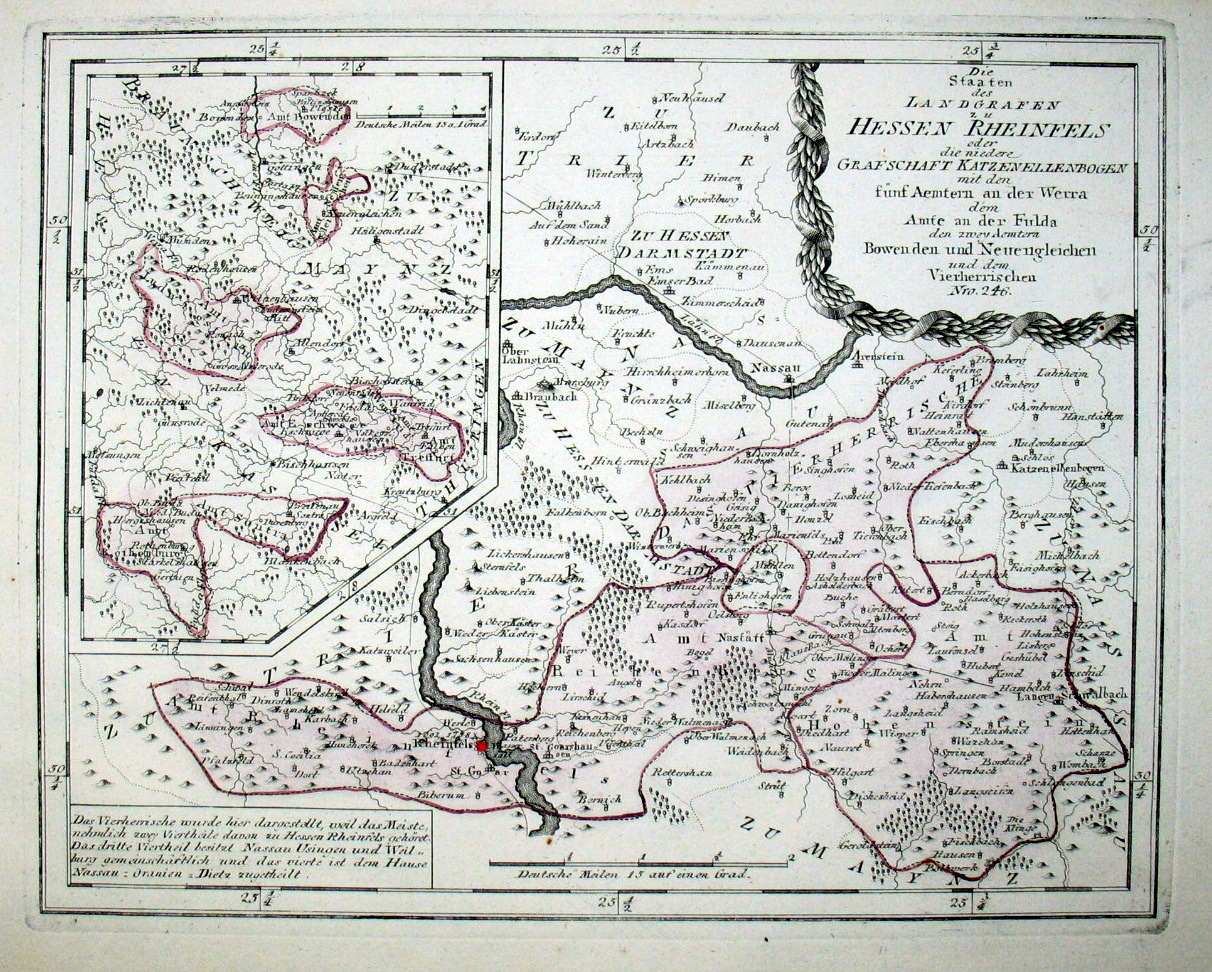
Territories of Hesse-Rheinfels, 1794

Maurice the Learned (1572–1632) was Landgrave of Hesse-Kassel from 1592 until 1627. Maurice turned to Calvinism in 1605, became involved later in the Thirty Years' War, and, after being forced to cede some of his territories to the Darmstadt line, abdicated in 1627 in favour of his son William V (1602–1637), his younger sons receiving apanages which created several cadet lines of the house (Hesse-Rotenburg, Hesse-Eschwege and Hesse-Rheinfels), of which, with amalgamation, that of Hesse-Rheinfels-Rotenburg survived till 1834.

In 1627 Ernest (1623–1693), a younger son of Maurice, Landgrave of Hesse-Kassel, received Rheinfels and lower Katzenelnbogen as his inheritance, and some years later, on the deaths of two of his brothers, Friedrich, Landgrave of Hesse-Eschwege (1617–1655) and Herman, Landgrave of Hesse-Rotenburg (1607–1658), he added Eschwege, Rotenburg, Wanfried and other districts to his possessions.
