= Braubach (disambiguation) =

Braubach is a municipality in Rhineland-Palatinate, Germany.

Braubach may also refer to:

- Braubach (Verbandsgemeinde), a former Verbandsgemeinde in Rhineland-Palatinate, Germany, its seat was in Braubach
- Braubach-Loreley, the former name of the Verbandsgemeinde Loreley in Rhineland-Palatinate, Germany
- Braubach (Liederbach), a river of Hesse, Germany, tributary of the Liederbach
- John of Hesse-Braubach (1609-1651), German nobleman and general
