= Schwedenschanze =

Ringworks in central Europe

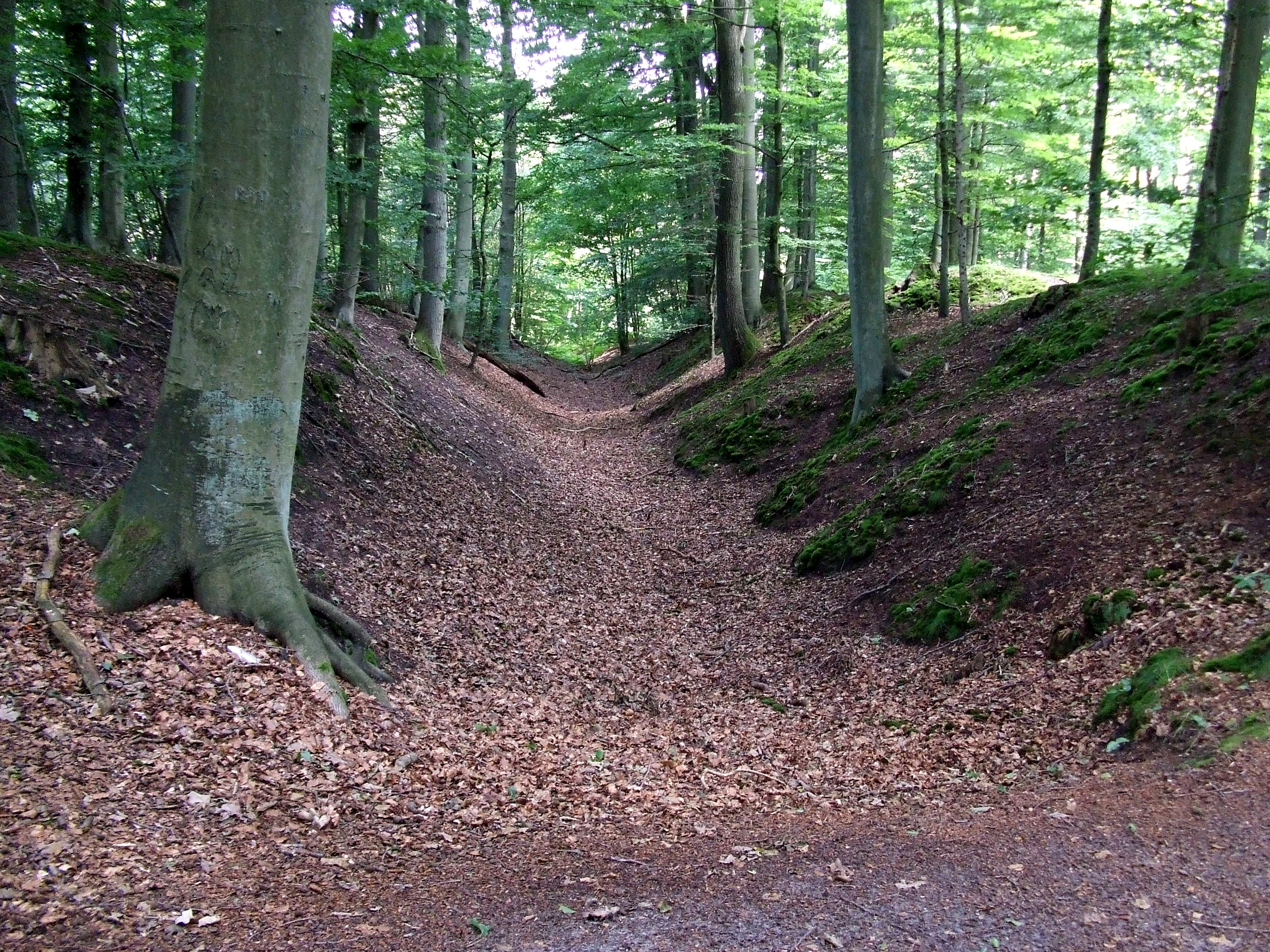
A Schwedenschanze in Lübeck Forest, Lauerholz

There are numerous prehistorical and early historical ringworks and fortification ramparts in Central Europe that have erroneously, usually colloquially, been given the name Schwedenschanze, which means "Swedish redoubt", a schanze being a hastily erected, military fieldwork.

== History ==
This name arose in connexion with the fighting during the Thirty Years' War, when the population of the Holy Roman Empire often used old field fortifications as refuge castles or hidden livestock pens. Particularly in Catholic areas this action was taken to protect people from the Protestant forces of the Swedish king, Gustavus II Adolphus. Whether the individual fortifications were actually used as fighting positions, however, is usually speculative. Many of the often well preserved earthworks in the forests of Europe were probably later associated wrongly with this religious war.

The history of these heritage sites often goes back several thousand years. They were frequently extended during the Early Middle Ages, for example, to defend East Francia and other regions in the 10th century from the Hungarian invasions.

It is true that in the 17th century, during the Thirty Years' War, numerous earthworks and schanzen were thrown up during the conflict. But these are clearly distinguishable from the older sites by their regular, geometric shapes. Occasionally there were also fortifications that were actually built by the Imperial Army or the Catholic League that were later called Schwedenschanzen; such as the Schwedenschanze in the Rhön.

== Schwedenschanzen ==
=== Austria ===
From west to east:

- Schwedenschanze (Lochau) in Lochau, Vorarlberg
- Schwedenschanze (Oberhaag) near Aigen-Schlägl, Upper Austria
- Schwedenschanze (Bad Leonfelden) near Bad Leonfelden, Upper Austria
- Schwedenschanze (Achatzberg) near Klam, Upper Austria
- Schwedenschanze (Engelstein) near Großschönau, Lower Austria
- Schwedenschanze (Buschberg) in the Leiser Berge, Lower Austria

=== Czech Republic ===
- Švédské šance (Horní Moštěnice)
- Švédské šance (Kovářská)

=== Germany ===
- Schwedenschanze (Altastenberg) near Altastenberg, North Rhine-Westphalia
- Schwedenschanze (Belm) near Belm, Lower Saxony
- Schwedenwälle or Schwedenschanzen between Brandenburg an der Havel and Brielow
- Schwedenschanze in Buckow (Rietz-Neuendorf), near Beeskow, Brandenburg
- Turmhügel Schwedenschanze (Burghaig), county of Kulmbach, Bavaria
- Turmhügel Schwedenschanze (Kulmbach), county of Kulmbach, Bavaria
- Schwedenschanze (Canstein) near Marsberg-Canstein im Roten Land, North Rhine-Westphalia
- Schwedenschanze (Deesbach) near Neuhaus am Rennweg in the Thuringian Forest
- Schwedenschanze (Delitzsch) am Neuhäuser See, Saxony
- Schwedenschanze (Dornberg) near Bielefeld-Dornberg, North Rhine-Westphalia
- Schwedenschanze (Dörscheid) near Dörscheid, Rhineland-Palatinate
- Ringwall Schwedenschanze (Elfershausen) near Elfershausen in Lower Franconia, Bavaria
- Schwedenschanze (Elmshorn) im Liether Wald in Elmshorn, Schleswig-Holstein
- Schwedenschanze (Frickingen) near Frickingen, Baden-Württemberg
- Schwedenschanze (Gersfeld) near Rodenbach in the Rhön near the Reesberg, Hesse
- Schwedenschanze (Gotha) near Gotha in Thuringia
- Schwedenschanze in the Dölauer Heide in Halle (Saale), Saxony-Anhalt
- Schwedenschanze (Haßberge) on the Kamm der Haßberge, Bavaria
- Ringwall Schwedenschanze (Heiligenstadt in Oberfranken) northwest of Heiligenstadt in Oberfranken, Bavaria
- Schwedenschanze (Höchstadt an der Aisch) in Höchstadt an der Aisch, Bavaria
- Schwedenschanze (Höhbeck) in the Elbtalaue Wendland Nature Park, Lower Saxony
- Schwedenschanze Isingerode near Isingerode, Lower Saxony
- Schwedenschanze (Kelsterbach) in Kelsterbach, Hesse
- Schwedenschanze (Klein Hutbergen) near Verden (Aller), Lower Saxony
- Schwedenschanze (Lossow) near Frankfurt (Oder), Brandenburg
- Schwedenschanze (Neppermin) in Neppermin on Usedom, see Burgwall Neppermin, Mecklenburg-Western Pomerania
- Schwedenschanze (Nisselsbach) near Aichach, Bavaria
- Abschnittsbefestigung Schwedenschanze (Oberlangheim), Bavaria
- Schwedenschanze (Peenemünde) in Peenemünde on Usedom, Mecklenburg-Western Pomerania
- Schwedenschanze (Pohnsdorf) near Pohnsdorf, Schleswig-Holstein
- Ringwall Schwedenschanze (Kützberg) near Poppenhausen, Bavaria
- Schwedenschanze (Preußisch Oldendorf) near Preußisch Oldendorf-Börninghausen on the Egge, North Rhine-Westphalia
- Schwedenschanze (Rohrhardsberg) on the Rohrhardsberg, Baden-Württemberg
- Ringwall Schwedenschanze (Rottenstein Forest), Hofheim in Lower Franconia in the county of Haßberge in Bavaria
- Schwedenschanze (Schlangen) near Schlangen-Oesterholz, North Rhine-Westphalia
- Schwedenschanze (Spessart) near Alzenau northwest of Mömbris, Bavaria
- Schwedenschanze (Stade) in the Stade village of Groß Thun, Lower Saxony
- Schwedenschanze (Stralsund) near Stralsund, Mecklenburg-Western Pomerania
- Schwedenschanze (Teublitz) in Teublitz, Bavaria
- Schwedenschanze (Vlotho) in Vlotho, North Rhine-Westphalia
- Schwedenschanze (Weitenhagen) in Weitenhagen, Mecklenburg-Western Pomerania
- Schwedenschanze (Zuflucht) in the Northern Black Forest

=== Poland ===
- Ciepłe
- Stare Bielsko
- Weklice

=== Switzerland ===
- Schwedenschanze (Beggingen) on the Randen (mountain), Beggingen, canton of Schaffhausen

== See also ==
- Redoubt
- Schwedendamm near Wolfenbüttel
- Ringwall Schwedenschanze
- Burgstall Schwedenschanze
