= Braubach (Verbandsgemeinde) =

Coordinates: 50.267°N 7.650°E

Braubach is a former Verbandsgemeinde ("collective municipality") in the Rhein-Lahn-Kreis, in Rhineland-Palatinate, Germany. Its seat was in Braubach. On 1 July 2012, it merged with the Verbandsgemeinde Loreley.

The Verbandsgemeinde Braubach consisted of the following Ortsgemeinden ("local municipalities"):

1. Braubach
2. Dachsenhausen
3. Filsen
4. Kamp-Bornhofen
5. Osterspai
