= Schanzenkopf =

Schanzenkopf may refer to:

- Schanzenkopf (Schwedenschanze), a wooded hill of Bavaria, Germany
- Schanzenkopf (Spessart), a wooded hill of Bavaria, Germany
