= Hohe Mark (Spessart) =

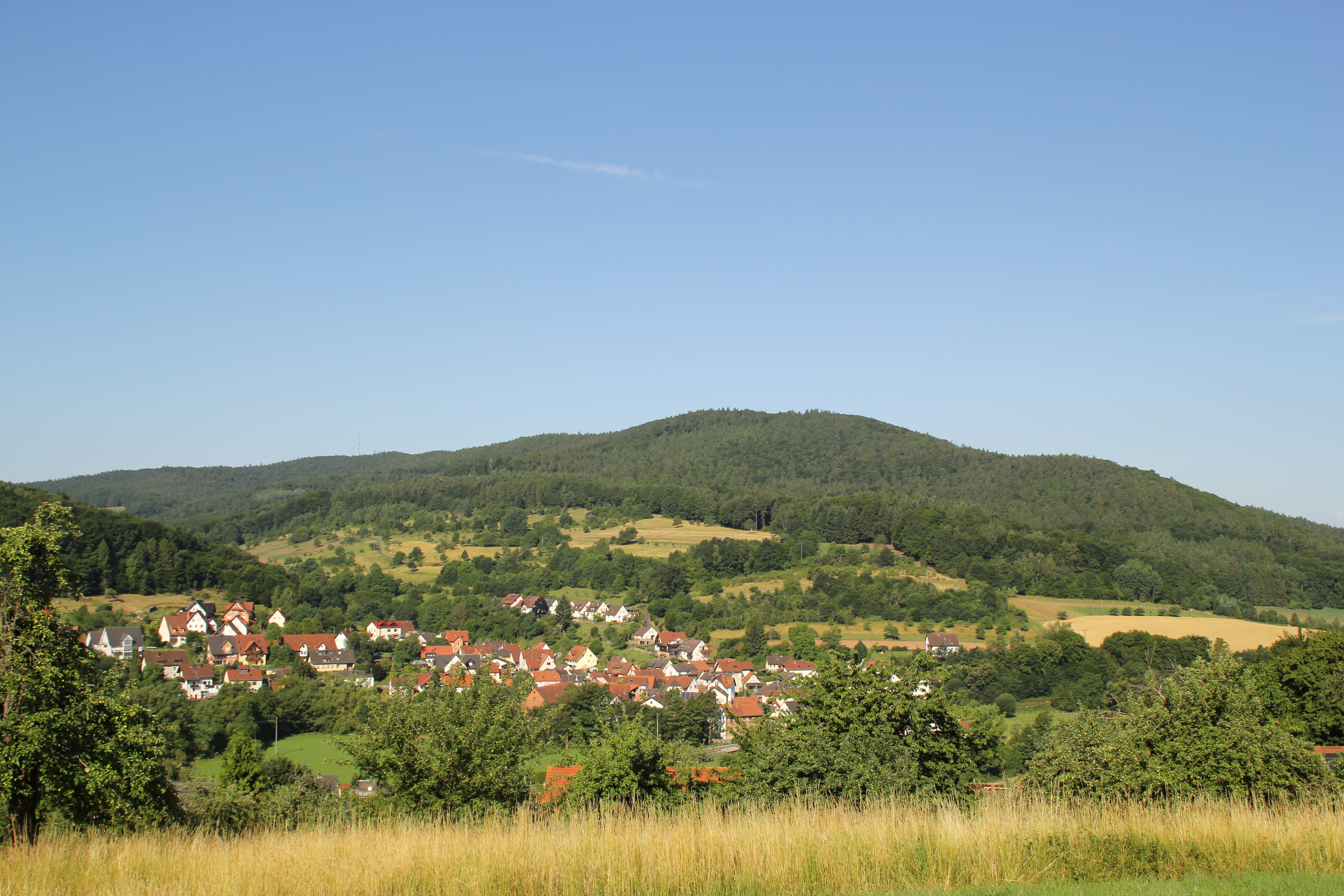
- Hohe Mark (centre) with the main peak of Hahnenkamm ridge in the back

Highest point
- Elevation: 414 m (1,358 ft)
- Coordinates: 50°05′13″N 9°07′24″E

Geography
- Location within Bavaria
- Location: Bavaria, Germany
- Parent range: Spessart

Hohe Mark (Spessart) is a wooded hill of Bavaria, Germany. It is part of the Mittelgebirge Spessart and lies in the district of Aschaffenburg, near Alzenau.

Hohe Mark has an elevation of up to 414 metres (1,358 ft) and is located just to the northeast of the highest point of the Hahnenkamm ridge.
