= Prath =

Prath may refer to:

- The Syriac name of the Euphrates river
- Prath, Germany
