= Ciepłe, Pomeranian Voivodeship =

Village in Pomeranian Voivodeship, Poland

Ciepłe
- Village
- Location within Poland
- Coordinates: 53°51′15″N 18°50′29″E
- Country: Poland
- Voivodeship: Pomeranian
- County: Tczew
- Gmina: Gniew
- Population: 339
- Time zone: UTC+1 (CET)
  - Summer (DST): UTC+2 (CEST)
- Vehicle registration: GTC

Ciepłe [ˈt͡ɕɛpwɛ] (German: Warmhof) is a village in the administrative district of Gmina Gniew, within Tczew County, Pomeranian Voivodeship, in northern Poland. Ciepłe is located in the ethnocultural region of Kociewie in the historic region of Pomerania.

== History ==
Ciepłe was an early medieval settlement complex in Pomerania, associated with the expansion of the Piast state in the 10th–11th centuries. The site comprises three gord, three settlements, and two cemeteries, situated along the Vistula river.

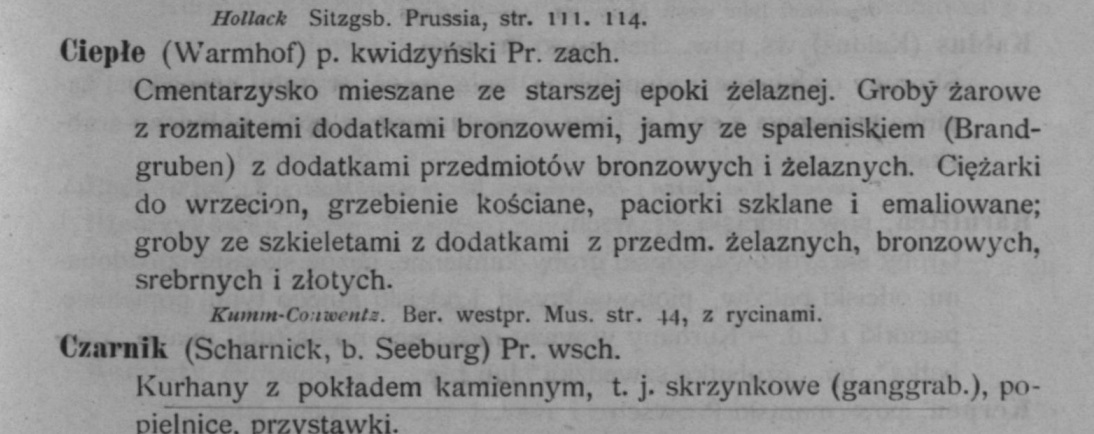
Details of archaeological discoveries from Ciepłe in an edition of Światowid, 1899.

The archaeological history of the locality was discovered in 1900, when six chamber graves were uncovered, including the richly furnished Grave V, initially interpreted as Viking. Excavations between 2004 and 2014 revealed further elite burials, comparable to those at Bodzia, Dziekanowice, and Kałdus, and linked to funerary practices of Scandinavian origin.

A new interdisciplinary research project launched in 2023 (Wczesnośredniowieczny kompleks osadniczy w Ciepłem. Piastowski klucz do Pomorza Wschodniego, financed by the National Science Centre) confirmed the strategic and political importance of Ciepłe in the incorporation of Pomerania into the early Piast state. Excavations and surveys have dated the foundation of the main stronghold (Ciepłe 3) to the late 10th century (980s–990s). Chamber graves were also documented in the second cemetery, making Ciepłe the first known site in the Vistula basin with such burials in two separate cemeteries.

During the Polish–Swedish War, the area of Ciepłe became part of the wider theatre of operations connected with the Battle of Gniew. Archaeological excavations carried out in 2023–2024 uncovered traces of a Schwedenschanze, field fortifications constructed on the remnants of the early medieval stronghold. Finds included musket balls, a bullet mould, and human remains of at least six individuals, radiocarbon dated to the early 17th century. These discoveries, together with Swedish military maps, confirm that the site was reused during the conflict between the Polish–Lithuanian Commonwealth and Sweden under Gustavus Adolphus. The evidence links Ciepłe directly to the events surrounding the Battle of Gniew, shedding new light on the military history of the Vistula region.
