= Weyer, Germany =

Weyer
- Municipality
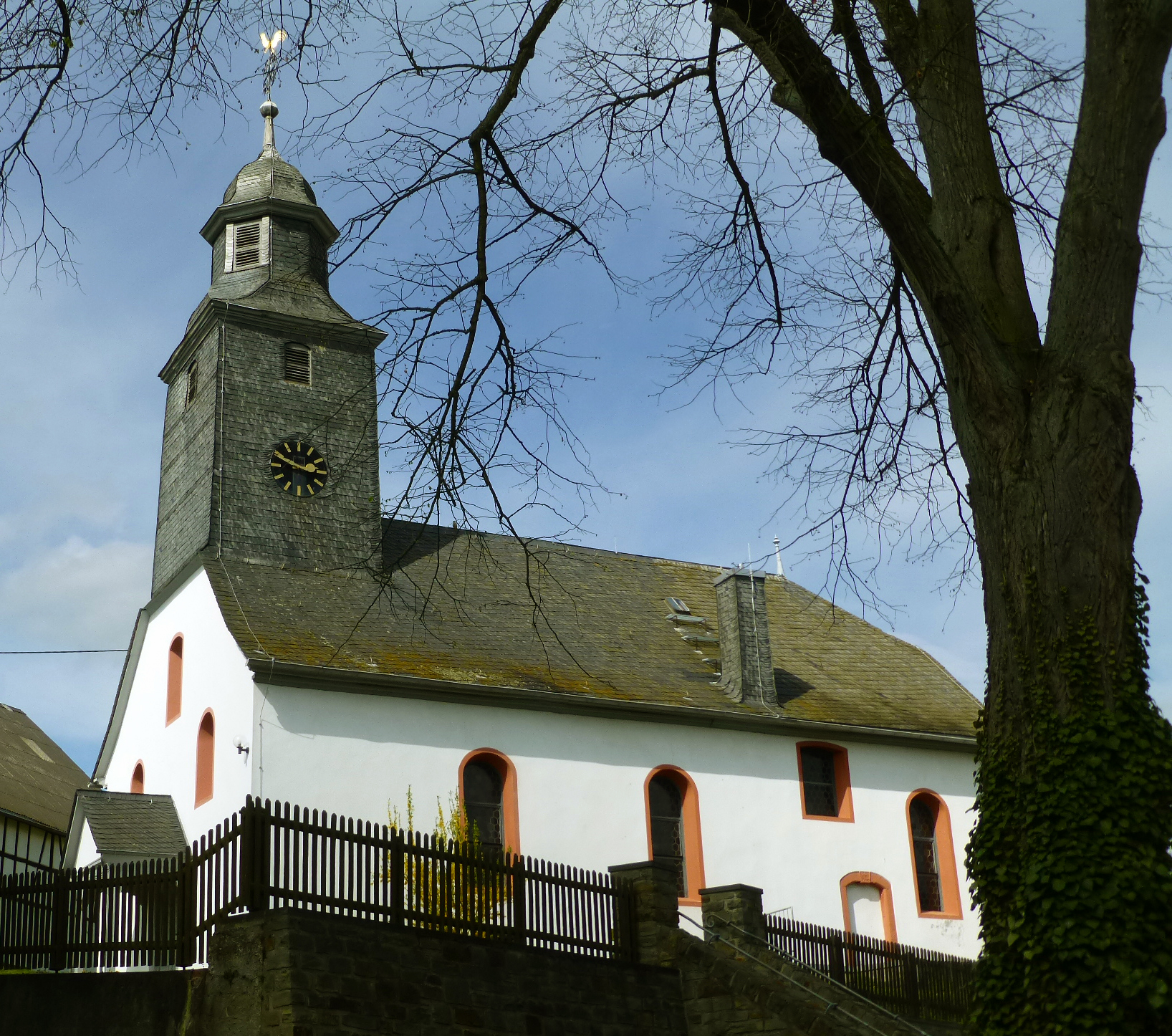

- Coat of arms

- Location of Weyer within Rhein-Lahn-Kreis district
- Interactive map of Weyer
- Location within Germany Location within Rhineland-Palatinate
- Coordinates: 50°11′47″N 7°43′31″E
- Country: Germany
- State: Rhineland-Palatinate
- District: Rhein-Lahn-Kreis
- Municipal assoc.: Loreley

Government
  - Mayor (2019–24): Ilona Bröder-Wagner

Area
  - Total: 5.99 km^{2} (2.31 sq mi)
- Elevation: 280 m (920 ft)

Population (2025-12-31)
  - Total: 470
  - Density: 78/km^{2} (200/sq mi)
- Time zone: UTC+01:00 (CET)
  - Summer (DST): UTC+02:00 (CEST)
- Postal codes: 56357
- Dialling codes: 06771
- Vehicle registration: EMS, DIZ, GOH

Weyer (German pronunciation: [ˈvaɪɐ]) is a municipality in the district of Rhein-Lahn, in Rhineland-Palatinate, in western Germany.
