= Lierschied =

- Municipality
- Coat of arms

- Location of Lierschied within Rhein-Lahn-Kreis district
- Interactive map of Lierschied
- Location within Germany Location within Rhineland-Palatinate
- Coordinates: 50°10′17″N 7°44′49″E
- Country: Germany
- State: Rhineland-Palatinate
- District: Rhein-Lahn-Kreis
- Municipal assoc.: Loreley

Government
  - Mayor (2019–24): Manfred Baumert

Area
  - Total: 5.95 km^{2} (2.30 sq mi)
- Elevation: 250 m (820 ft)

Population (2025-12-31)
  - Total: 475
  - Density: 79.8/km^{2} (207/sq mi)
- Time zone: UTC+01:00 (CET)
  - Summer (DST): UTC+02:00 (CEST)
- Postal codes: 56357
- Dialling codes: 06771
- Vehicle registration: EMS, DIZ, GOH
- Website: www.lierschied.de

Lierschied (German pronunciation: [ˈliːɐ̯ʃiːt]) is a municipality in the district of Rhein-Lahn, in Rhineland-Palatinate, of western Germany.

On the minicipality edge there is a spring called Die Wäsch.
