= Kestert =

- Municipality
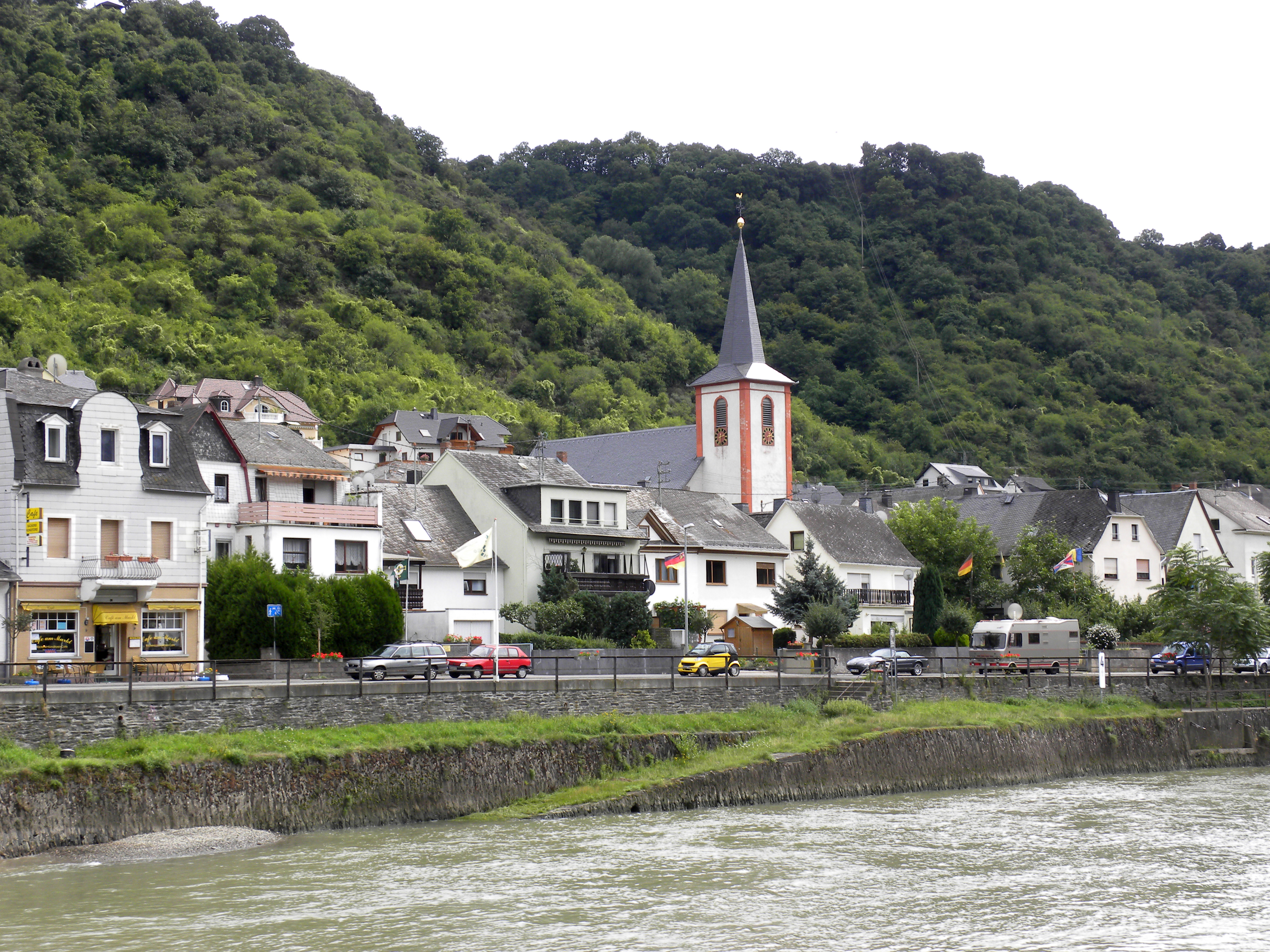

- Coat of arms

- Location of Kestert within Rhein-Lahn-Kreis district
- Interactive map of Kestert
- Location within Germany Location within Rhineland-Palatinate
- Coordinates: 50°11′08″N 7°39′00″E
- Country: Germany
- State: Rhineland-Palatinate
- District: Rhein-Lahn-Kreis
- Municipal assoc.: Loreley

Government
  - Mayor (2019–24): Uwe Schwarz

Area
  - Total: 6.90 km^{2} (2.66 sq mi)
- Elevation: 70 m (230 ft)

Population (2025-12-31)
  - Total: 635
  - Density: 92.0/km^{2} (238/sq mi)
- Time zone: UTC+01:00 (CET)
  - Summer (DST): UTC+02:00 (CEST)
- Postal codes: 56348
- Dialling codes: 06773
- Vehicle registration: EMS, DIZ, GOH

Kestert (formerly Kester) is a municipality in the district of Rhein-Lahn, in Rhineland-Palatinate, in western Germany.
