= Reitzenhain =

- Municipality
- Coat of arms

- Location of Reitzenhain within Rhein-Lahn-Kreis district
- Interactive map of Reitzenhain
- Location within Germany Location within Rhineland-Palatinate
- Coordinates: 50°9′20″N 7°47′12″E
- Country: Germany
- State: Rhineland-Palatinate
- District: Rhein-Lahn-Kreis
- Municipal assoc.: Loreley

Government
  - Mayor (2019–24): Rüdiger Geisel

Area
  - Total: 5.66 km^{2} (2.19 sq mi)
- Elevation: 300 m (980 ft)

Population (2025-12-31)
  - Total: 346
  - Density: 61.1/km^{2} (158/sq mi)
- Time zone: UTC+01:00 (CET)
  - Summer (DST): UTC+02:00 (CEST)
- Postal codes: 56357
- Dialling codes: 06771
- Vehicle registration: EMS, DIZ, GOH
- Website: www.vgloreley.de

Reitzenhain is a municipality in the district of Rhein-Lahn, in Rhineland-Palatinate, in western Germany.
