= Battle of Gniew =

Battle of the 1626 Polish-Swedish war

- Part of the Polish–Swedish War (1626–1629)
| Date | September 22 – October 1, 1626 |
| Location | Gniew (Mewe), Poland 53°50′00″N 18°50′00″E |
| Result | Swedish victory |

Belligerents
| Swedish Empire | Polish–Lithuanian Commonwealth |

Commanders and leaders
| Gustavus Adolphus | Sigismund III Vasa |

Strength
| 22 September: 1,700 cavalry 8,150 infantry – 74 guns 29 September: 12,100 men (10,000 infantry, 2,100 cavalry) | 22 September: 6,780 cavalry 4,430 infantry – 20 guns 29 September: 14,500 men (mainly cavalry) |

Casualties and losses
| Polish claim: 22 September – 360–500 dead 29 September losses were about equal to those of the Poles 1 October – 30 dead | 22 September 13–50 dead 29 September 18–43 dead Swedish claim: 1 October – 500 dead |

The Battle of Gniew or the Battle of Mewe was fought during the Polish–Swedish War (1626–1629), between Sweden and the Polish–Lithuanian Commonwealth from 22 September with initial skirmishes, to the main battle of October 1, 1626. Both the Swedish and Polish army were commanded by their kings – Gustavus Adolphus of Sweden and Sigismund III Vasa. The battle ended indecisively. However, Polish and Swedish armies had different objectives. Sigismund Vasa wanted to protect Gdańsk from besieging. Gustav had to protect Gniew, which was important for the prestige of his army. The battle ended in a Swedish victory.

== Prelude ==
After the seizure of Livonia on July 6, 1626, Swedish troops landed in the strength of about 13,000 men and 80 guns, in Piława at the port of Duke of Prussia George Wilhelm who was at the time vassal of the Polish king but also a brother in law of the king of Sweden. Piława did not offer any resistance. which together with the subsequent activity of Prussian soldiers and the attitude of George William, formed the basis of treason accusations leveled at them by the Poles. The Swedes set off on a rapid march from Piława in the southwest direction, against the Vistula, taking several small towns along the way, as well as the second largest city of Royal Prussia, Elbląg. Newly landing troops also took Puck, as well as several other towns and the crossing of the Vistula — Tczew, Gniew, and Głowa Gdańska. The remaining and most serious obstacle was Gdańsk. Gdańsk was a big urban center which at that time had more than 64,000 inhabitants (about four times that of Stockholm, the capital of Sweden). Initially the Swedes tried to negotiate with the city but these were soon broken off due to the unyielding attitude of Gdańsk's inhabitants. Feeling threatened, the citizens of Gdańsk begged the Polish king for help. It then became crucial for the main Polish army to make its way to Royal Prussia. The mobilization in Poland, given existing conditions, ran smoothly; despite being low on funds, Sigismund managed to raise an army in a little more than two months. The Polish king and his army (6780 cavalry, 4430 infantry, 20 guns) then rushed to help the city.

== Battle ==
Gustavus Adolphus, who had 8,150 infantry, 1,700 cavalry and 74 guns, tried to create a base of operations in order to attack Gdansk. For this purpose the Swedes began construction of a bridge over the Vistula leading to Wielkie Żuławy. Receiving the news of the siege of Gniew by Sigismund III, Gustav moved to rescue the town which was defended by 200 men, and on his way took Walichnowy, on September 11. Sigismund III Vasa, besieging the city, moved his forces to the north, near Ciepłe, and then took positions on a steep bank. Gniew was of great strategic value for the Swedes, who needed the town to cover the flank of Tczew, where great portions of men were being assembled.

=== September 22 ===
Gustavus Adolphus took the initiative on September 22. With a force consisting of 2,000 infantry and 1,200 cavalry, he started his march from Walichnów in the direction of Gniew under the cover of flood embankments along the bank of the Vistula. In order to scout out Polish entrenchments he led 900 men (30% of his force), and soon the two sides met. The fighting surged back and forth; winged hussars attacked the German reiters under the command of Heinrich von Thurn who fled into the woods, but were later repulsed by the Swedish infantry, and due to the fact that the area was traversed by ditches which made it difficult for the hussars to charge. The Poles then sent infantry and three squadrons of light cavalry to the left wing of the Swedes and forced them out of the flood embankments of which they captured. At the same time two regiments of light cavalry struck the Swedes' flank and scattered them. However, Gustavus rounded up the remainder of his forces and managed to repel the attacking Poles, whom in their rout rode over their own infantry lines.

A cease fire took place the next day while both sides buried their dead, although during the skirmish both sides suffered only light casualties. Between 13 and 50 Poles died. Swedish losses were higher. Poles counted 360-500 Swedish killed on the battlefield.

=== September 29 ===
The fighting on the next day took place on two separate areas, one near the village of Gronowo where the Swedish troops had positioned themselves behind fortifications. Poles tried to provoke the Swedes into leaving their advantageous positions. However, as there were only 200 of them, the Swedish commander General Muschamp refused. After initial engagements Polish infantry attacked the Swedish positions but were held back by the musketeers. After two hours of fighting the Poles received further infantry reinforcements and the Swedes began to retreat, which encouraged the Poles to send in a cavalry charge, composed of two squadrons of hussars and 400 reiters. The Swedes counterattacked with fresh cavalry units but were beaten back, so was the Polish charge which collapsed after suffering significant casualties by the Swedish infantry and cannon fire, as well as by the difficult terrain they had to get through. The Polish artillery which sequentially had bombarded against the village had been rather ineffective; mainly due to the inaccurate fire which had gone mainly over the Swedish positions. In the meantime, the Poles launched another assault on General Von Thurn's regiment who had camped on the previous fighting ground of September 22, but the Poles were beaten back.

During this day, Gustavus had learned that Swedish infantry could beat back the renowned Polish cavalry, if fought during rather protected circumstances. The Poles had suffered no great loss, around 18–43 were dead. Swedish losses were about equal to those of the Poles.

=== October 1 ===
On October 1, the last and main event of the battle took place. The previous day passed quietly; both sides only strengthened their defensive positions. Swedes built a fort and entrenchments near the dam so they could shoot Polish cavalry who tried to go down to the plain under the hills. In this way Gustavus Adolphus could cover his troops, which were planned to enter into the Vistula corridor. On the night of September 30 to October 1, one of the Swedish soldiers in the garrison of Gniew managed to sneak out of the town and inform Gustavus Adolphus about the terrible situation where the besieged crew started to suffer for water because it had been cut off. Gustavus Adolphus decided to make an attempt to break through to the city. The Swedish plan was simple; Gustavus intended to distract the Poles from the main direction of impact and break through to Gniew. The main attack was to go down by the corridor along the Vistula and binding fight were to take place un the fields between the Gronowo and the Polish hills.

The plan was simple but its implementation went poorly. With about 4,000 men, the Swedes launched the attack on 1 October. Barely in the field under Gronowo, the Swedes began to emerge but were attacked by a Polish reiter squadron. A sixfold reiter charge disincentived the Swedes to stay in the field and they retreated back to the entrenchments. The diverted attention of the Poles from the Vistula corridor had failed. But Gustavus Adolphus did not abandon his plan to break through to Gniew. In another attack along the Vistula corridor, the Swedes once again were beaten back during a long violent struggle against some newly built Polish entrenchments, guarding across the corridor and blocking the way to Gniew. However, it was not the end of the battle.

Gustavus Adolphus then executed a massive assault and ordered his infantry to approach on the Polish positions on the hills. The Swedes marched through the bushes, in addition, hid behind branches, and later with a fierce assault, entered the hill and killed the Polish soldiers positioned there. They were, however, immediately fired at by another Polish regiment a distance away, whereof they began digging entrenchments to initiate a Polish counter assault. — The point of entry was chosen very well, bushes and branches provided a hidden entrance to the hill where the Poles had not dug any entrenchments. After some struggle, the remaining Polish infantry and riders on the hill were beaten back and started to rout. The Poles then carried out a counter assault consisting of hussars, which managed to drive the first line of the Swedes from the hill, but was later repulsed by the second line. The Polish cavalry retreated in disorder and the Swedes re-entered and continued their digging of entrenchments. Polish infantry renewed an attack on the Swedes which lasted for about two hours, hence the Poles had to retreat due to the lack of gunpowder. On the night of October 1, the Poles set fire to the farm Ciepłe. Taking advantage of the darkness, the Poles later left their entrenchments of the corridor, and the siege was then finally lifted. Gustavus then reinforced the castle garrison and boats were sent in with stocks. Neither side moved against each other and the battle ended.

The Swedish losses that day were counted to 30 men killed. The Polish casualties were higher, with about 500 dead and three standards lost. Sigismund then marched against Gdańsk to protect it from returning to the Swedes and the opportunity to obtain the gunpowder.

== Aftermath ==
Although the Swedish army had lifted the Polish siege of Gniew and Sigismund had withdrawn from the field, he still achieved progress and the upper hand to block the city of Gdańsk from Swedish troops before their arrival. Therefore, the withdrawal has to be considered somewhat tactical in purpose for the strategical overview. The battle of Mewe marked the first time Swedish infantry had successfully stood their ground against Polish hussars, even though being behind entrenchments it was an achievement for Gustavus Swedish infantry whose accurate and devastating fire had proved to be the decisive factor of the battle. He fell ill in October, thus the great assault on Gdańsk Gustavus had desired couldn't be executed, and the pursuit of Sigismund couldn't take place.

== Notes ==
=== Bibliography ===
- Radziwiłł, Albrycht Stanisław (1848). Edward Kotłubaj (ed.). "Rys panowania Zygmunta III". Athenaeum (in Polish). V.
- Żurkowski, Stanisław (1860). Żywot Tomasza Zamojskiego kanclerza wielkiego koronnego. opr. Aleksander Batowski (in Polish). Lwów.
- "Diariusz Woyny Pruskiey w Roku 1626 przeciw Gustawowi Xiązeciu Szwedzkiemu Sudermanskie", AGAD, dz. 48 nr 300, 53.
