= Weisel =

- Municipality
- Coat of arms

- Location of Weisel within Rhein-Lahn-Kreis district
- Interactive map of Weisel
- Location within Germany Location within Rhineland-Palatinate
- Coordinates: 50°07′12″N 07°48′05″E
- Country: Germany
- State: Rhineland-Palatinate
- District: Rhein-Lahn-Kreis
- Municipal assoc.: Loreley

Government
  - Mayor (2019–24): Peter Schmelzeisen

Area
  - Total: 13.06 km^{2} (5.04 sq mi)
- Elevation: 395 m (1,296 ft)

Population (2025-12-31)
  - Total: 1,016
  - Density: 77.79/km^{2} (201.5/sq mi)
- Time zone: UTC+01:00 (CET)
  - Summer (DST): UTC+02:00 (CEST)
- Postal codes: 56348
- Dialling codes: 06774
- Vehicle registration: EMS, DIZ, GOH
- Website: www.weisel.info

Weisel (German pronunciation: [ˈvaɪzl̩]) is a municipality in the district of Rhein-Lahn, in Rhineland-Palatinate, in western Germany.

== Historical overview ==
Weisel was first mentioned as Wizzelo in 1128 in a deed of donation from Mainz Archbishop Adalbert I for the benefit of the Mainz Cathedral Chapter. However, the place may have existed much earlier, as the financial income now transferred came from Wezilo, who was Archbishop of Mainz from 1084 to 1088. A Roman burial mound discovered near the village in 1991 suggests that the area was already settled in Roman times.

The medieval settlement, along with Dörscheid and Kaub, belonged to the Lords of Falkenstein until Louis II of the Palatinate bought it from them in 1277 and 1289.

In 1372, Elector Ruprecht I burned the place down in a feud. The plague that raged in 1597 and 1613 wiped out almost the entire village. From 1620 to 1649 the owners changed several times; the rectory alone was looted three times and the school and tithe barn were burned down. On December 2, 1802, after more than 500 years, Weisel's membership in the Electoral Palatinate ended as it was dissolved. Large fires had struck the village several times. In 1810, such a catastrophe reduced 63 buildings (this was half of the village) to rubble. The last major village fires were to follow from 1872 to 1883.
