= Spessart-Gymnasium Alzenau =

Gymnasium school in Alzenau, Germany

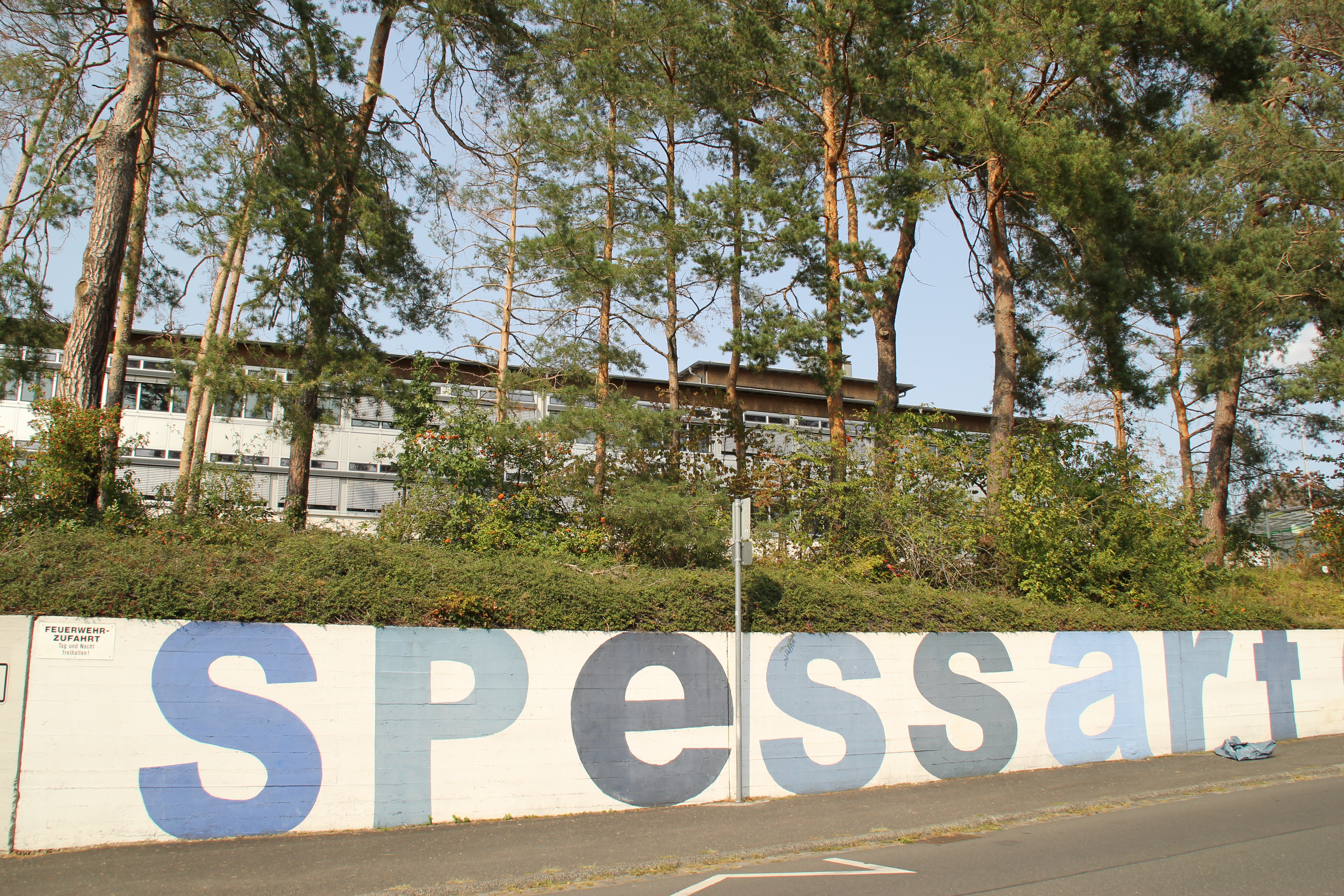

Location
- Brentanostraße 55; Alzenau, Aschaffenburg (district), Bavaria, 63755; Germany
- 50°05′31″N 9°04′15″E

Information
- School type: Gymnasium
- Founded: 1962
- Principal: Carlo Ribeca
- Staff: 83
- Gender: Coeducational
- Enrolment: 1086 (2022/23)
- Website: spessart-gymnasium.de

The Spessart-Gymnasium Alzenau (or SGA) is a public scientific-technological, linguistic and humanistic gymnasium in Alzenau, Bavaria. It is named after the Spessart, a wooded range of hills which stretches about 60 kilometers east of the town.

The gymnasium was founded 1962 to address the need for higher education in the prospering area. It was renovated and expanded in the late 1990s and now has a stationary telescope.

== Afternoon care ==
The school offers afternoon care with appropriately trained pedagogical professionals from the Albert-Schweitzer-Familienwerk Bayern. The students can eat warm food at the cafeteria, the afternoon care ends at 4 pm.

== Student exchange programs ==
The Spessart-Gymnasium participates in student exchange programs with partner schools in Finland, Poland, France and Italy.

== Awards ==
- In 2017, the school joined the "Fairtrade-Schools" campaign.
- Since 2018, the school is a member of "Schule ohne Rassismus – Schule mit Courage", a program that fights discrimination and racism.
- In 2023, it received the title "Klimaschule Bronze" for special commitment in fighting climate change.
