= Dachsenhausen =

- Municipality
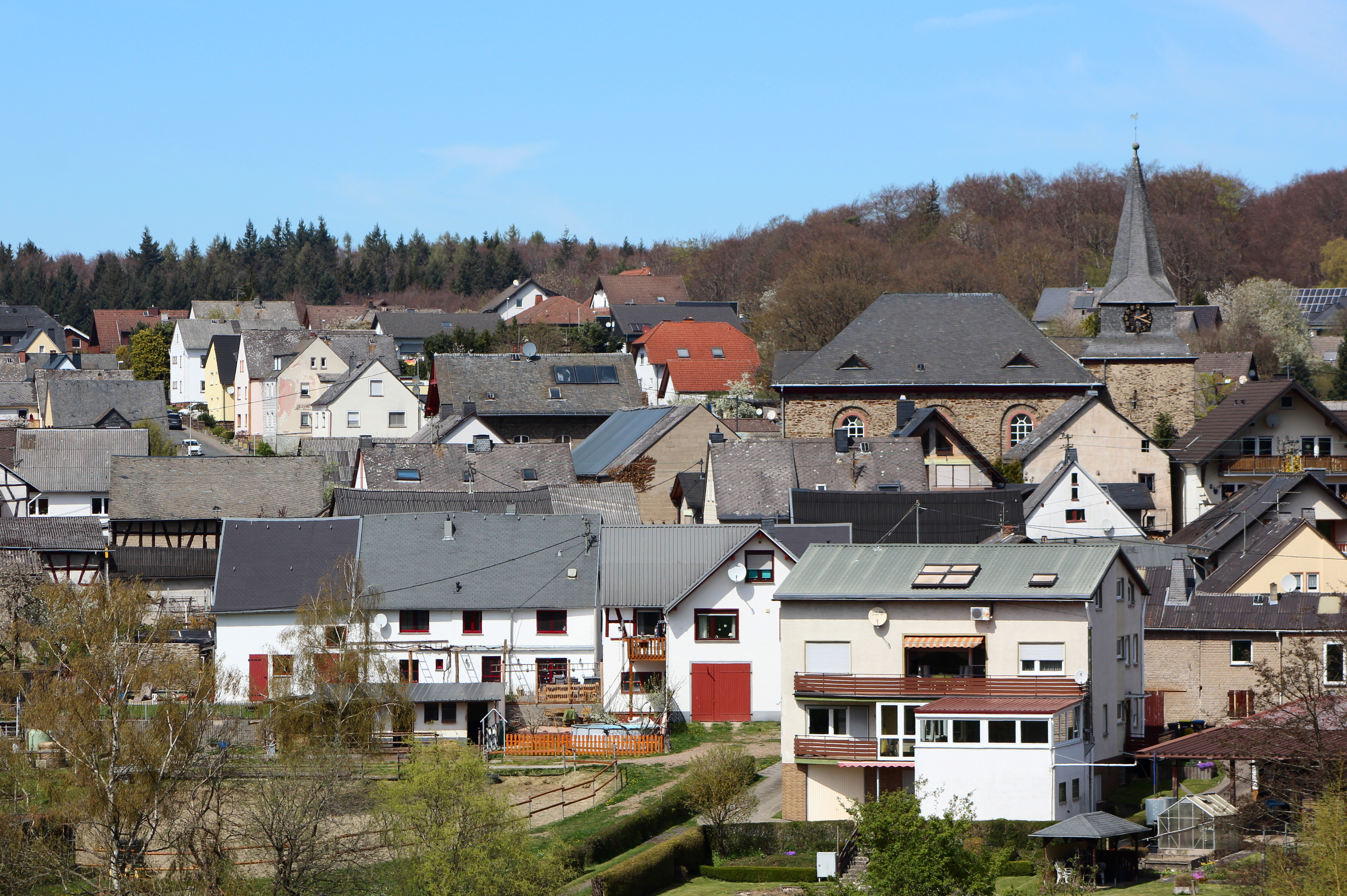

- Coat of arms

- Location of Dachsenhausen within Rhein-Lahn-Kreis district
- Interactive map of Dachsenhausen
- Location within Germany Location within Rhineland-Palatinate
- Coordinates: 50°15′15.37″N 7°43′36.34″E
- Country: Germany
- State: Rhineland-Palatinate
- District: Rhein-Lahn-Kreis
- Municipal assoc.: Loreley

Government
  - Mayor (2019–24): Mathias Schaefer

Area
  - Total: 10.17 km^{2} (3.93 sq mi)
- Elevation: 380 m (1,250 ft)

Population (2025-12-31)
  - Total: 959
  - Density: 94.3/km^{2} (244/sq mi)
- Time zone: UTC+01:00 (CET)
  - Summer (DST): UTC+02:00 (CEST)
- Postal codes: 56340
- Dialling codes: 06776
- Vehicle registration: EMS, DIZ, GOH
- Website: www.dachsenhausen.de

Dachsenhausen is a municipality in the district of Rhein-Lahn, in Rhineland-Palatinate, in western Germany.
