= Reichenberg, Rhineland-Palatinate =

Reichenberg
- Municipality
- Coat of arms

- Location of Reichenberg within Rhein-Lahn-Kreis district
- Interactive map of Reichenberg
- Location within Germany Location within Rhineland-Palatinate
- Coordinates: 50°09′31″N 7°45′35″E
- Country: Germany
- State: Rhineland-Palatinate
- District: Rhein-Lahn-Kreis
- Municipal assoc.: Loreley

Government
  - Mayor (2019–24): Karl Heinz Goerke

Area
  - Total: 3.23 km^{2} (1.25 sq mi)
- Elevation: 190 m (620 ft)

Population (2025-12-31)
  - Total: 167
  - Density: 51.7/km^{2} (134/sq mi)
- Time zone: UTC+01:00 (CET)
  - Summer (DST): UTC+02:00 (CEST)
- Postal codes: 56357
- Dialling codes: 06771
- Vehicle registration: EMS, DIZ, GOH
- Website: www.reichenberg-rlp.de

Reichenberg (German pronunciation: [ˈʁaɪçn̩ˌbɛʁk]) is a municipality in the district of Rhein-Lahn, in Rhineland-Palatinate, in western Germany.

== Geography ==
Reichenberg is situated near the famous Loreley rock and lies approximately 2 km east of the river Rhine in the section known as the Rhine Gorge. The small village belongs to the UNESCO World Heritage Upper Middle Rhine Valley.
