= Osterspai =

- Municipality
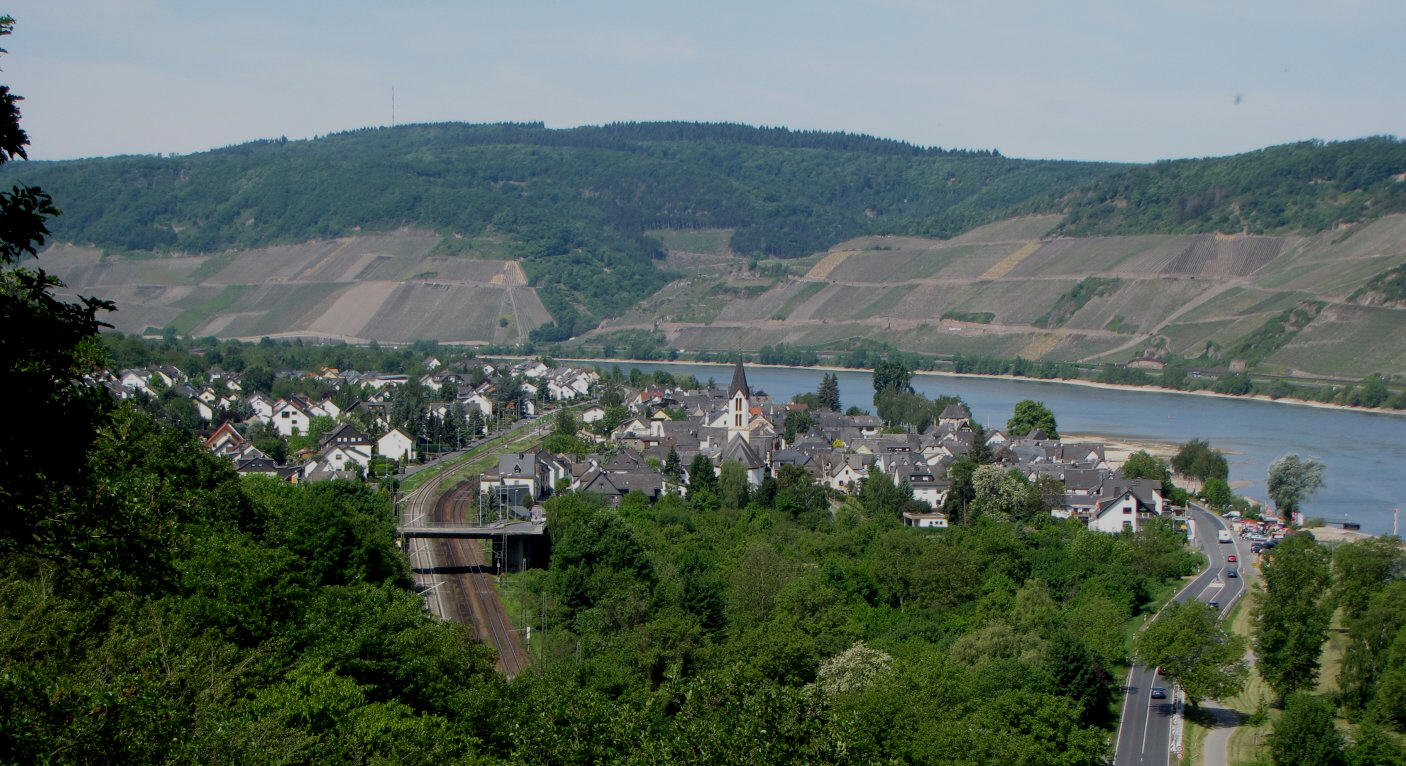

- Coat of arms

- Location of Osterspai within Rhein-Lahn-Kreis district
- Interactive map of Osterspai
- Location within Germany Location within Rhineland-Palatinate
- Coordinates: 50°14′44″N 7°36′58″E
- Country: Germany
- State: Rhineland-Palatinate
- District: Rhein-Lahn-Kreis
- Municipal assoc.: Loreley

Government
  - Mayor (2019–24): Thomas Maier (SPD)

Area
  - Total: 13.00 km^{2} (5.02 sq mi)
- Elevation: 65 m (213 ft)

Population (2025-12-31)
  - Total: 1,243
  - Density: 95.62/km^{2} (247.6/sq mi)
- Time zone: UTC+01:00 (CET)
  - Summer (DST): UTC+02:00 (CEST)
- Postal codes: 56340
- Dialling codes: 02627
- Vehicle registration: EMS, DIZ, GOH
- Website: www.osterspai.de

Osterspai (formerly Osterspey) is a municipality in the district of Rhein-Lahn, in Rhineland-Palatinate, in western Germany.
