= Hahnenkamm (Spessart) =

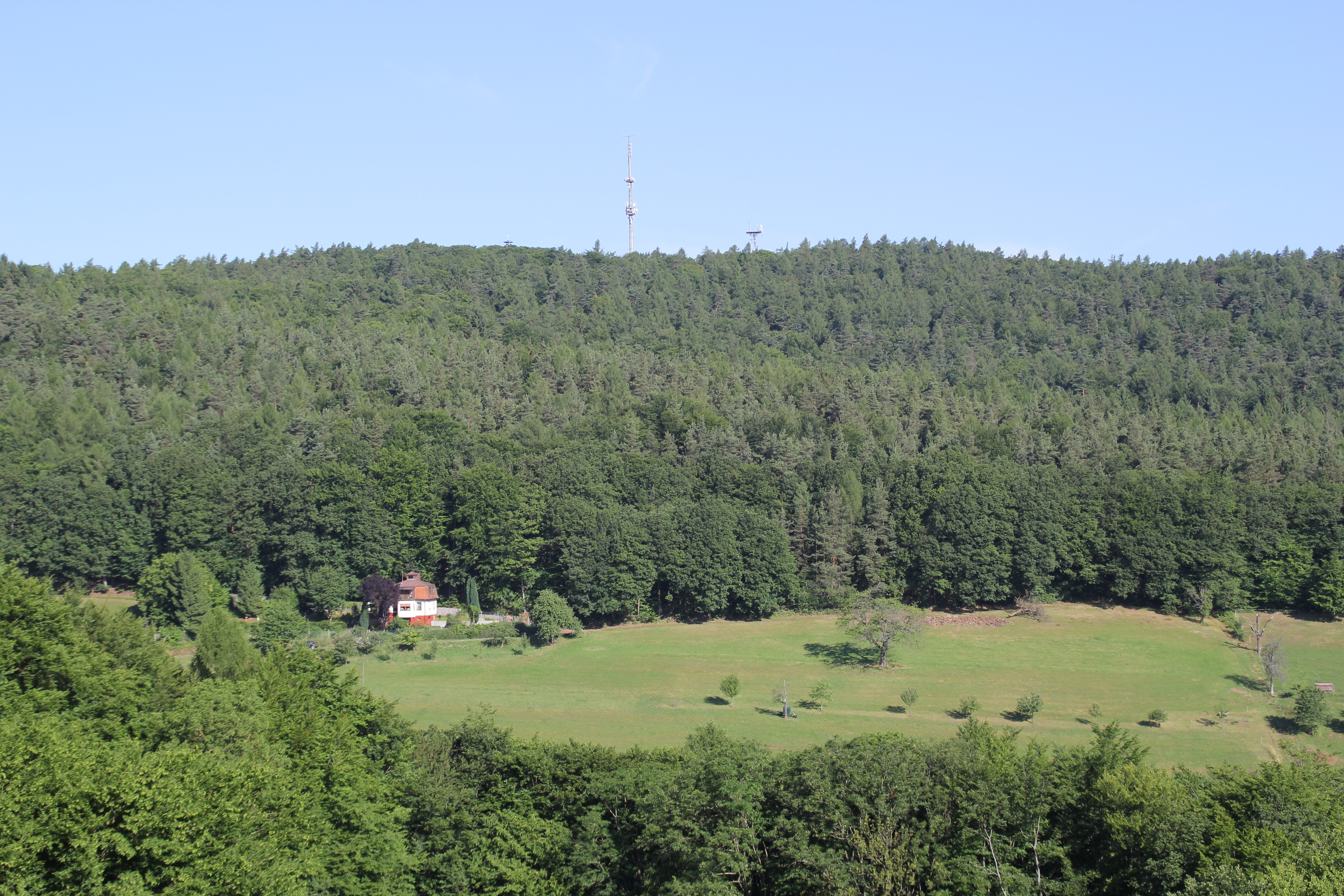
- View of the ridge's highest peak from Hemsbach

Highest point
- Elevation: 435.5 m (1,429 ft)
- Coordinates: 50°4′42″N 9°6′34″E

Geography
- Location within Bavaria
- Location: Bavaria, Germany
- Parent range: Spessart

Hahnenkamm (Spessart) is a ridge of hills in the northwest of the Spessart range of Bavaria, Germany. It has an elevation of up to 435.5 m above NHN.

== Geography ==
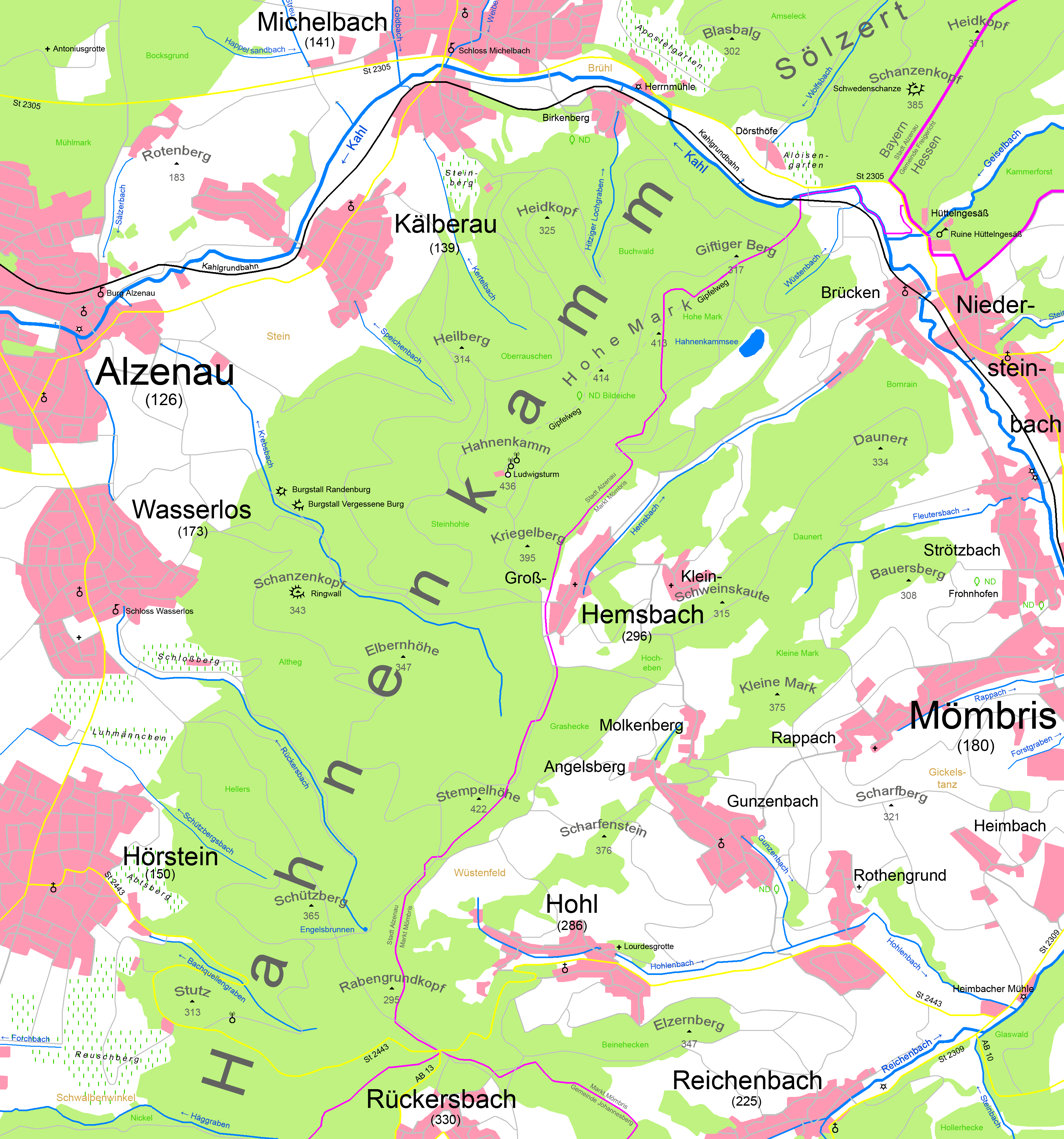
Map of the ridge Hahnenkamm

=== Location ===
Hahnenkamm lies east of Alzenau in the district of Aschaffenburg in the far northwest of the state of Bavaria. It is part of the Mittelgebirge Spessart (more precisely the Vorspessart) and is located between the Kahlgrund, the valley of the river Kahl, and the Untermainsenke, the valley of the river Main. To the north, the Hahnenkamm is delimited by the river Kahl, to the south by the Häggraben.

Schanzenkopf is part of the Hahnenkamm.

== Etymology ==
Hahnenkamm means rooster's comb in German. The name likely derives from the ridge's quite small width (for a Mittelgebirge) and the blocks of quartzite sticking up out of it.
