= Schanzenkopf (Spessart) =

Mountain in Germany

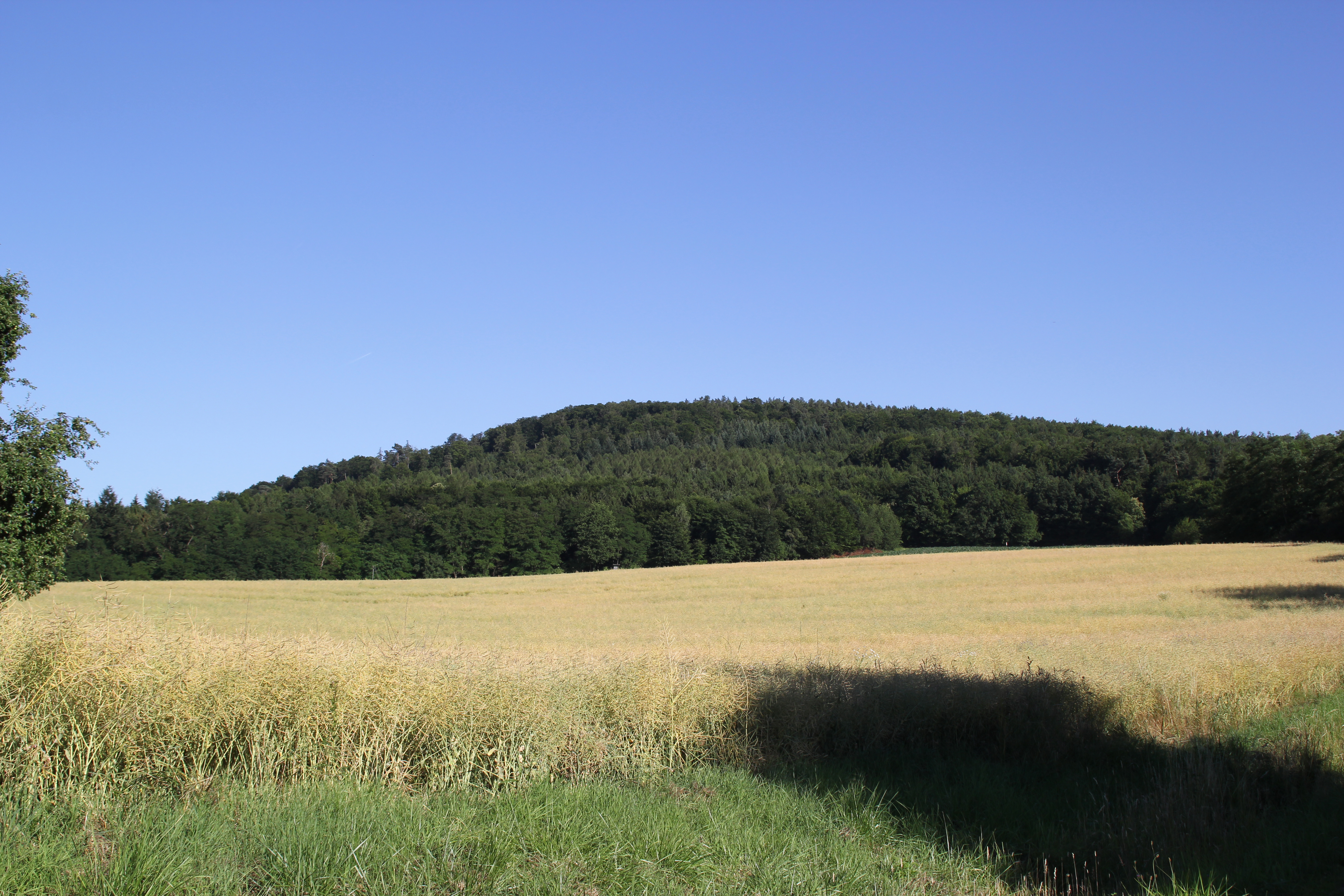
- Schanzenkopf above Alzenau

Highest point
- Elevation: 343 m (1,125 ft)
- Coordinates: 50°04′15″N 9°05′31″E

Geography
- Location within Bavaria
- Location: Bavaria, Germany
- Parent range: Spessart

Schanzenkopf (Spessart) is a wooded hill of Bavaria, Germany. It lies in the Mittelgebirge Spessart in the district of Aschaffenburg.

Schanzenkopf has a maximum elevation of 343 metres. It is located in the municipal territory of Alzenau and is part of the ridge Hahnenkamm, the highest elevation of which lies just to the northeast of Schanzenkopf.

There is another hill named Schanzenkopf (also known as Schwedenschanze) not far to the northeast, on the other side of the Kahl.

The remains of a hillfort have been discovered on Schanzenkopf (Schanze is German for fieldwork or rampart). However, it is unclear whether it dates from prehistoric or medieval times.
