= Schanzenkopf (Schwedenschanze) =

Mountain in Germany

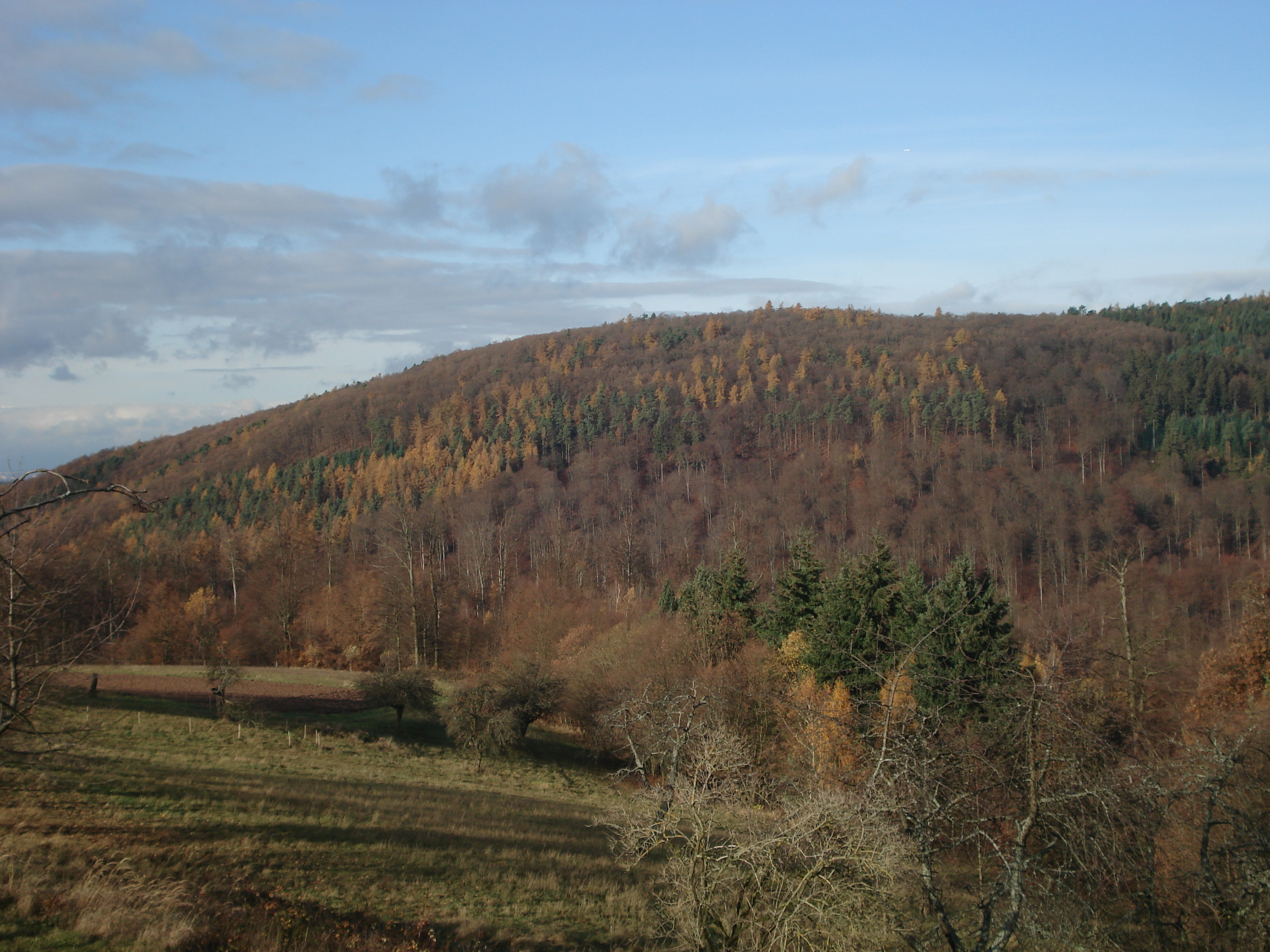
- Schanzenkopf viewed from the southeast

Highest point
- Elevation: 365 m (1,198 ft)
- Coordinates: 50°06′02″N 9°08′41″E

Geography
- Location within Bavaria
- Location: Bavaria, Germany
- Parent range: Spessart

Schanzenkopf (Schwedenschanze) is a wooded hill in the Aschaffenburg district of Bavaria, Germany. It is part of the Mittelgebirge Spessart and lies right on the border with the state of Hesse.

There is another hill named Schanzenkopf south of Alzenau.

== Hill fort ==
The remains of a circular rampart, known locally as Schwedenschanze (Swedish rampart), are found on the hill. They stretch for around 100 m, are 2 to 4 m high and reach a width of 12 m. It is generally attributed to the Hallstatt period.
