= Loreley (Verbandsgemeinde) =

Verbandsgemeinde in Rhineland-Palatinate, Germany

- Verbandsgemeinde
- Coat of arms

- Location of Loreley within Rhein-Lahn-Kreis district
- Interactive map of Loreley
- Location within Germany Location within Rhineland-Palatinate
- Coordinates: 50°09′N 7°43′E
- Country: Germany
- State: Rhineland-Palatinate
- District: Rhein-Lahn-Kreis
- Seat: Sankt Goarshausen
- Subdivisions: 22 municipalities

Area
  - Total: 167.88 km^{2} (64.82 sq mi)

Population (2025-12-31)
  - Total: 16,126
  - Density: 96.057/km^{2} (248.79/sq mi)
- Time zone: UTC+01:00 (CET)
  - Summer (DST): UTC+02:00 (CEST)
- Website: www.vg-loreley.de

Loreley is a Verbandsgemeinde ("collective municipality") in the Rhein-Lahn-Kreis, in Rhineland-Palatinate, Germany. It was historically part of the Duchy of Nassau, a sovereign state until 1866, and is currently located in the Nassau Nature Park. It is situated on the right bank of the Rhine, adjacent to the Nassau district and approx. 25 km southeast of Koblenz. Its seat is in Sankt Goarshausen. It was named after the Loreley Rock. On 1 July 2012, it merged with the former Verbandsgemeinde Braubach. Initially, the new Verbandsgemeinde was named "Braubach-Loreley", but it was renamed "Loreley" on 1 December 2012.

The Verbandsgemeinde Loreley consists of the following Ortsgemeinden ("local municipalities"):

1. Auel
2. Bornich
3. Braubach
4. Dachsenhausen
5. Dahlheim
6. Dörscheid
7. Filsen
8. Kamp-Bornhofen
9. Kaub
10. Kestert
11. Lierschied
12. Lykershausen
13. Nochern
14. Osterspai
15. Patersberg
16. Prath
17. Reichenberg
18. Reitzenhain
19. Sankt Goarshausen
20. Sauerthal
21. Weisel
22. Weyer
