= Filsen =

- Municipality
- Coat of arms

- Location of Filsen within Rhein-Lahn-Kreis district
- Interactive map of Filsen
- Location within Germany Location within Rhineland-Palatinate
- Coordinates: 50°14′24″N 7°35′2″E
- Country: Germany
- State: Rhineland-Palatinate
- District: Rhein-Lahn-Kreis
- Municipal assoc.: Loreley

Government
  - Mayor (2023–24): Sven Faber

Area
  - Total: 1.85 km^{2} (0.71 sq mi)
- Elevation: 75 m (246 ft)

Population (2025-12-31)
  - Total: 648
  - Density: 350/km^{2} (907/sq mi)
- Time zone: UTC+01:00 (CET)
  - Summer (DST): UTC+02:00 (CEST)
- Postal codes: 56341
- Dialling codes: 06773
- Vehicle registration: EMS, DIZ, GOH
- Website: www.filsen.de

Filsen (German pronunciation: [ˈfɪlzn̩]) is a municipality in the district of Rhein-Lahn, in Rhineland-Palatinate, in western Germany.
