= Bornich =

- Municipality
- Coat of arms

- Location of Bornich within Rhein-Lahn-Kreis district
- Interactive map of Bornich
- Location within Germany Location within Rhineland-Palatinate
- Coordinates: 50°7′43″N 7°46′09″E
- Country: Germany
- State: Rhineland-Palatinate
- District: Rhein-Lahn-Kreis
- Municipal assoc.: Loreley

Government
  - Mayor (2019–24): Karin Kristja

Area
  - Total: 12.00 km^{2} (4.63 sq mi)
- Elevation: 300 m (980 ft)

Population (2025-12-31)
  - Total: 907
  - Density: 75.6/km^{2} (196/sq mi)
- Time zone: UTC+01:00 (CET)
  - Summer (DST): UTC+02:00 (CEST)
- Postal codes: 56348
- Dialling codes: 06771
- Vehicle registration: EMS, DIZ, GOH
- Website: www.bornich.de

Bornich is a municipality in the district of Rhein-Lahn, in Rhineland-Palatinate, in western Germany.
