= Schwedenschanze (Dörscheid) =

- Dörscheid
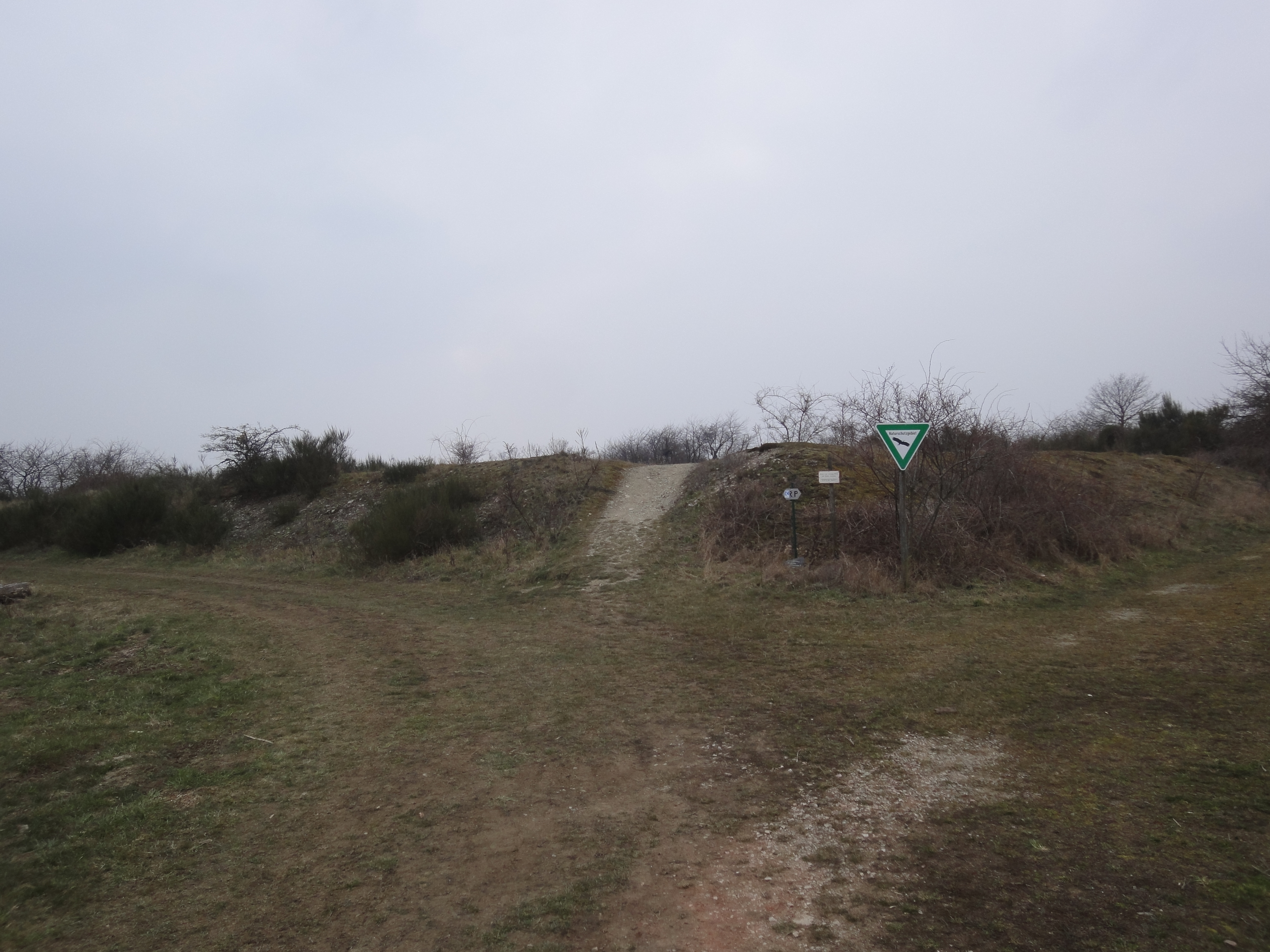
- The Schanze seen from the direction of Dörscheid

Site information
- Type: Sternschanze
- Code: DE-RP
- Condition: burgstall (no above-ground ruins)

Location
- Coordinates: 50°06′30″N 7°44′40″E
- Height: 349 m above sea level (NN)

Site history
- Built: probably 1631/32

The Schwedenschanze in Dörscheid in the Middle Rhine valley is a Sternschanze or star-shaped fortification that was probably built when the Landgrave of Hesse was besieged by the Palatine Kaub in 1631/32 during the Thirty Years' War.

The schanze lie 750 metres west of the village of Dörscheid on an eminence. It is no longer recognisable as a Sternschanze because it has been heavily slighted. Only at the southwestern tip is the bank up to about 2 metres high. There was once a ditch about five metres wide that is no longer visible.

== Protected monument ==
The site of the schanze is a protected ground monument (Bodendenkmal) under Rhineland-Palatinate law. Permission must be sought for excavations and targeted collection of artefacts; incidental finds must be reported to the authorities.

== Literature ==
- Karl August von Cohausen: Landwehren und alte Schanzen des Regierungsbezirks Wiesbaden in the Nassau Annals (Nassauische Annalen), Vol. 15 (1879).
