= Prath, Germany =

Prath
- Municipality
- Coat of arms

- Location of Prath within Rhein-Lahn-Kreis district
- Interactive map of Prath
- Location within Germany Location within Rhineland-Palatinate
- Coordinates: 50°11′49″N 7°41′10″E
- Country: Germany
- State: Rhineland-Palatinate
- District: Rhein-Lahn-Kreis
- Municipal assoc.: Loreley

Government
  - Mayor (2023–24): Rebecca Fischbach

Area
  - Total: 4.33 km^{2} (1.67 sq mi)
- Elevation: 280 m (920 ft)

Population (2025-12-31)
  - Total: 301
  - Density: 69.5/km^{2} (180/sq mi)
- Time zone: UTC+01:00 (CET)
  - Summer (DST): UTC+02:00 (CEST)
- Postal codes: 56346
- Dialling codes: 06771
- Vehicle registration: EMS, DIZ, GOH

Prath (German pronunciation: [pʁaːt]) is a municipality in the district of Rhein-Lahn, in Rhineland-Palatinate, in western Germany.
