= Alzenau =

- Town
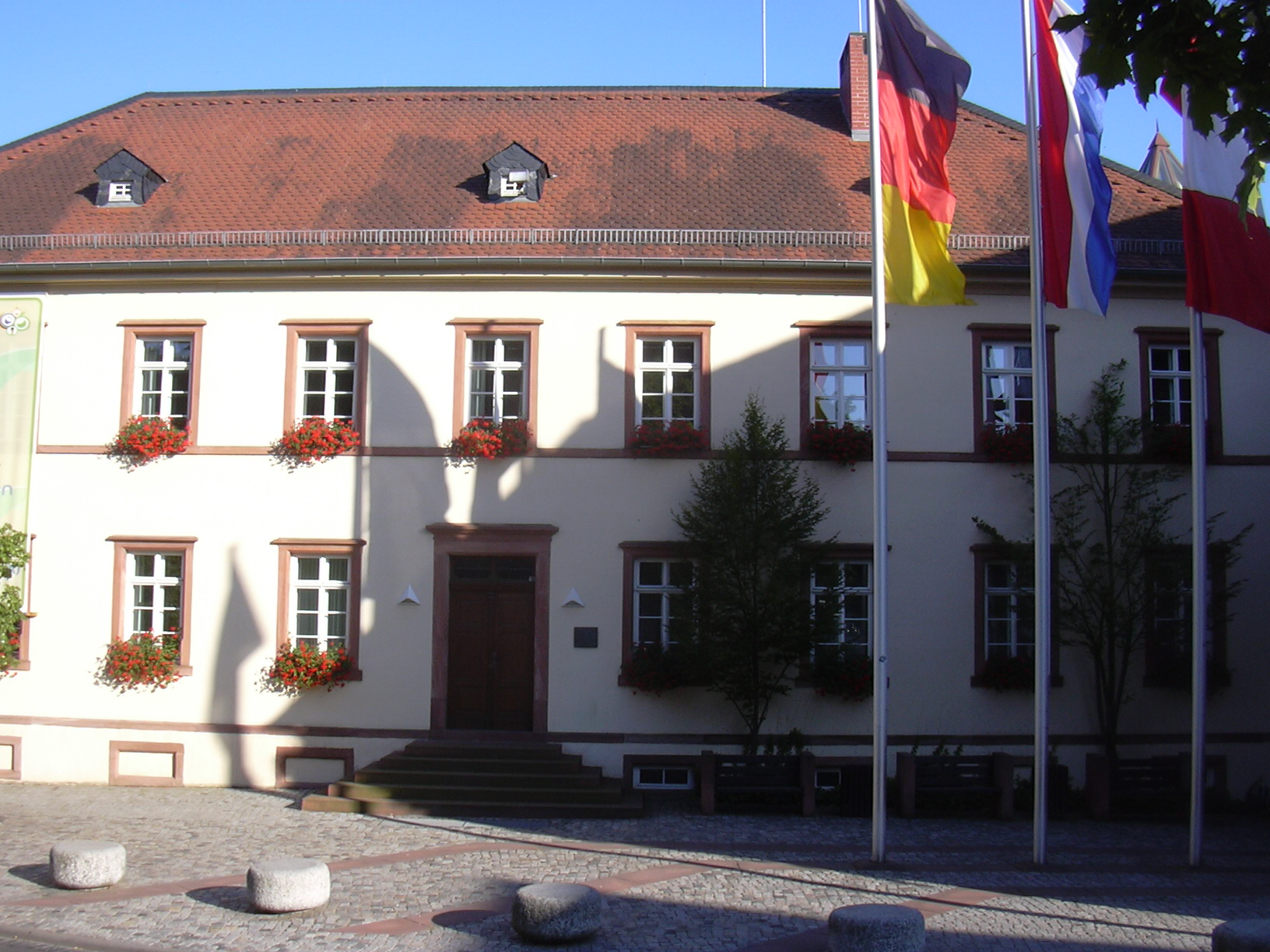
- Town hall

- Coat of arms

- Location of Alzenau within Aschaffenburg district
- Interactive map of Alzenau
- Location within Germany Location within Bavaria
- Coordinates: 50°04′N 09°04′E
- Country: Germany
- State: Bavaria
- Admin. region: Lower Franconia
- District: Aschaffenburg
- Subdivisions: 6 Stadtteile

Government
  - Mayor (2020–26): Stephan Noll (CSU)

Area
  - Total: 59.3 km^{2} (22.9 sq mi)
- Elevation: 126 m (413 ft)

Population (2025-12-31)
  - Total: 17,968
  - Density: 303/km^{2} (785/sq mi)
- Time zone: UTC+01:00 (CET)
  - Summer (DST): UTC+02:00 (CEST)
- Postal codes: 63755
- Dialling codes: 06023
- Vehicle registration: AB, ALZ
- Website: www.alzenau.de

Alzenau (German: [ˈaltsənaʊ]; until 31 December 2006 officially Alzenau i.UFr.) is a town in the north of the Aschaffenburg district in the Regierungsbezirk of Lower Franconia (Unterfranken) in Bavaria, Germany. Until 1 July 1972, Alzenau was the district seat of the now abolished district of the same name and has a population of around 19,000.

== Geography ==
=== Location ===
Alzenau is one of the eastern outliers of the Frankfurt Rhine Main Region and is crossed by the river Kahl. Most of its Gemeindeteile nestle on or between the slopes of the western outliers of the Spessart with its Hahnenkamm (436 m above Normalhöhennull). The closest hills to the town are Heilberg and Schanzenkopf.

With roughly 2,600 ha of woodland and 85 ha of vineyards, it has been referred to as Stadt im Grünen ("Town in the Green"). Alzenau is only a short drive on the A 45 or trainride on the Kahlgrundbahn from Aschaffenburg, Hanau or Frankfurt am Main.

=== Neighbouring municipalities ===
Alzenau borders in the north on the municipalities of Rodenbach and Freigericht, in the east and southeast on the municipalities of Mömbris and Johannesberg, in the southwest on the municipality of Karlstein and in the west on the municipality of Kahl am Main.

=== Gemeindeteile ===
Gemeindeteile

Alzenau's quarters are Albstadt, Hörstein, Kälberau, Michelbach and Wasserlos.

On 1 January 1972, Kälberau was amalgamated into Alzenau. Albstadt and Wasserlos followed on 1 July that same year, as did Hörstein and Michelbach three years later, on 1 July 1975.

== Name ==
The former epithet “in Unterfranken” (“in Lower Franconia”) distinguished it from another Alzenau (now Olszanka, Opole Voivodeship, Silesia), which since the Potsdam Agreement has been in Poland.

Until the 15th century, Alzenau was known as Wilmundsheim. When the Archbishop of Mainz built a castle on the other side of the Kahl, the name was changed to Alzenau, likely because the place lay allzu nahe (“all too near”) the castle.

== History ==
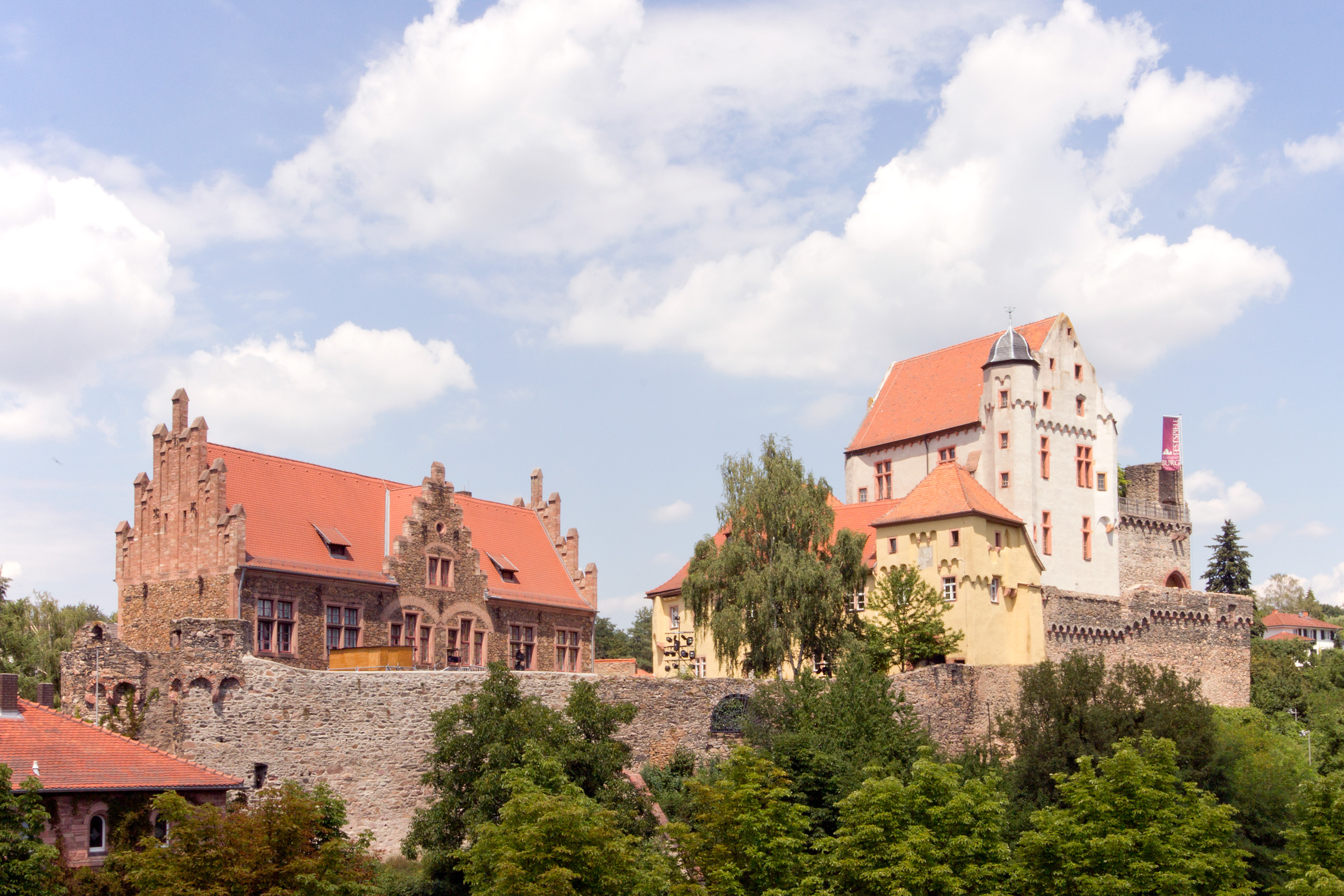
Alzenau Castle

The area was settled quite early on. There are traces of settlement and graves from Hallstatt times (Iron Age), graves from the Beaker culture (2600 BC) and crematory graves from the Old Urnfield times (about 1000 BC).

In 950 the municipality of Wilmundsheim on the Kahl's left bank had its first documentary mention.

In the 12th century, the Freigericht (“Free Court”) was established by Emperor Friedrich Barbarossa comprising the settlements of Wildmundsheim, Hörstein, Mömbris and Somborn and it was excused taxes and obligatory service. The twigs in the town's coat of arms symbolize this heritage. The Märker, as the townsmen sometimes called themselves, had to defend their autonomy against local noble families’ ambitions; these included the Rannenbergs and the Rienecks, and further pressures came from the Archbishops of Mainz.

These last built Alzenau Castle (Burg Alzenau) on the Kahl's right bank, across from Wilmundsheim, between 1395 and 1399 to protect their local holdings. In 1401, the settlement below this castle was granted town and market rights by King Ruprecht of the Palatinate, although these could not be realized. A few years later, the old centre of Wilmundsheim was destroyed and it was melded with the settlement across the Kahl, whereupon it also took the castle's name.

In the course of striving for Imperial reform, Emperor Maximilian I enfeoffed both the Archbishopric of Mainz and the Counts of Hanau in 1500 with the joint lordship over the free court, for which the two fiefholders were together to appoint the Amtmann ("bailiff" or "governor"). Conflicts arose from the inhabitants’ insistence on their ancestral freedoms and the denominational antagonism between the Calvinist Counts of Hanau on the one side and the Catholic population and the Archbishop on the other.

The condominium lasted until the Counts of Hanau died out in 1736. The Archbishop of Mainz then took over the free court as its only surviving lord, but in 1740 had to cede the Amt of Somborn to the Landgraves of Hesse-Kassel, who were the heirs to the County of Hanau, after a fierce legal battle. What was thereafter left of the free court was incorporated as the Amt of Alzenau into the Archbishopric of Mainz. The Wheel of Mainz in the town's arms still recalls this time today.

The Reichsdeputationshauptschluss of 1803 awarded the Amt of Alzenau to the Landgrave of Hesse-Darmstadt. In 1816, the Grand Duchy of Hesse ceded the Amt to the Kingdom of Bavaria, and Alzenau has since remained Bavarian.

In 1862, Alzenau was raised to district seat. With the building of the Kahlgrundbahn railway, the municipality – and thereby the whole Kahlgrund (the countryside along the river Kahl) – was linked to the railway network as of 1898. In 1951, Alzenau was granted town rights by the Free State of Bavaria.

In the course of municipal reform, the old Alzenau and Aschaffenburg districts were merged in 1972. The municipalities of Albstadt, Kälberau and Wasserlos were amalgamated. In the end, Alzenau took its current shape when the market municipality of Hörstein and the municipality of Michelbach were amalgamated in 1975.

== Politics ==
=== Landräte (“Chief District Administrators”) of the former Alzenau district ===
- 1946–1949 Friedrich Huth
- 1950–1970 Heinrich Degen
- 1970–1972 Karl Lautenschläger

=== Town council ===
Alzenau's town council has 24 seats.

Alzenau town council elections
Date	Voter turnout	CSU	SPD	FDP	Grüne	FW/PWG	KL
03.03.2002	58.4%	12 seats	6 seats	2 seats	2 seats	2 seats	–
02.03.2008	58.8%	11 seats	5 seats	2 seats	3 seats	2 seats	1 seat

=== Coat of arms ===
The town's arms might be described thus: Gules a wheel spoked of six argent, in base two twigs Or per saltire.

The German blazon reads “In Rot über zwei gekreuzten goldenen Zweigen ein sechsspeichiges silbernes Rad”. This describes the twigs as “golden”, although they are rendered here in silver.

In 1401, King Ruprecht raised Alzenau to town, but the town never exercised its rights (until 1951) and remained a market municipality. From 1309 comes the first documentary record. The contents of this document deal with the Freigericht (“Free Court”) with four court regions, the so-called Hohe Mark. Since the first half of the 13th century the royal hunting forest had been owned by the Archbishopric of Mainz. In 1395, the whole market municipality passed to the Archbishopric. This part of Alzenau's history is recalled by the six-spoked wheel – the so-called Wheel of Mainz – which was a charge borne by the Archbishops in their arms. The two twigs refer to the court officials who were chosen from among the townsmen to be on the court.

The arms have been borne since 1926.

=== Town partnerships ===
- Sint-Oedenrode, North Brabant, Netherlands
- Pfaffstätten, Lower Austria, Austria
- Thaon-les-Vosges, Vosges, France

== Economy and infrastructure ==
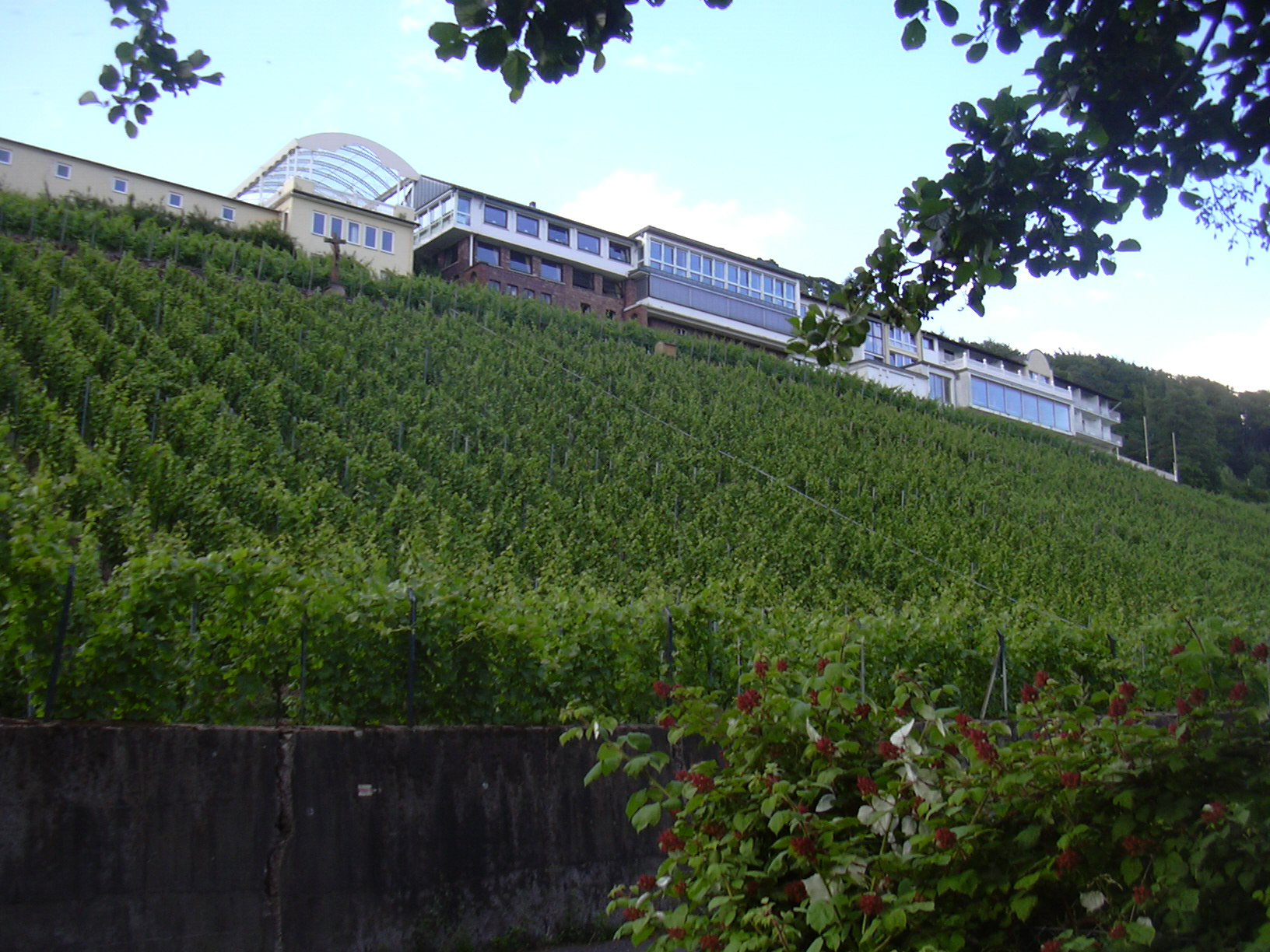
The Schlossberg with vineyard

The town also distinguishes itself with an unusually high number of resident businesses, most of which stem from high technology fields. In 1999, Alzenau was recognized as an “Economy-Friendly municipality” with a special award from the Bavarian Minister of State for Economy, Transport and Technology.

=== Agriculture, forestry, winegrowing ===
In 1998, there were 62 people contributors to the social welfare funds employed in agriculture and forestry. In 1999, there were 82 agricultural businesses with a cultivated area of 1,429 ha, of which 1,096 ha was cropland and 257 ha was meadowland.

In the outlying centres of Michelbach, Wasserlos and Hörstein, Frankenwein (Franconian wine) is grown. In Albstadt, too, there was winegrowing until the late 19th century, as witnessed by the Gemarkung (traditional rural cadastral area) of Wingertsberg. Winegrowing was brought to Alzenau by the monks from the monastery in Seligenstadt. All in all, though, agriculture and forestry have lost importance for the municipality.

=== Transport ===
Alzenau currently has three interchanges on the A 45 (Dortmund–Aschaffenburg), the newest being the Alzenau-Mitte interchange opened on 23 November 2007, after many years in planning, joining the linking road between Alzenau and Kahl to the Autobahn, thereby providing a better link to the industrial areas in Alzenau and Kahl.

The Kahlgrundbahn railway links the town with Kahl am Main and Hanau railway stations, where there are direct connections with the S-Bahn to Frankfurt am Main and long-distance trains.

The individual centres in the town are served by the City-Bus lines. One route runs hourly from Alzenau by way of Wasserlos and Hörstein as a regional bus on to Karlstein and to Dettingen railway station, where travellers can transfer to regional trains to Aschaffenburg and Würzburg.

Frankfurt Airport can be reached by car within 30 to 40 minutes.

=== Established businesses ===
What follows is a selection of businesses resident in Alzenau:

- Alexander Shorokhoff GmbH, luxury mechanical watches
- ABB Automation Products
- Applied Materials GmbH
- Biotest Medizintechnik
- Buhler Leybold Optics
- Hyundai Motorsport GmbH, World Rally Championship team
- Mahle GmbH
- MSC Software
- Nukem
- Schott Solar AG
- Xella
- Nikon Metrology Europe NV

=== Sport and leisure facilities ===
In each Gemeindeteil are found halls and sporting grounds for the many sport clubs. Available in each Gemeindeteil are playgrounds, and in some also football pitches, basketball hoops and skating facilities. In summer, the Waldschwimmbad (“Forest Swimming Pool”) and the Meerhofsee (lake) are open. Furthermore, the pool at the Edith-Stein-Realschule is open to the public a few evenings each week. The bodies of water that arose from the former brown coal works on the Kahler Seenplatte (“Kahl Lake Plateau”) lie nearby, from 5 to 10 km away.

The football club, FC Bayern Alzenau, is based in Alzenau.

== Institutions ==
=== Administrative institutions and authorities ===
- Aschaffenburg Amtsgericht, Alzenau branch court
- Alzenau town administration
- Alzenau police force
- Aschaffenburg district administration office, Alzenau branch location and registration office
- Federal Agency for Technical Relief, Alzenau chapter

=== Educational institutions ===
In 1999, the following institutions existed:

- Kindergartens: 9 places with 705 children
- Elementary schools: 4 with 81 teachers and 1432 students
- Realschulen: 1 with 45 teachers and 1000 students
- Hahnenkammschule zur Lernförderung (special education)
- Spessart-Gymnasium Alzenau with roughly 1500 students
- Städtische Musikschule Alzenau (municipal music school)
- Städtische Bibliothek Alzenau (municipal library)
- VHS Kahl-Alzenau-Karlstein (folk high school), Alzenau branch
- “Grünes Klassenzimmer” (“Green Classroom”) in the town forest

=== Health ===
- Alzenau-Wasserlos district hospital

=== Seniors ===
- Caritas Sozialstation
- BRK Seniorenheim

=== Youth ===
- Jugendtreff „Teestube“ (youth meeting place)

=== Sanitation ===
- Recycling yard
- 6 garden waste gathering centres

== Nature ==
- An important part of the landscape in Alzenau is the large amount of area given over to Streuobstwiesen (meadow orchards), which with their tall, unclustered trees furnish an important habitat for species that have become rare, such as the red-backed shrike or the little owl. Planting tall-trunked fruit trees is financially promoted by the town.
- Also ecologically very important are the Sandmagerrasenflächen in the Alzenauer Sande conservation area, on which a few threatened and endangered wasteland species find their habitat.

== Culture and sightseeing ==
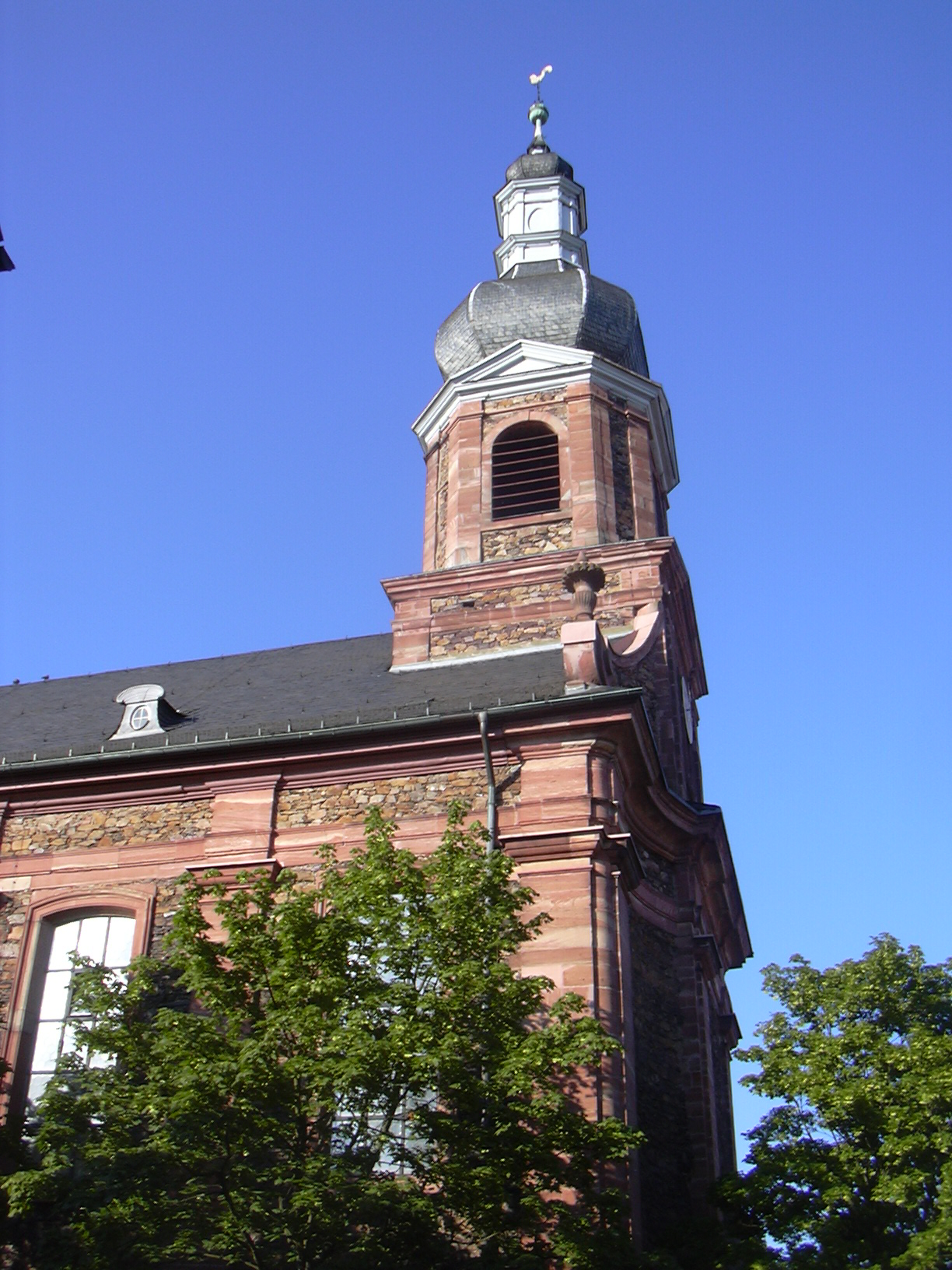
St. Justinus (1758)

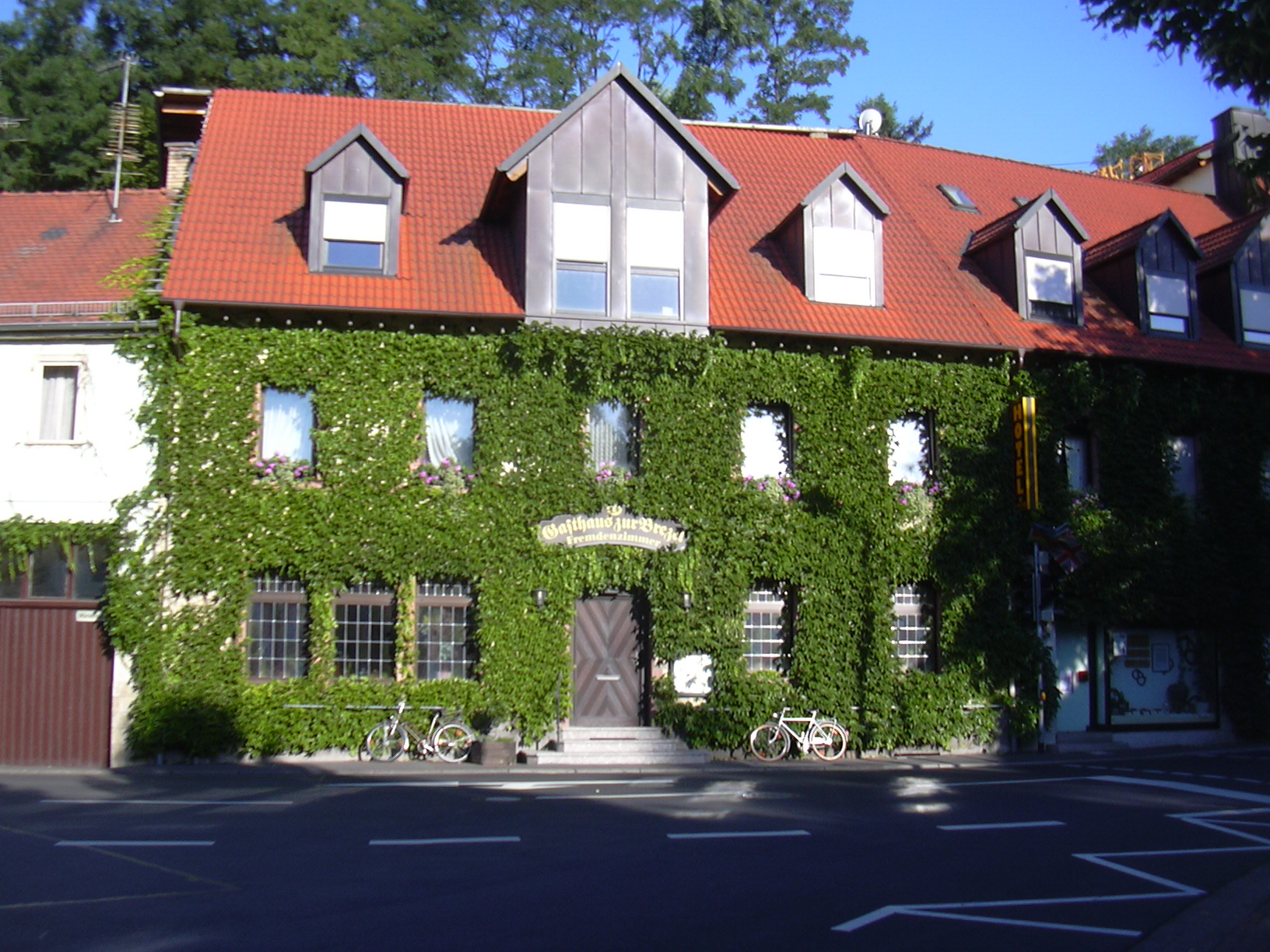
Oldest inn (mentioned in 1744), since 2004 a brewery

- At Alzenau Castle the Burgfestspiele (“Castle Festival Games”) and the AlzenauClassics are held in summer, and in autumn the Fränkische Musiktage (“Franconian Music Days”) within the framework of Bayerischer Rundfunk’s Musikzauber Franken (“Franconia Music Magic”).
- To the tradition of the Baroque Saint Justin's Parish Church (Pfarrkirche St. Justinus) the Alzenauers have built a bridge to the year 834. At that time, Archbishop Odgar of Mainz brought Saint Justin's bones with him from Rome. They found their way to Saint Justin's Church in Höchst and thence in 1298 into St. Alban's Abbey in Mainz; part of the relics, however, ended up in the monastery at the Einhard-Basilika in Seligenstadt. Since the Benedictines there were fellow caretakers of the old parish church of Wilmundsheim, which stood on what is today the graveyard lands, a link was made, and Saint Justin was venerated in Alzenau. Of the Wilmundsheim church, which was torn down long ago, all that is left is a single capital. The current Baroque church building comes from 1758. Saint Justin's bones have never been in Alzenau.
- The Town Hall, built in 1860-62, was planned as a school, but then became the Royal Bavarian Regional Office. A new wing built in 1974 in Buntsandstein brings contemporary architecture together with Classicist building.
- The town's oldest inn was first named as a Wirtshaus (“public house”) from the Seligenstadt Monastery's ownership in a document in which it was sold to an Alzenau innkeeper. The current owner, who acquired the building clad in Parthenocissus vines in 1995, set up in 2004 a hotel with a small brewery, where according to advertising, beer is made in accordance with the Reinheitsgebot of 1516.
- The Villa Meßmer houses an inn today in a park with historical tree population.
- The Solarparcours illustrates the usages of photovoltaics with the help of 20 examples within the inner town area (3.5 km-long tour) and without (whole tour 12 km). What is seen along this learning path is a coöperative project by the town of Alzenau and the resident business Schott Solar (formerly ASE), which manufactures the solar modules in Alzenau.

=== Outlying centres, countryside ===
Some cycle and hiking paths around Alzenau, as Europäische Kulturwege Alzenau I, II und III (created by the Aschaffenburg project group Archäologisches Spessartprojekt), are tied into the project "Pathways to Cultural Landscapes" promoted by the European Union between 2000 and 2003. On these routes, noteworthy destinations are signposted and documented. Examples include the following:

- Kälberau pilgrimage church (several building phases, 14th to 16th century) with large expansion from 1955 to 1957, affiliated with a Pallottine monastery. The pilgrimage church houses as an iconic object the statue Maria zum rauhen Wind.
- Schloss zu Wasserlos (“Palace at Wasserlos”), today the district hospital
- The Jewish graveyard between Hörstein and Wasserlos is one of the biggest in the Aschaffenburg district. It was begun in 1812, severely damaged by the Nazis and restored after the Second World War. Two hundred and sixty-six gravestones are still extant
- The Catholic Pfarrkirche zu Hörstein ("Parish church at Hörstein") from 1473 has a Romanesque defensive tower
- The Burgstall Randenburg, a former castle's site, is a monument from the late Middle Ages
- Historic vineyards stretch from Alzenau southwards through Wasserlos and Hörstein as well as northeastwards through Michelbach and Albstadt
- Schloss Maisenhausen from 1753 in the outlying centre of Michelbach, privately owned today

=== Regular events ===
- Orchestra concert by the music club „Concordia“ Michelbach 1923 e.V. (Palm Sunday, school gymnasium, Michelbach)
- Weinfest am Park in the summer garden of the Parkhotel in the outlying centre of Wasserlos every year in the week before Ascension Day
- Wine, cheese, and wind music (Sunday before Ascension Day, Schlösschen Michelbach)
- Brückenfest (“Bridge Festival”) by THW Alzenau at Corpus Christi
- Town Festival around Alzenau Castle
- October–November: Franconian Music Days (choral and chamber music from several centuries)
- Melodien bei Kerzenschein (“Melodies by Candlelight”) at the Prischoßhalle (second weekend in November)
- Hoffest at the Hotel Krone, yearly on the first weekend in September
- Great Christmas Market on the first weekend in Advent
- Michelbacher Winzerfest (winemakers’ festival, September/October)
- Pannfest, oldest street festival in the heart of the Pann, the oldest part of Alzenau on Wilmundsheimer Straße, since 1978 in September, whose proceeds are always donated for various projects by the festival's organizers, the Kolping family (actually a Catholic charity).
- Waste your time, a rock concert by the Spessart-Gymnasium in February
- Whatanoise, a concert by the JIA (Jugend Initiative Alzenau) at the Hahnenkammhalle in Wasserlos
- X-mas Rock-Konzert by the JIA at Christmastime

== Religion ==
- Roman Catholic parish of Saint Justin (Sankt Justinus)
- Evangelical Lutheran parish of Peter and Paul
- Yavuz Sultan Selim Han Mosque

The town's population is overwhelmingly Catholic.

== Notable people ==
=== Sons and daughters of the town ===
- Paul (Pablo) Michel, (1905–1977), chessmaster
- Arno Borst (1925–2007), historian (mediaevalist)
- Franz A. Stein (1928–1999), musicologist
- Franz Adolf Gräbner (1944–2004), artist
- Alexander Leipold (born 1969), freestyle wrestler stripped of an Olympic gold medal in 2000, Federal new-blood trainer for freestyle wrestling
- Anna Bergmann (born 1953), cultural scientist
- Jochen Bendel (born 1967), German radio speaker and television moderator
- Johannes Scherer (born 1973), radio and television host and comedian
- Heiko Westermann (born 1983), footballer
- Björn Ziegenbein (born 1986), footballer
- Pascal Thomas (born 1987), actor, musical singer
- Max Wissel (born 1989), racing driver
- Svenja Huth (born 1991), footballer

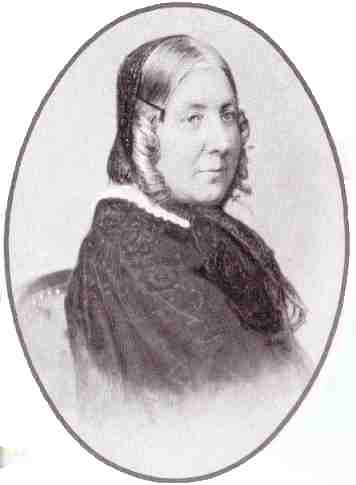
Ludovica des Bordes

=== People linked with Alzenau ===
- Ludovica des Bordes (1787–1854), lady of Schloss Wasserlos
- Claus Mehs (1866–1946), architect, built the Villa Meßmer in 1902–1904
