= Braubach =

- Town
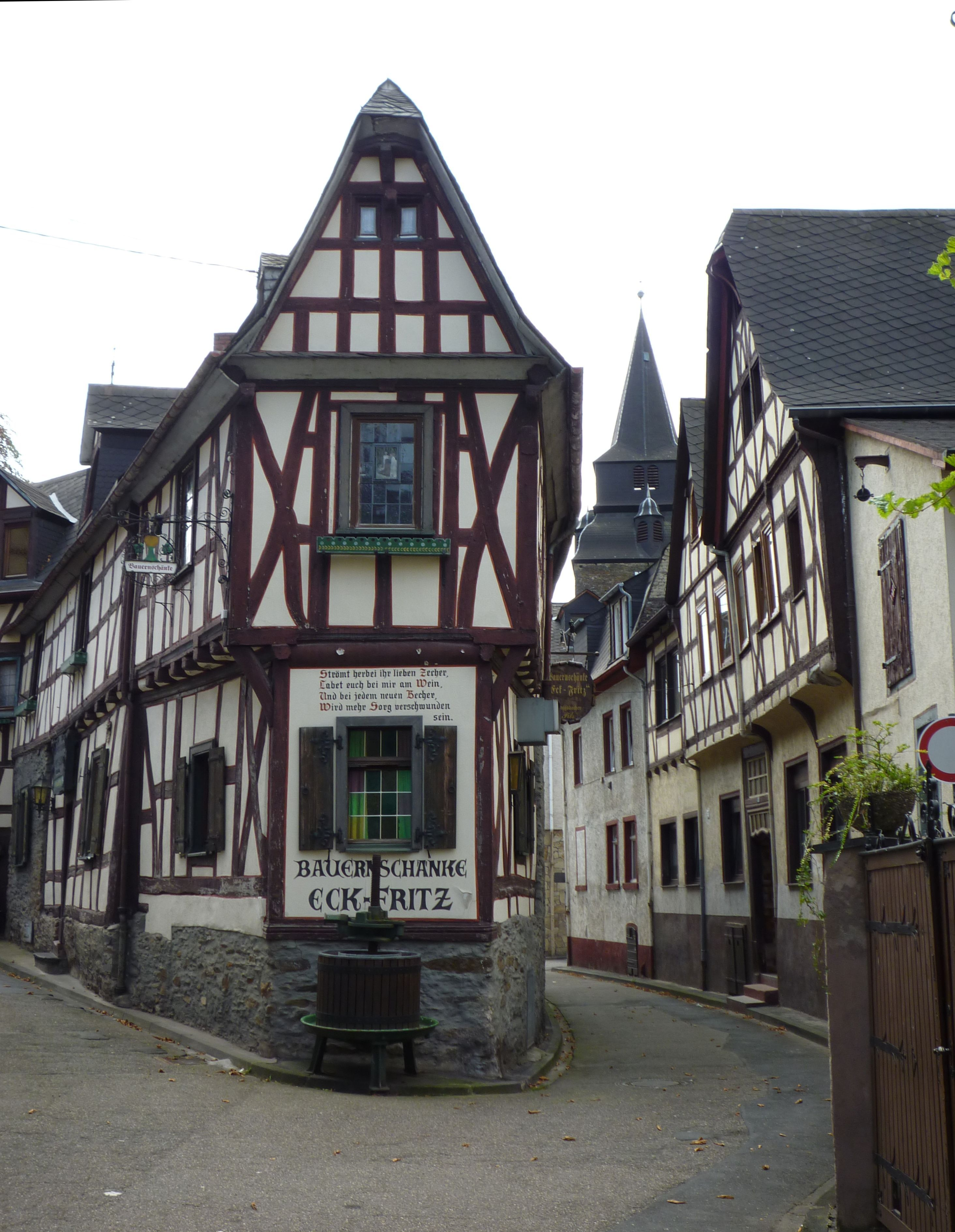

- Coat of arms

- Location of Braubach within Rhein-Lahn-Kreis district
- Interactive map of Braubach
- Location within Germany Location within Rhineland-Palatinate
- Coordinates: 50°16′29″N 7°38′46″E
- Country: Germany
- State: Rhineland-Palatinate
- District: Rhein-Lahn-Kreis
- Municipal assoc.: Loreley

Government
  - Mayor (2019–24): Joachim Müller (CDU)

Area
  - Total: 19.5 km^{2} (7.5 sq mi)
- Elevation: 65 m (213 ft)

Population (2025-12-31)
  - Total: 2,986
  - Density: 153/km^{2} (397/sq mi)
- Time zone: UTC+01:00 (CET)
  - Summer (DST): UTC+02:00 (CEST)
- Postal codes: 56338
- Dialling codes: 02627
- Vehicle registration: EMS, DIZ, GOH
- Website: www.stadt-braubach.de

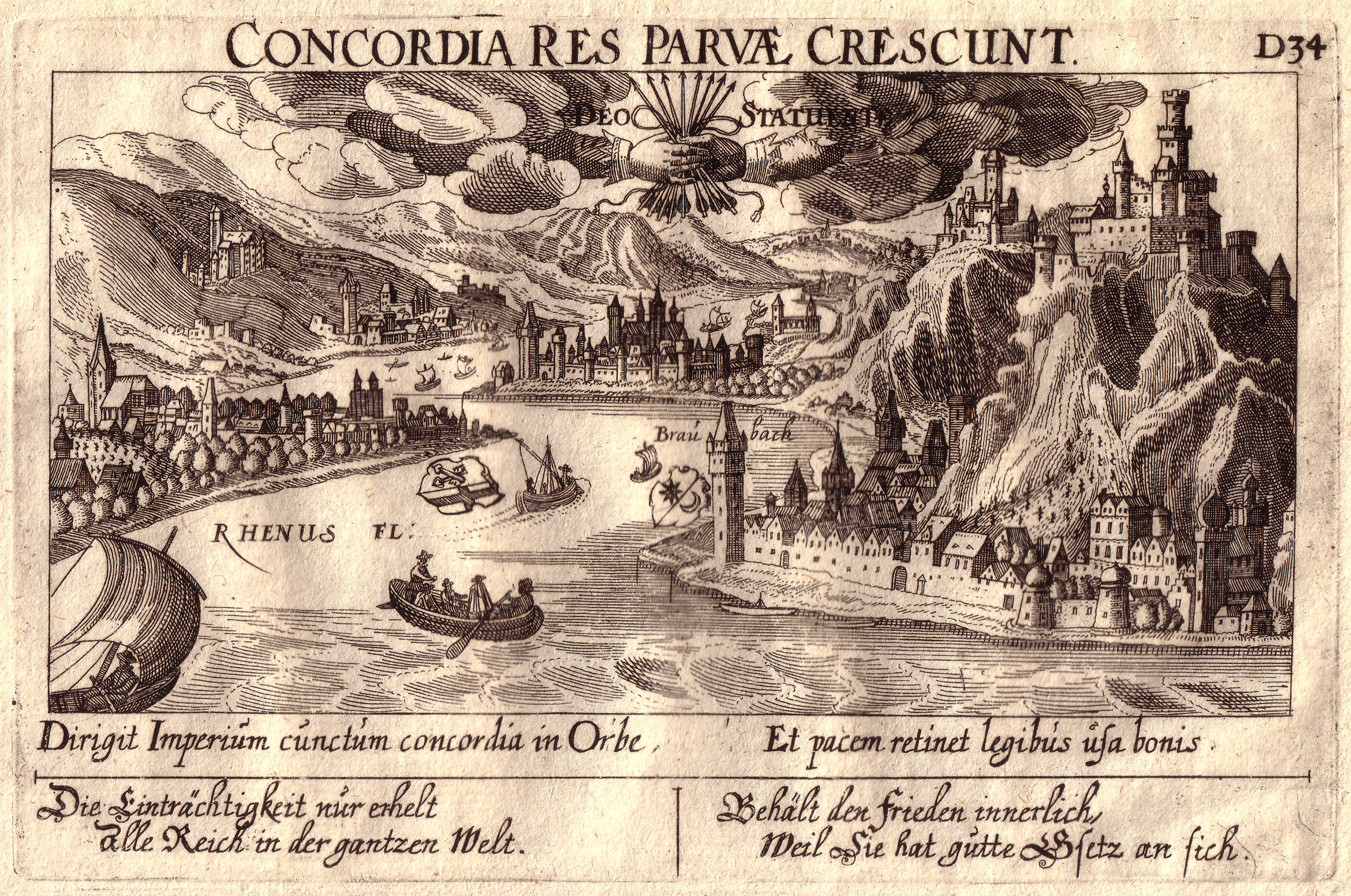
Steel engraving from Braubach with the river Rhine, around 1630.

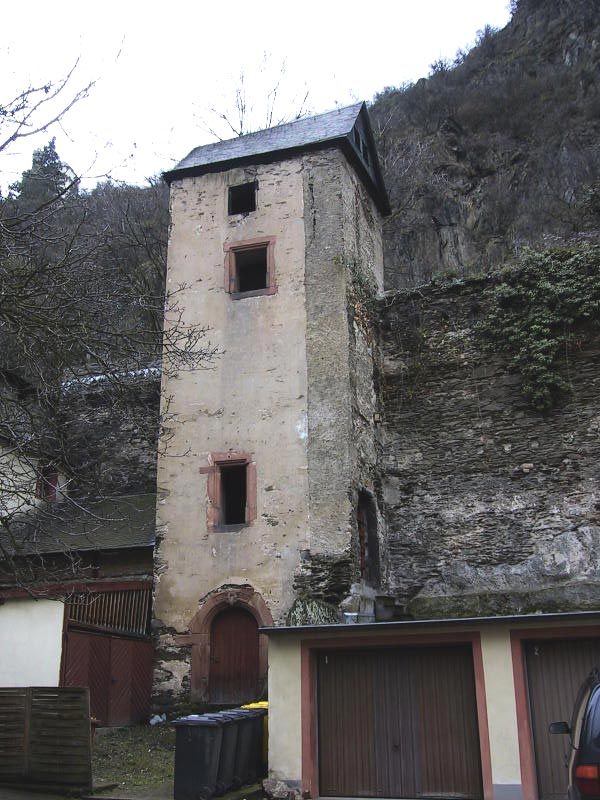
Part of city wall

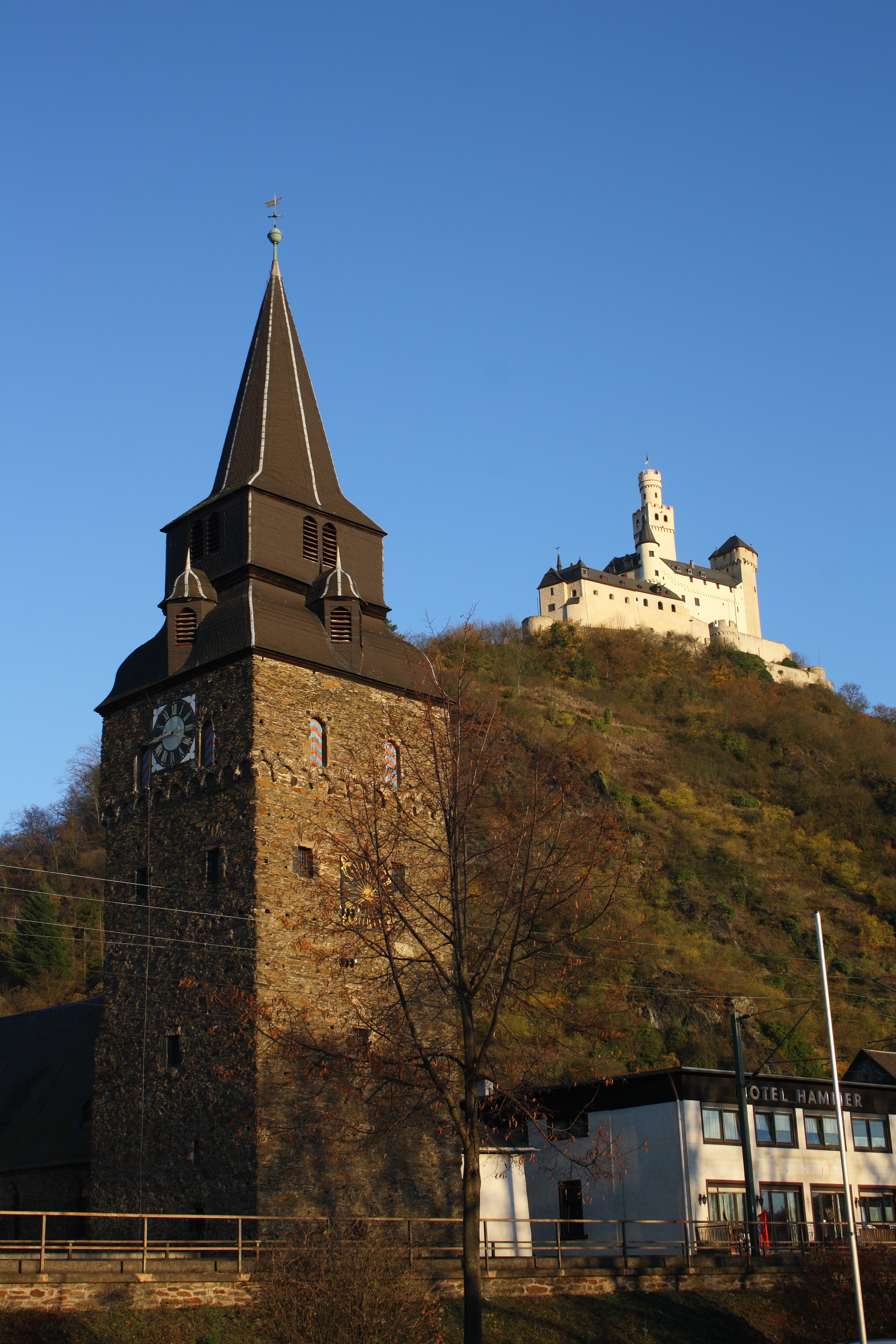
St Barbara with the Marksburg above town

Braubach (German pronunciation: [ˈbʁaʊbax]) is a municipality in the Rhein-Lahn-Kreis, in Rhineland-Palatinate, Germany. It is situated on the right bank of the Rhine, approx. 10 km southeast of Koblenz. Braubach has assorted medieval architecture intact, including portions of the town wall, half-timbered buildings, and castle Marksburg on the hill above.

Braubach was the seat of the former Verbandsgemeinde ("collective municipality") Braubach.

== History ==
In 1276 King Rudolf of Habsburg made Braubach a free city under Count Gottfried of Eppstein. Count Eberhard I of Katzenelnbogen bought the city and castle in 1283. Until 1479, the Counts rebuilt the castle constantly. The castle was never conquered and never destroyed. The City of Braubach was the administrative centre of the Katzenelnbogen wine production with Rhens, Spay, Boppard, Horchheim and Salzig and an amount of 33000 L of wine in 1438 and 84000 L of wine in 1443.

Braubuch owes also its economic development to mining of lead and silver that started in 1769. On the nearby Pankert mountain, one can still see three chimneys used for smeltering.

In the 1845 travel guide Le Rhin, Victor Hugo notes: "Then comes Braubach, named in a charter of 933, fief of the Counts Arnstein of Lahngau; an Imperial city under Rodolph in 1270, a domain of the Counts of Katzenelnbogen in 1283; accruing to Hesse in 1473; to Darmstadt, in 1632, and in 1802 to Nassau. Braubach, communicating with the baths of the Taunus, is charmingly situated at the foot of a high rock, crested by Marksburg, the castle of which is now a state prison.

== Partner cities ==
- (France) Villeneuve-sur-Yonne
