= Dörscheid =

- Municipality
- Coat of arms

- Location of Dörscheid within Rhein-Lahn-Kreis district
- Interactive map of Dörscheid
- Location within Germany Location within Rhineland-Palatinate
- Coordinates: 50°06′25″N 7°45′31″E
- Country: Germany
- State: Rhineland-Palatinate
- District: Rhein-Lahn-Kreis
- Municipal assoc.: Loreley

Government
  - Mayor (2019–24): Martin Lübke

Area
  - Total: 8.65 km^{2} (3.34 sq mi)
- Elevation: 340 m (1,120 ft)

Population (2025-12-31)
  - Total: 360
  - Density: 42/km^{2} (110/sq mi)
- Time zone: UTC+01:00 (CET)
  - Summer (DST): UTC+02:00 (CEST)
- Postal codes: 56348
- Dialling codes: 06774
- Vehicle registration: EMS, DIZ, GOH
- Website: www.doerscheid.de

Dörscheid is a municipality in the district of Rhein-Lahn, in Rhineland-Palatinate, in western Germany.

West of the village is the protected monument of the Schwedenschanze.
