= Beten =

The three Beten (or Bethen, Beden) are a legendary German group of three saints. They are adored in minor churches and chapels in South Tyrol (Italy), Upper Bavaria, Baden and the Rhineland. Although, the tradition of the "Three Virgins" has existed since the late Middle Ages, it is observed only regionally and not included in the official lists of saints of the Catholic Church.

== Name variants ==
The name Beten first appeared in the works of Hans Christoph Schöll in the 1930s. It was derived from the common endings of the three women's names, of which some variants are:

- Einbet(h), Ambet(h), Embet(h), Ainbeth, Ainpeta, Einbede, Aubet
- Worbet(h), Borbet, Wolbeth, Warbede, Gwerbeth
- Wilbet(h), Willebede, Vilbeth, Fürbeth, Firpet, Cubet

== History ==
References to St. Einbeth first appeared in Strasbourg in the second half of the 12th century; she became associated with Wilbeth and Worbeth in the second half of the 14th century. The three names' origins are unknown. In the era of 19th-century romanticism, speculation arose that the Three Virgins might be Christianized pagan Germanic, Celtic or Roman goddesses.

In 1936, local historian Hans Christoph Schöll of Heidelberg developed a theory that the three saints were derived from a Germanic or Indo-European Triple Goddess. Schöll admitted his treatise was not a scientific study based on linguistic evidence, but was formulated around phonetic similarities. He planned a second book with scientific evidence for his theory, but it was never published. Due to Schöll's lack of scientific methodology, his theory was rejected (H. Hepding 1936; E. Krieck 1936) by the scientific world. It has nevertheless spread in esoteric circles, almost exclusively in German-speaking countries.

In the 20th century, cultural anthropologists like M. Zender (1987) researched the history and distribution of the cult of the three saints in the Middle Ages and early modern times. Although many depictions of groups of three women (e.g. the Germanic and Celtic Matrones) have been found in Gallo-Roman culture, the names of the Beten did not appear in pre-medieval contexts, nor in Celtic literature of the British Isles.

== Speculation on place names ==
In his work on the Beten, Schöll assumed that place names with syllables even slightly similar to the names of the Beten bore traces of their cult, e.g. Bet-, Bed-, Bad-, Batz-, Bott-, Boden-, Bettel-, Wetter-, Wetten-, Wetz-, Witz-, Pütz-, Bieders-, Patt- etc. He suspected town names with Am-, An-, Ein-, En-, Wil-, Wiel-, Wild-, Wol-, Wüll-, Bor-, Wor-, Bar-, War-, Werr-, Worr-, Kirr-, to indicate the Beten cult. Consequently, Schoöll claimed that a huge amount of applicable names have been found in Central Europe and Great Britain. He suggested that many European settlement names are derived from them; for example:

- In Germany: Bedburg, Bettendorf, Homburg-Beden
- In France: Besançon, Les Bets, Bessay and the mountain Bethoa
- In England, Bedford

Names such as these are supposed to define the range of a possible "Beten-cult". Many of these names are known to pre-date the Beten, and Christianity itself, by hundreds or thousands of years. For example, Besançon was recorded in ancient Roman Times as the similar Vesontio, and likely originates from Celtic *ves-, "mountain". None of these are accepted by linguists, and some are common German words.
