= Otto A.G.O. 80/100 hp =

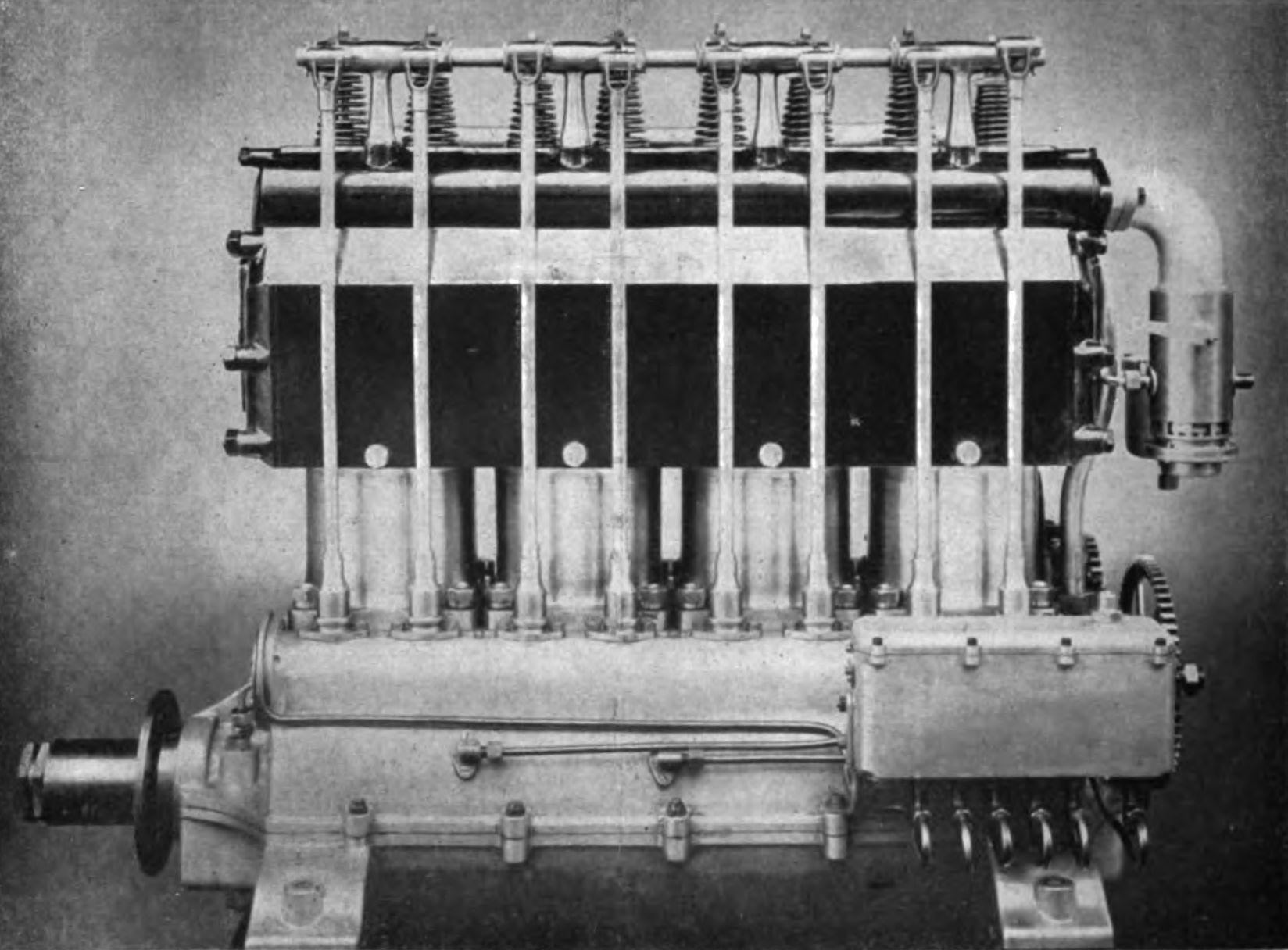
- Aeromotor Gustav Otto 80/100 hp aircraft engine
- Type: Piston inline aero engine
- National origin: Germany
- Manufacturer: Gustav Otto Flugmaschinenwerke
- First run: c. 1911

The Otto A.G.O. 80/100 hp aircraft engine from 1911 was a four-cylinder, water cooled inline engine built by the German Gustav Otto Flugmaschinenwerke.

== Design and development ==
The Otto A.G.O. (Aeromotor Gustav Otto) 80/100 hp engine was designed by Hans Geisenhof in 1911 at the Gustav Otto Flugmaschinenwerke. It had a bore and stroke of 140 mm × 150 mm (5.51 in × 5.91 in) and was rated at 80 / 100 hp (60 / 75 kW) with a normal speed of 1,200 rpm.

As with the smaller Otto A.G.O. 50 hp engine, the cylinders were cast separately from iron and then machined. They were grouped together to a single block, joined at their cooling jackets by means of flanges and bolts. The conjoined cylinder block incorporated a single intake duct running through the water jackets, fed by a single carburettor which was installed at the control end. There were two overhead valves per cylinder, which were operated via pushrods and rocker arms from the camshaft on the left side of the engine, with the camshaft being driven from the crankshaft by spur gears at the control end. The magneto also was located at the control end of the engine to the right, driven from the crankshaft via an intermediate spur gear.

The crankshaft was supported by three intermediate and two outer plain bearings, with two additional thrust ball bearings at the propeller end. Lubrication was pressure fed, with an oil pump feeding oil to the crankshaft bearings.

In 1912 the engine was also produced as a six-cylinder with the same cylinder dimensions, rated at 100 / 130 hp (75 / 97 kW).

== Variants ==
Otto A.G.O. 80/100 hp four-cylinder
(1911), 80–100 hp (60–75 kW), 130 kg (287 lb), 140 mm × 150 mm (5.5 in × 5.9 in) bore and stroke
Otto A.G.O. 100/130 hp six-cylinder
(1912), 100–130 hp (75–97 kW), 160 kg (353 lb), 140 mm × 150 mm (5.5 in × 5.9 in) bore and stroke

== Specifications (Otto A.G.O. 80/100 hp) ==
Data from Quittner

=== General characteristics ===
- Type: four-cylinder, water-cooled in-line piston engine
- Bore: 140 mm (5.51 in)
- Stroke: 150 mm (5.91 in)
- Displacement: 9.24 L (564 cu in)
- Dry weight: 130 kg (287 lb)
- Designer: Hans Geisenhof

=== Components ===
- Valvetrain: one camshaft in the engine block, two overhead valves per cylinder actuated via roller tappets, pushrods and rocker arms
- Cooling system: Water-cooled
- Reduction gear: Direct-drive

=== Performance ===
- Power output: 80–100 hp (60–75 kW)

== See also ==
Related development

- Otto A.G.O. 50 hp

Related lists

- List of aircraft engines
