= Ruppertshofen =

Ruppertshofen refers to several places in Germany:

- Ruppertshofen, Baden-Württemberg
- Ruppertshofen, Rhineland-Palatinate
