= Ehr, Germany =

Ehr
- Municipality
- Coat of arms

- Location of Ehr within Rhein-Lahn-Kreis district
- Interactive map of Ehr
- Location within Germany Location within Rhineland-Palatinate
- Coordinates: 50°14′17.5056″N 7°47′3.2352″E
- Country: Germany
- State: Rhineland-Palatinate
- District: Rhein-Lahn-Kreis
- Municipal assoc.: Nastätten

Government
  - Mayor (2019–24): Klaus Brand

Area
  - Total: 1.21 km^{2} (0.47 sq mi)
- Elevation: 260 m (850 ft)

Population (2025-12-31)
  - Total: 86
  - Density: 71/km^{2} (180/sq mi)
- Time zone: UTC+01:00 (CET)
  - Summer (DST): UTC+02:00 (CEST)
- Postal codes: 56357
- Dialling codes: 06776
- Vehicle registration: EMS, DIZ, GOH

Ehr (German pronunciation: [eːɐ̯]) is a municipality in the district of Rhein-Lahn, in Rhineland-Palatinate, in western Germany.

== Transport ==
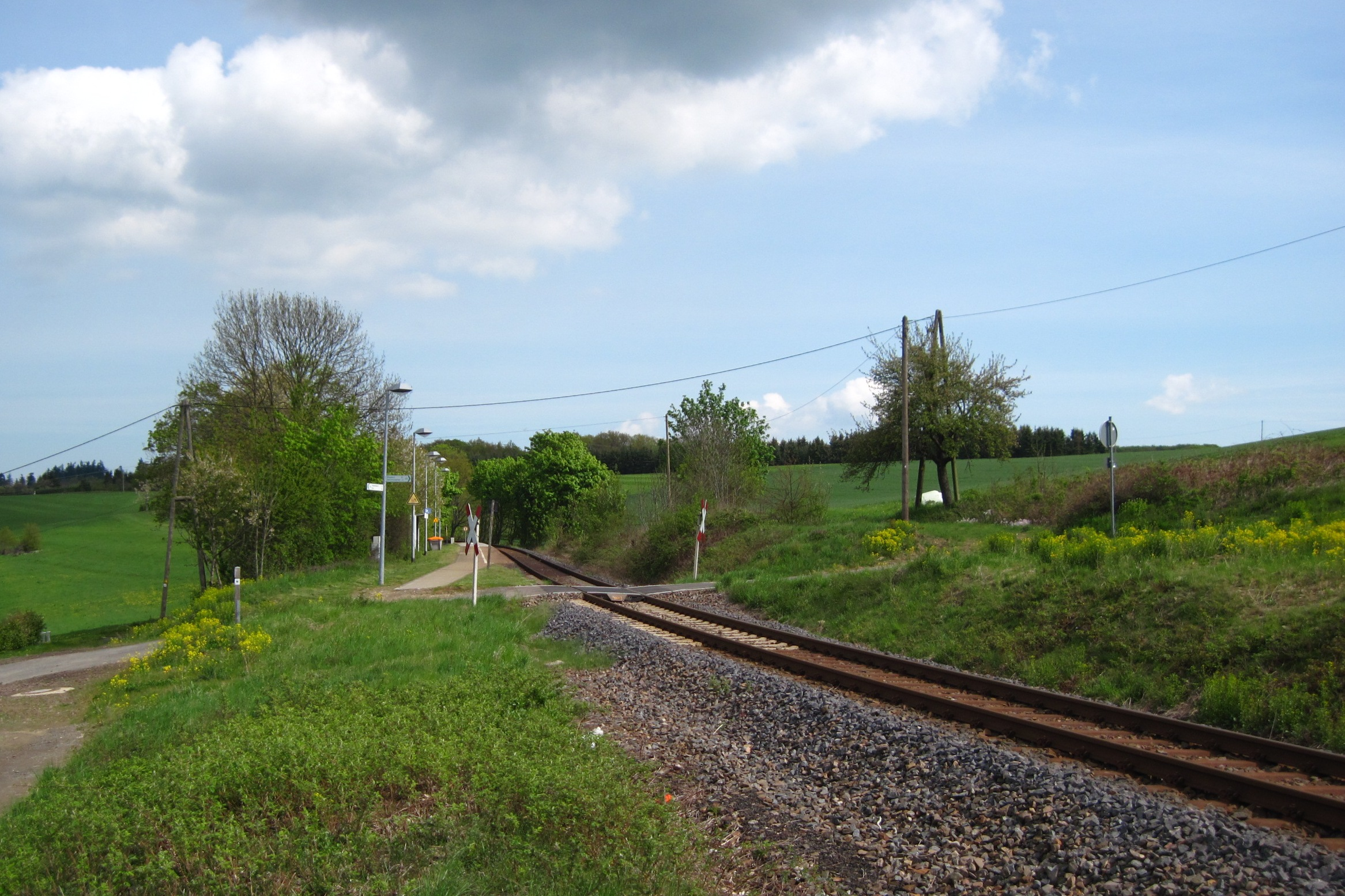
Ehr stop

Ehr has a stop at the Hunsrückbahn (RB37), which runs from Boppard to Emmelshausen. Ehr is located in the area of the transport association Verkehrsverbund Rhein-Mosel (VRM), zone number 696.
