= Oelsberg =

- Municipality
- Coat of arms

- Location of Oelsberg within Rhein-Lahn-Kreis district
- Interactive map of Oelsberg
- Location within Germany Location within Rhineland-Palatinate
- Coordinates: 50°11′51″N 7°50′15″E
- Country: Germany
- State: Rhineland-Palatinate
- District: Rhein-Lahn-Kreis
- Municipal assoc.: Nastätten

Government
  - Mayor (2019–24): Tanja Steeg

Area
  - Total: 4.02 km^{2} (1.55 sq mi)
- Elevation: 280 m (920 ft)

Population (2025-12-31)
  - Total: 562
  - Density: 140/km^{2} (362/sq mi)
- Time zone: UTC+01:00 (CET)
  - Summer (DST): UTC+02:00 (CEST)
- Postal codes: 56357
- Dialling codes: 06772
- Vehicle registration: EMS, DIZ, GOH
- Website: www.oelsberg.de

Oelsberg (pronounced [ˈœlsˌbɛʁk]) is a municipality in the district of Rhein-Lahn, in Rhineland-Palatinate, in western Germany.
