= Eschbach, Rhein-Lahn =

Eschbach
- Municipality
- Coat of arms

- Location of Eschbach within Rhein-Lahn-Kreis district
- Interactive map of Eschbach
- Location within Germany Location within Rhineland-Palatinate
- Coordinates: 50°12′50.11″N 7°43′36.31″E
- Country: Germany
- State: Rhineland-Palatinate
- District: Rhein-Lahn-Kreis
- Municipal assoc.: Nastätten

Government
  - Mayor (2019–24): Carsten Göller

Area
  - Total: 2.58 km^{2} (1.00 sq mi)
- Elevation: 360 m (1,180 ft)

Population (2025-12-31)
  - Total: 173
  - Density: 67.1/km^{2} (174/sq mi)
- Time zone: UTC+01:00 (CET)
  - Summer (DST): UTC+02:00 (CEST)
- Postal codes: 56357
- Dialling codes: 06771
- Vehicle registration: EMS, DIZ, GOH

Eschbach (German pronunciation: [ˈɛʃbax]) is a municipality in the district of Rhein-Lahn, in Rhineland-Palatinate, in western Germany.
