= Berg, Rhein-Lahn =

Berg
- Municipality
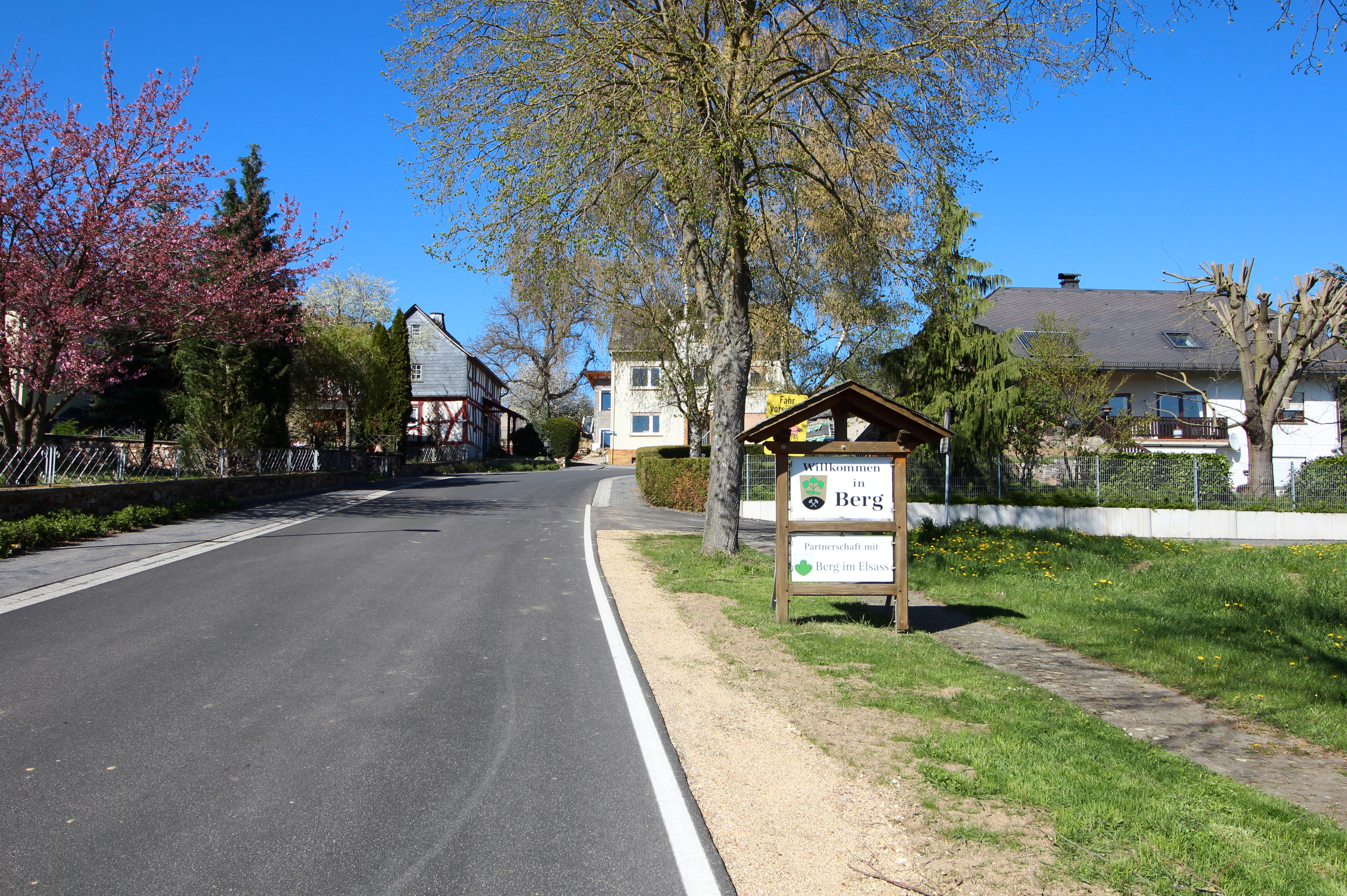

- Coat of arms

- Location of Berg within Rhein-Lahn-Kreis district
- Interactive map of Berg
- Location within Germany Location within Rhineland-Palatinate
- Coordinates: 50°15′15.21″N 7°48′45.9″E
- Country: Germany
- State: Rhineland-Palatinate
- District: Rhein-Lahn-Kreis
- Municipal assoc.: Nastätten

Government
  - Mayor (2019–24): Heiko Singhof

Area
  - Total: 3.32 km^{2} (1.28 sq mi)
- Elevation: 290 m (950 ft)

Population (2025-12-31)
  - Total: 254
  - Density: 76.5/km^{2} (198/sq mi)
- Time zone: UTC+01:00 (CET)
  - Summer (DST): UTC+02:00 (CEST)
- Postal codes: 56357
- Dialling codes: 06772
- Vehicle registration: EMS, DIZ, GOH

Berg (German pronunciation: [bɛʁk]) is a municipality in the district of Rhein-Lahn, in Rhineland-Palatinate, in western Germany.
