= Rhein-Lahn-Kreis =

Coordinates: 50°16′N 7°52′E

Rhein-Lahn
- District
- Flag Coat of arms
- Country: Germany
- State: Rhineland-Palatinate
- Capital: Bad Ems

Government
  - District admin.: Jörg Denninghoff (SPD)

Area
  - Total: 782.34 km^{2} (302.06 sq mi)

Population (31 December 2025)
  - Total: 125,160
  - Density: 159.98/km^{2} (414.35/sq mi)
- Time zone: UTC+01:00 (CET)
  - Summer (DST): UTC+02:00 (CEST)
- Vehicle registration: EMS, DIZ, GOH
- Website: rhein-lahn-kreis.de

Rhein-Lahn-Kreis is a district (Kreis) in the east of Rhineland-Palatinate, Germany. Neighboring districts are (from north clockwise) Westerwaldkreis, Limburg-Weilburg, Rheingau-Taunus, Mainz-Bingen, Rhein-Hunsrück, Mayen-Koblenz, and the district-free city Koblenz.

== History ==
With the Congress of Vienna the area was added to the duchy of Nassau. When Nassau lost independence in 1866 it was added to Prussia, who then in 1867 created the Regierungsbezirk Wiesbaden, and as parts of it the two districts Rheingaukreis and Unterlahnkreis. The Rheingaukreis became the district St. Goarshausen in 1885. In 1969 the two districts were merged into the new Rhein-Lahn district.

== Geography ==
The name of the district already mentions the two biggest rivers of the district. The Rhine forms the boundary to the west, its narrow valley is used for wine cultivation. The Lahn flows through the northern part of the district until it joins the Rhine near Lahnstein. In the southern part of the district are the hills of the Taunus.

== Coat of arms ==
The coat of arms shows a lion.

== Towns and municipalities ==
Verband-free town
1. Lahnstein

Verbandsgemeinden
1. Aar-Einrich; 1. Allendorf; 2. Berghausen; 3. Berndroth; 4. Biebrich; 5. Bremberg; 6. Burgschwalbach; 7. Dörsdorf; 8. Ebertshausen; 9. Eisighofen; 10. Ergeshausen; 11. Flacht; 12. Gutenacker; 13. Hahnstätten; 14. Herold; 15. Kaltenholzhausen; 16. Katzenelnbogen^{1, 2}; 17. Klingelbach; 18. Kördorf; 19. Lohrheim; 20. Mittelfischbach; 21. Mudershausen; 22. Netzbach; 23. Niederneisen; 24. Niedertiefenbach; 25. Oberfischbach; 26. Oberneisen; 27. Reckenroth; 28. Rettert; 29. Roth; 30. Schiesheim; 31. Schönborn	2. Bad Ems-Nassau; 1. Arzbach; 2. Attenhausen; 3. Bad Ems^{1, 2}; 4. Becheln; 5. Dausenau; 6. Dessighofen; 7. Dienethal; 8. Dornholzhausen; 9. Fachbach; 10. Frücht; 11. Geisig; 12. Hömberg; 13. Kemmenau; 14. Lollschied; 15. Miellen; 16. Misselberg; 17. Nievern; 18. Nassau^{2}; 19. Obernhof; 20. Oberwies; 21. Pohl; 22. Schweighausen; 23. Seelbach; 24. Singhofen; 25. Sulzbach; 26. Weinähr; 27. Winden; 28. Zimmerschied	3. Diez; 1. Altendiez; 2. Aull; 3. Balduinstein; 4. Birlenbach; 5. Charlottenberg; 6. Cramberg; 7. Diez^{1, 2}; 8. Dörnberg; 9. Eppenrod; 10. Geilnau; 11. Gückingen; 12. Hambach; 13. Heistenbach; 14. Hirschberg; 15. Holzappel; 16. Holzheim; 17. Horhausen; 18. Isselbach; 19. Langenscheid; 20. Laurenburg; 21. Scheidt; 22. Steinsberg; 23. Wasenbach	4. Loreley; 1. Auel; 2. Bornich; 3. Braubach^{2}; 4. Dachsenhausen; 5. Dahlheim; 6. Dörscheid; 7. Filsen; 8. Kamp-Bornhofen; 9. Kaub^{2}; 10. Kestert; 11. Lierschied; 12. Lykershausen; 13. Nochern; 14. Osterspai; 15. Patersberg; 16. Prath; 17. Reichenberg; 18. Reitzenhain; 19. Sankt Goarshausen^{1, 2}; 20. Sauerthal; 21. Weisel; 22. Weyer	5. Nastätten; 1. Berg; 2. Bettendorf; 3. Bogel; 4. Buch; 5. Diethardt; 6. Ehr; 7. Endlichhofen; 8. Eschbach; 9. Gemmerich; 10. Hainau; 11. Himmighofen; 12. Holzhausen an der Haide; 13. Hunzel; 14. Kasdorf; 15. Kehlbach; 16. Lautert; 17. Lipporn; 18. Marienfels; 19. Miehlen; 20. Nastätten^{1, 2}; 21. Niederbachheim; 22. Niederwallmenach; 23. Oberbachheim; 24. Obertiefenbach; 25. Oberwallmenach; 26. Oelsberg; 27. Rettershain; 28. Ruppertshofen; 29. Strüth; 30. Weidenbach; 31. Welterod; 32. Winterwerb
^{1}seat of the Verbandsgemeinde; ^{2}town

== Transport ==
Verkehrsverbund Rhein-Mosel

There are two railway linen in service for public transport as well as fright traffic, which are the Lahn Valley Railway, served by RB23 and RE25 as well as the Rechte Rheinstrecke, served by RB10 in public transport.

The Aar Valley Railway is out of service for public transport and fright transport in the Rhein-Lahn district, although Draisine rides take place, the base for the Draisine rides is Oberneisen station, operated by the interest group Arbeitskreis Aartalbahn e. V.

The former Nassauische Kleinbahn also served a line from Zollhaus to Sankt Goarshausen, from Nastätten to Oberlahnstein including a line from Nastätten to Braubach and from in the district in the past, nowadays there's no service anymore and the tracks primarily deconstructed.

Rhein-Lahn-Kreis is member in the transport association Verkehrsverbund Rhein-Mosel (VRM).
