= Niederbachheim =

- Municipality
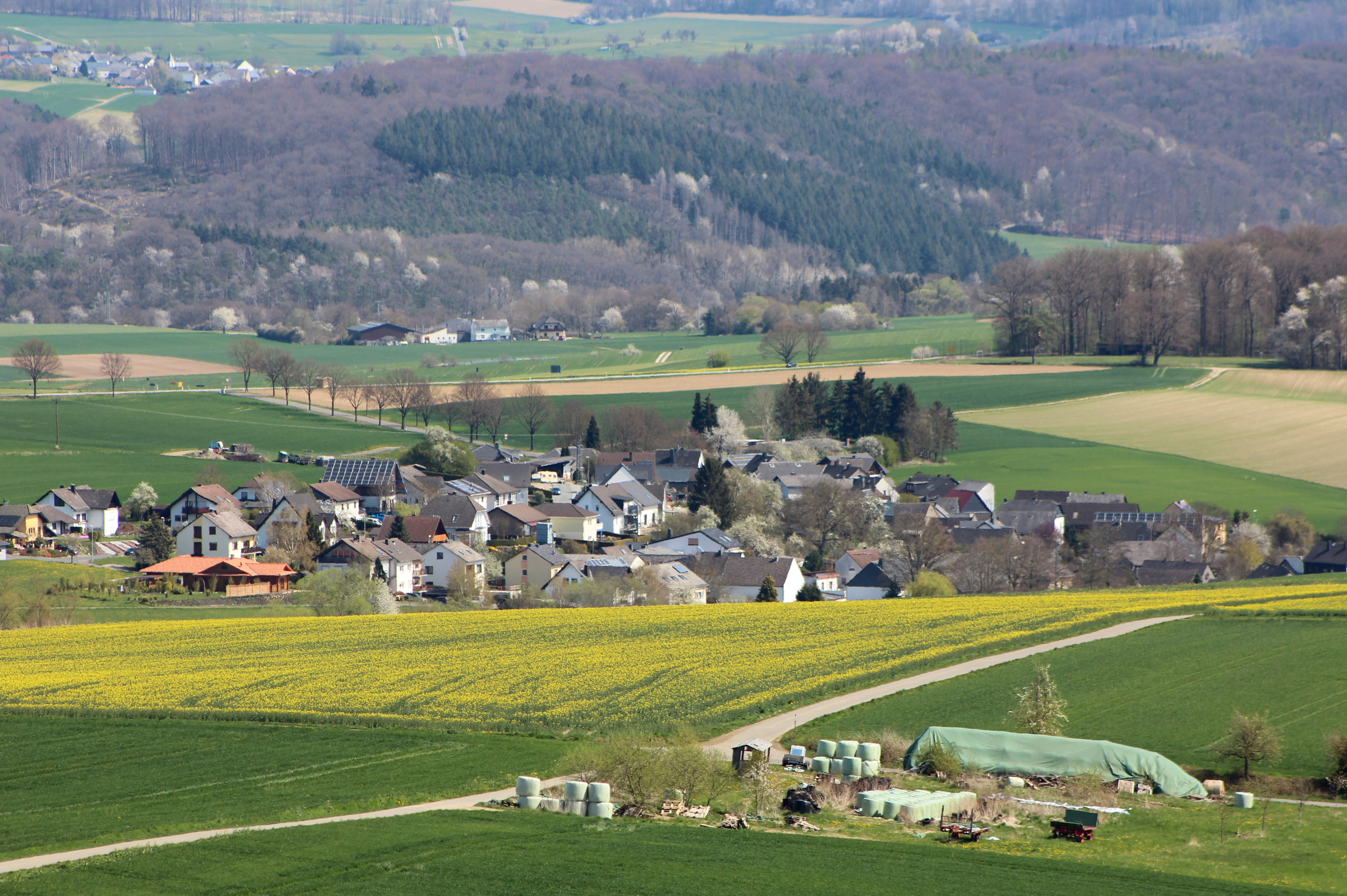

- Coat of arms

- Location of Niederbachheim within Rhein-Lahn-Kreis district
- Interactive map of Niederbachheim
- Location within Germany Location within Rhineland-Palatinate
- Coordinates: 50°14′56″N 7°45′53″E
- Country: Germany
- State: Rhineland-Palatinate
- District: Rhein-Lahn-Kreis
- Municipal assoc.: Nastätten

Government
  - Mayor (2019–24): Volker Palm

Area
  - Total: 2.93 km^{2} (1.13 sq mi)
- Elevation: 270 m (890 ft)

Population (2025-12-31)
  - Total: 250
  - Density: 85/km^{2} (220/sq mi)
- Time zone: UTC+01:00 (CET)
  - Summer (DST): UTC+02:00 (CEST)
- Postal codes: 56357
- Dialling codes: 06776
- Vehicle registration: EMS, DIZ, GOH

Niederbachheim is a municipality in the district of Rhein-Lahn, in Rhineland-Palatinate, in western Germany.
