= Kehlbach (Rhineland-Palatinate) =

- Municipality
- Location of Kehlbach within Rhein-Lahn-Kreis district
- Interactive map of Kehlbach
- Location within Germany Location within Rhineland-Palatinate
- Coordinates: 50°15′33″N 7°45′34″E
- Country: Germany
- State: Rhineland-Palatinate
- District: Rhein-Lahn-Kreis
- Municipal assoc.: Nastätten

Government
  - Mayor (2019–24): Rainer Thelen

Area
  - Total: 2.13 km^{2} (0.82 sq mi)
- Elevation: 295 m (968 ft)

Population (2025-12-31)
  - Total: 174
  - Density: 81.7/km^{2} (212/sq mi)
- Time zone: UTC+01:00 (CET)
  - Summer (DST): UTC+02:00 (CEST)
- Postal codes: 56355
- Dialling codes: 06776
- Vehicle registration: EMS, DIZ, GOH

Kehlbach (German pronunciation: [ˈkeːlbax]) is a municipality in the district of Rhein-Lahn, in Rhineland-Palatinate, in western Germany.
