= Buch, Rhein-Lahn =

Buch
- Municipality
- Coat of arms

- Location of Buch within Rhein-Lahn-Kreis district
- Interactive map of Buch
- Location within Germany Location within Rhineland-Palatinate
- Coordinates: 50°12′20.90″N 7°52′25.67″E
- Country: Germany
- State: Rhineland-Palatinate
- District: Rhein-Lahn-Kreis
- Municipal assoc.: Nastätten

Government
  - Mayor (2019–24): Norbert Hißnauer

Area
  - Total: 4.15 km^{2} (1.60 sq mi)
- Elevation: 290 m (950 ft)

Population (2025-12-31)
  - Total: 609
  - Density: 147/km^{2} (380/sq mi)
- Time zone: UTC+01:00 (CET)
  - Summer (DST): UTC+02:00 (CEST)
- Postal codes: 56357
- Dialling codes: 06772
- Vehicle registration: EMS, DIZ, GOH
- Website: www.buch-taunus.de

Buch (German pronunciation: [buːx]) is a municipality in the district of Rhein-Lahn, in Rhineland-Palatinate, in western Germany.
