= Niederwallmenach =

- Municipality
- Coat of arms

- Location of Niederwallmenach within Rhein-Lahn-Kreis district
- Interactive map of Niederwallmenach
- Location within Germany Location within Rhineland-Palatinate
- Coordinates: 50°9′57″N 7°48′47″E
- Country: Germany
- State: Rhineland-Palatinate
- District: Rhein-Lahn-Kreis
- Municipal assoc.: Nastätten

Government
  - Mayor (2019–24): Peggy Beyer

Area
  - Total: 6.88 km^{2} (2.66 sq mi)
- Elevation: 332 m (1,089 ft)

Population (2025-12-31)
  - Total: 432
  - Density: 62.8/km^{2} (163/sq mi)
- Time zone: UTC+01:00 (CET)
  - Summer (DST): UTC+02:00 (CEST)
- Postal codes: 56357
- Dialling codes: 06772
- Vehicle registration: EMS, DIZ, GOH
- Website: www.niederwallmenach.de

Niederwallmenach is a village and a municipality in the district of Rhein-Lahn, in Rhineland-Palatinate, in western Germany.
