= Himmighofen =

- Municipality
- Coat of arms

- Location of Himmighofen within Rhein-Lahn-Kreis district
- Interactive map of Himmighofen
- Location within Germany Location within Rhineland-Palatinate
- Coordinates: 50°12′41.37″N 7°45′57.28″E
- Country: Germany
- State: Rhineland-Palatinate
- District: Rhein-Lahn-Kreis
- Municipal assoc.: Nastätten

Government
  - Mayor (2019–24): Holger Breithaupt

Area
  - Total: 5.03 km^{2} (1.94 sq mi)
- Elevation: 325 m (1,066 ft)

Population (2025-12-31)
  - Total: 331
  - Density: 65.8/km^{2} (170/sq mi)
- Time zone: UTC+01:00 (CET)
  - Summer (DST): UTC+02:00 (CEST)
- Postal codes: 56357
- Dialling codes: 06772
- Vehicle registration: EMS, DIZ, GOH

Himmighofen is a municipality in the district of Rhein-Lahn, in Rhineland-Palatinate, in western Germany.
