= Nastätten (Verbandsgemeinde) =

Municipality in Rhineland-Palatinate, Germany

- Verbandsgemeinde
- Location of Nastätten within Rhein-Lahn-Kreis district
- Interactive map of Nastätten
- Location within Germany Location within Rhineland-Palatinate
- Coordinates: 50°12′N 7°51′E
- Country: Germany
- State: Rhineland-Palatinate
- District: Rhein-Lahn-Kreis
- Seat: Nastätten
- Subdivisions: 32 municipalities

Area
  - Total: 155.57 km^{2} (60.07 sq mi)

Population (2025-12-31)
  - Total: 16,612
  - Density: 106.78/km^{2} (276.56/sq mi)
- Time zone: UTC+01:00 (CET)
  - Summer (DST): UTC+02:00 (CEST)
- Website: www.vgnastaetten.de

Nastätten is a Verbandsgemeinde ("collective municipality") in the Rhein-Lahn-Kreis, in Rhineland-Palatinate, Germany. Its seat is in Nastätten.

The Verbandsgemeinde Nastätten consists of the following Ortsgemeinden ("local municipalities"):

1. Berg
2. Bettendorf
3. Bogel
4. Buch
5. Diethardt
6. Ehr
7. Endlichhofen
8. Eschbach
9. Gemmerich
10. Hainau
11. Himmighofen
12. Holzhausen an der Haide
13. Hunzel
14. Kasdorf
15. Kehlbach
16. Lautert
17. Lipporn
18. Marienfels
19. Miehlen
20. Nastätten
21. Niederbachheim
22. Niederwallmenach
23. Oberbachheim
24. Obertiefenbach
25. Oberwallmenach
26. Oelsberg
27. Rettershain
28. Ruppertshofen
29. Strüth
30. Weidenbach
31. Welterod
32. Winterwerb
