= Endlichhofen =

- Municipality
- Coat of arms

- Location of Endlichhofen within Rhein-Lahn-Kreis district
- Interactive map of Endlichhofen
- Location within Germany Location within Rhineland-Palatinate
- Coordinates: 50°12′7.8732″N 7°49′4.8432″E
- Country: Germany
- State: Rhineland-Palatinate
- District: Rhein-Lahn-Kreis
- Municipal assoc.: Nastätten

Government
  - Mayor (2019–24): Hartmut Christ

Area
  - Total: 2.24 km^{2} (0.86 sq mi)
- Elevation: 320 m (1,050 ft)

Population (2025-12-31)
  - Total: 146
  - Density: 65.2/km^{2} (169/sq mi)
- Time zone: UTC+01:00 (CET)
  - Summer (DST): UTC+02:00 (CEST)
- Postal codes: 56355
- Dialling codes: 06772
- Vehicle registration: EMS, DIZ, GOH
- Website: www.endlichhofen.de

Endlichhofen (German pronunciation: [ɛntlɪçˈhoːfn̩]) is a municipality in the district of Rhein-Lahn, in Rhineland-Palatinate, in western Germany.
