= Bogel =

- Municipality
- Coat of arms

- Location of Bogel within Rhein-Lahn-Kreis district
- Interactive map of Bogel
- Location within Germany Location within Rhineland-Palatinate
- Coordinates: 50°11′25.8″N 7°47′58.87″E
- Country: Germany
- State: Rhineland-Palatinate
- District: Rhein-Lahn-Kreis
- Municipal assoc.: Nastätten

Government
  - Mayor (2019–24): Arno Diefenbach

Area
  - Total: 5.34 km^{2} (2.06 sq mi)
- Elevation: 350 m (1,150 ft)

Population (2025-12-31)
  - Total: 821
  - Density: 154/km^{2} (398/sq mi)
- Time zone: UTC+01:00 (CET)
  - Summer (DST): UTC+02:00 (CEST)
- Postal codes: 56357
- Dialling codes: 06772
- Vehicle registration: EMS, DIZ, GOH
- Website: www.bogel.de

Bogel (German pronunciation: [ˈboːɡl̩]) is a municipality in the district of Rhein-Lahn, in Rhineland-Palatinate, in western Germany.
