= Welterod =

- Municipality
- Coat of arms

- Location of Welterod within Rhein-Lahn-Kreis district
- Interactive map of Welterod
- Location within Germany Location within Rhineland-Palatinate
- Coordinates: 50°7′57″N 7°53′22″E
- Country: Germany
- State: Rhineland-Palatinate
- District: Rhein-Lahn-Kreis
- Municipal assoc.: Nastätten

Government
  - Mayor (2019–24): Wilfried Kehraus

Area
  - Total: 9.94 km^{2} (3.84 sq mi)
- Elevation: 420 m (1,380 ft)

Population (2025-12-31)
  - Total: 455
  - Density: 45.8/km^{2} (119/sq mi)
- Time zone: UTC+01:00 (CET)
  - Summer (DST): UTC+02:00 (CEST)
- Postal codes: 56357
- Dialling codes: 06775
- Vehicle registration: EMS, DIZ, GOH
- Website: www.welterod.de

Welterod is a municipality in the district of Rhein-Lahn, in Rhineland-Palatinate, in western Germany.
