= Lautert =

- Municipality
- Coat of arms

- Location of Lautert within Rhein-Lahn-Kreis district
- Interactive map of Lautert
- Location within Germany Location within Rhineland-Palatinate
- Coordinates: 50°10′8″N 7°50′27″E
- Country: Germany
- State: Rhineland-Palatinate
- District: Rhein-Lahn-Kreis
- Municipal assoc.: Nastätten

Government
  - Mayor (2019–24): Günter Klamp

Area
  - Total: 3.56 km^{2} (1.37 sq mi)
- Elevation: 390 m (1,280 ft)

Population (2025-12-31)
  - Total: 251
  - Density: 70.5/km^{2} (183/sq mi)
- Time zone: UTC+01:00 (CET)
  - Summer (DST): UTC+02:00 (CEST)
- Postal codes: 56355
- Dialling codes: 06772
- Vehicle registration: EMS, DIZ, GOH
- Website: www.lautert-taunus.de

Lautert is a municipality in the district of Rhein-Lahn, in Rhineland-Palatinate, in western Germany.
