= Winterwerb =

- Municipality
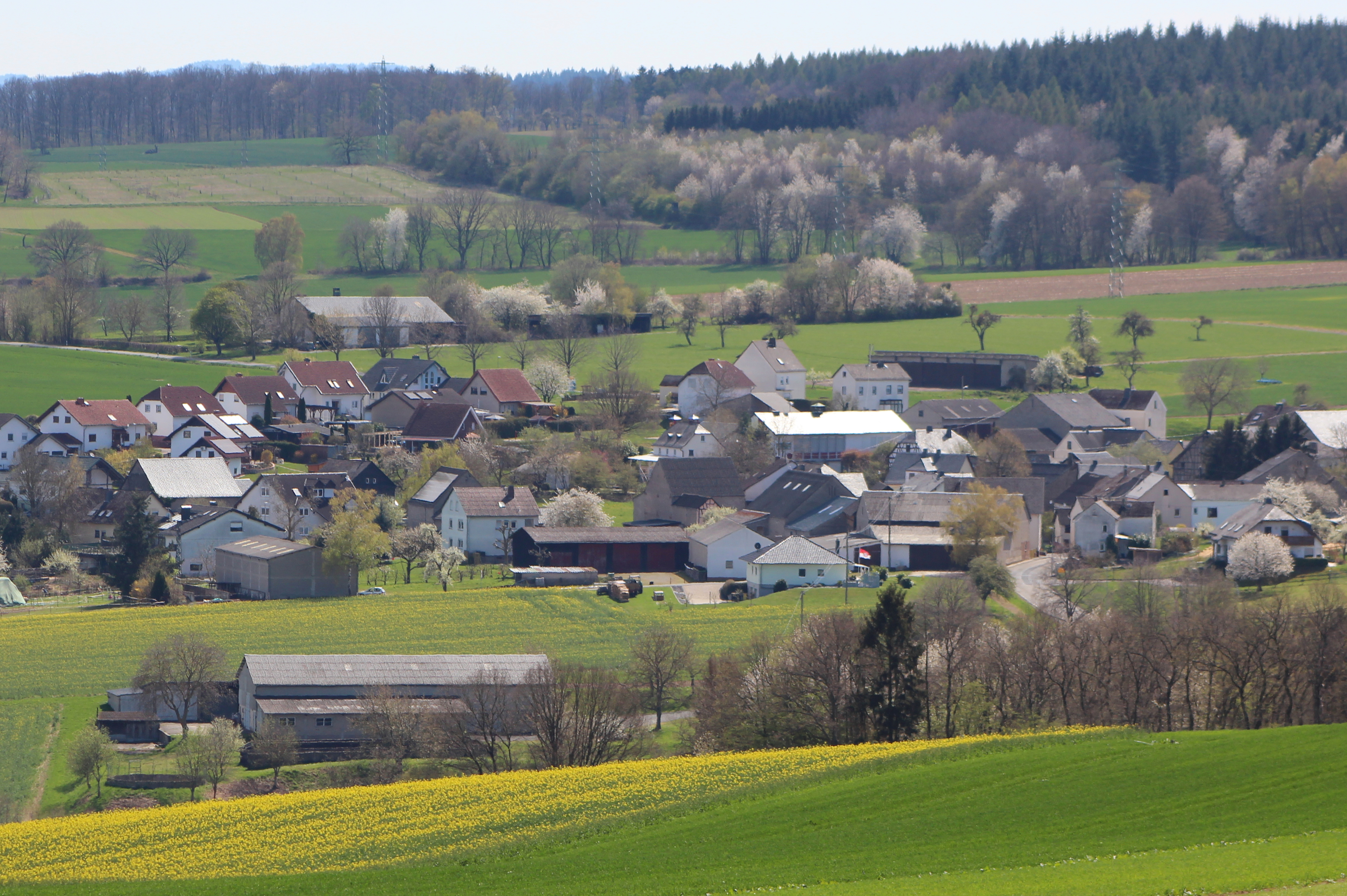

- Coat of arms

- Location of Winterwerb within Rhein-Lahn-Kreis district
- Interactive map of Winterwerb
- Location within Germany Location within Rhineland-Palatinate
- Coordinates: 50°14′17″N 7°44′28″E
- Country: Germany
- State: Rhineland-Palatinate
- District: Rhein-Lahn-Kreis
- Municipal assoc.: Nastätten

Government
  - Mayor (2019–24): Gerhard Luhofer

Area
  - Total: 3.01 km^{2} (1.16 sq mi)
- Elevation: 340 m (1,120 ft)

Population (2025-12-31)
  - Total: 148
  - Density: 49.2/km^{2} (127/sq mi)
- Time zone: UTC+01:00 (CET)
  - Summer (DST): UTC+02:00 (CEST)
- Postal codes: 56355
- Dialling codes: 06776
- Vehicle registration: EMS, DIZ, GOH

Winterwerb is a municipality in the district of Rhein-Lahn, Rhineland-Palatinate, western Germany.
