= Weidenbach, Rhein-Lahn =

Weidenbach
- Municipality
- Coat of arms

- Location of Weidenbach within Rhein-Lahn-Kreis district
- Interactive map of Weidenbach
- Location within Germany Location within Rhineland-Palatinate
- Coordinates: 50°9′21″N 7°53′00″E
- Country: Germany
- State: Rhineland-Palatinate
- District: Rhein-Lahn-Kreis
- Municipal assoc.: Nastätten

Government
  - Mayor (2019–24): Helmut Maxeiner

Area
  - Total: 2.24 km^{2} (0.86 sq mi)
- Elevation: 380 m (1,250 ft)

Population (2025-12-31)
  - Total: 109
  - Density: 48.7/km^{2} (126/sq mi)
- Time zone: UTC+01:00 (CET)
  - Summer (DST): UTC+02:00 (CEST)
- Postal codes: 56355
- Dialling codes: 06775
- Vehicle registration: EMS, DIZ, GOH

Weidenbach (German pronunciation: [ˈvaɪdn̩bax]) is a municipality in the district of Rhein-Lahn, in Rhineland-Palatinate, in western Germany. Its municipal council consists of six members elected by majority vote, and headed by the honorary mayor, or chairman.

== History ==
Part of the Landgraviate of Hesse-Kassel since 1583, it was occupied by France between 1806 and 1813. After the Congress of Vienna, it was given to the Duchy of Nassau. By 1866, the territory was under Prussian control. It has been part of Rhineland-Palatinate since 1946.
