= Obertiefenbach =

- Municipality
- Coat of arms

- Location of Obertiefenbach within Rhein-Lahn-Kreis district
- Interactive map of Obertiefenbach
- Location within Germany Location within Rhineland-Palatinate
- Coordinates: 50°14′38″N 7°53′25″E
- Country: Germany
- State: Rhineland-Palatinate
- District: Rhein-Lahn-Kreis
- Municipal assoc.: Nastätten

Government
  - Mayor (2019–24): Erhard Back

Area
  - Total: 5.77 km^{2} (2.23 sq mi)
- Elevation: 350 m (1,150 ft)

Population (2025-12-31)
  - Total: 384
  - Density: 66.6/km^{2} (172/sq mi)
- Time zone: UTC+01:00 (CET)
  - Summer (DST): UTC+02:00 (CEST)
- Postal codes: 56357
- Dialling codes: 06772
- Vehicle registration: EMS, DIZ, GOH

Obertiefenbach is a municipality in the district of Rhein-Lahn, in Rhineland-Palatinate, in western Germany.
