= Diethardt =

- Municipality
- Coat of arms

- Location of Diethardt within Rhein-Lahn-Kreis district
- Interactive map of Diethardt
- Location within Germany Location within Rhineland-Palatinate
- Coordinates: 50°9′50″N 7°52′29″E
- Country: Germany
- State: Rhineland-Palatinate
- District: Rhein-Lahn-Kreis
- Municipal assoc.: Nastätten
- Subdivisions: 2

Government
  - Mayor (2019–24): Kerstin Reek-Berghäuser

Area
  - Total: 4.42 km^{2} (1.71 sq mi)
- Elevation: 300 m (980 ft)

Population (2025-12-31)
  - Total: 225
  - Density: 50.9/km^{2} (132/sq mi)
- Time zone: UTC+01:00 (CET)
  - Summer (DST): UTC+02:00 (CEST)
- Postal codes: 56355
- Dialling codes: 06772
- Vehicle registration: EMS, DIZ, GOH
- Website: www.diethardt.de

Diethardt is a municipality in the district of Rhein-Lahn, in Rhineland-Palatinate, in western Germany.
