= Kasdorf =

- Municipality
- Coat of arms

- Location of Kasdorf within Rhein-Lahn-Kreis district
- Interactive map of Kasdorf
- Location within Germany Location within Rhineland-Palatinate
- Coordinates: 50°12′28″N 7°47′7″E
- Country: Germany
- State: Rhineland-Palatinate
- District: Rhein-Lahn-Kreis
- Municipal assoc.: Nastätten

Government
  - Mayor (2019–24): Timo Bremser

Area
  - Total: 4.06 km^{2} (1.57 sq mi)
- Elevation: 298 m (978 ft)

Population (2025-12-31)
  - Total: 228
  - Density: 56.2/km^{2} (145/sq mi)
- Time zone: UTC+01:00 (CET)
  - Summer (DST): UTC+02:00 (CEST)
- Postal codes: 56357
- Dialling codes: 06772
- Vehicle registration: EMS, DIZ, GOH
- Website: www.gemeinde-kasdorf.de

Kasdorf is a municipality in the district of Rhein-Lahn, in Rhineland-Palatinate, in western Germany.
