= Gemmerich =

- Municipality
- Coat of arms

- Location of Gemmerich within Rhein-Lahn-Kreis district
- Interactive map of Gemmerich
- Location within Germany Location within Rhineland-Palatinate
- Coordinates: 50°13′40.0116″N 7°45′27.504″E
- Country: Germany
- State: Rhineland-Palatinate
- District: Rhein-Lahn-Kreis
- Municipal assoc.: Nastätten

Government
  - Mayor (2019–24): Mario Winterwerber

Area
  - Total: 6.79 km^{2} (2.62 sq mi)
- Elevation: 340 m (1,120 ft)

Population (2025-12-31)
  - Total: 544
  - Density: 80.1/km^{2} (208/sq mi)
- Time zone: UTC+01:00 (CET)
  - Summer (DST): UTC+02:00 (CEST)
- Postal codes: 56357
- Dialling codes: 06776
- Vehicle registration: EMS, DIZ, GOH

Gemmerich is a municipality in the district of Rhein-Lahn, in Rhineland-Palatinate, in western Germany.
