= Marienfels =

- Municipality
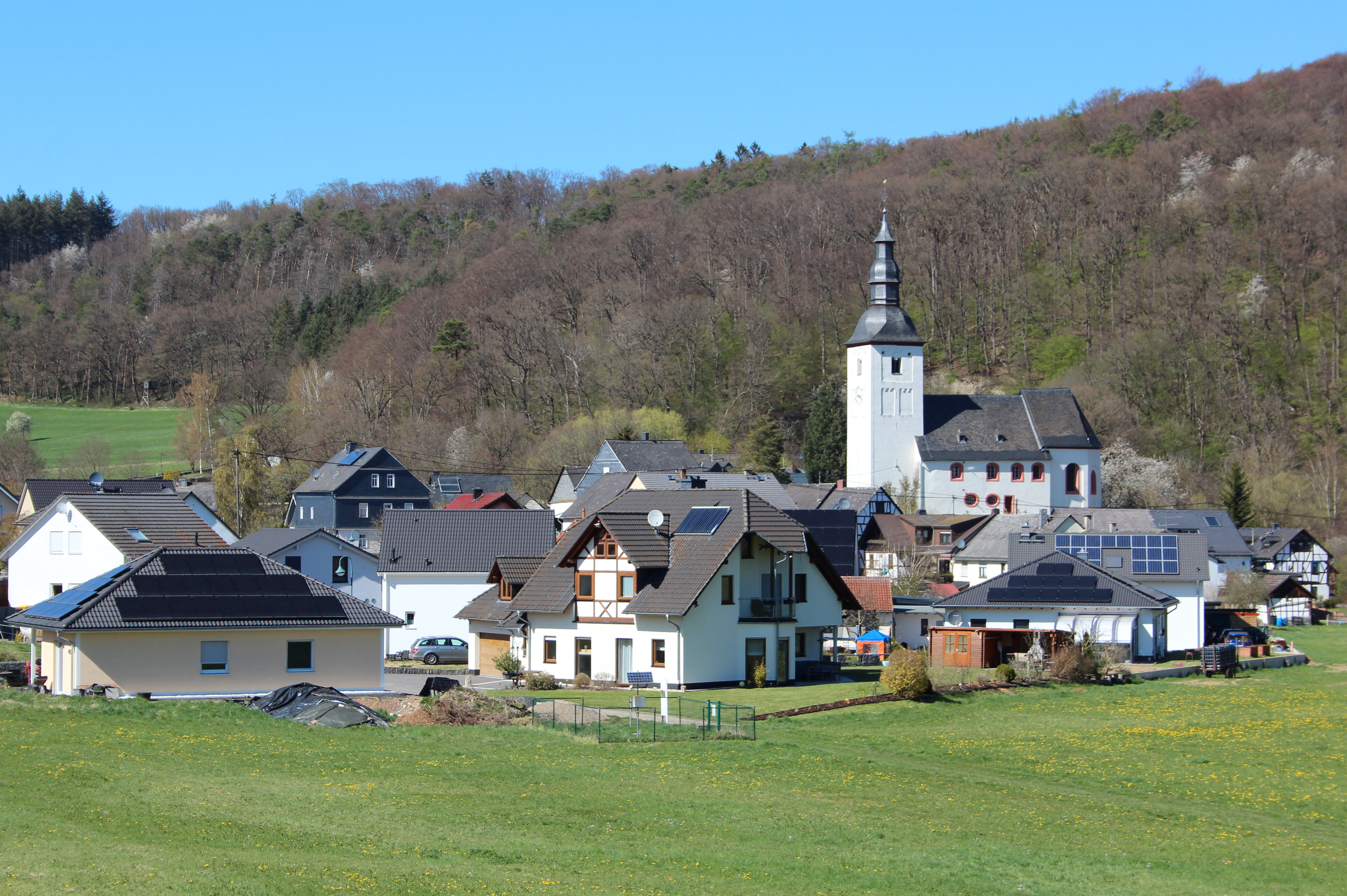

- Coat of arms

- Location of Marienfels within Rhein-Lahn-Kreis district
- Interactive map of Marienfels
- Location within Germany Location within Rhineland-Palatinate
- Coordinates: 50°14′29″N 7°48′50″E
- Country: Germany
- State: Rhineland-Palatinate
- District: Rhein-Lahn-Kreis
- Municipal assoc.: Nastätten

Government
  - Mayor (2019–24): Daniel Kupp

Area
  - Total: 3.84 km^{2} (1.48 sq mi)
- Elevation: 210 m (690 ft)

Population (2025-12-31)
  - Total: 318
  - Density: 82.8/km^{2} (214/sq mi)
- Time zone: UTC+01:00 (CET)
  - Summer (DST): UTC+02:00 (CEST)
- Postal codes: 56357
- Dialling codes: 06772
- Vehicle registration: EMS, DIZ, GOH
- Website: www.marienfels.de

Marienfels (German pronunciation: [maˈʁiːənˌfɛls]) is a municipality in the district of Rhein-Lahn, in Rhineland-Palatinate, in western Germany.
