= Harro Heuser =

German mathematician (1927–2011)

Harro Heuser (December 26, 1927 in Nastätten – February 21, 2011 in Bingen) was a German mathematician. In German-speaking countries he is best known for his popular two-volume introduction into real analysis, Lehrbuch der Analysis.

Heuser studied mathematics, physics and philosophy from 1948 to 1954 at the University of Tübingen to receive a teaching degree (Staatsexamen) and went on to study for his PhD, which he received in 1957. The advisor of his thesis, entitled Über Operatoren mit endlichen Defekten, was Helmut Wielandt. After receiving his PhD he moved to the University of Karlsruhe, where he received his habilitation in 1962. In 1963 he became a professor at the University of Kiel and in 1964 at the University of Mainz. Finally in spring 1969 he became a tenured professor at the University of Karlsruhe, where he remained until his retirement in 1996. He was also temporarily working as a visiting professor in the United States, Canada, Colombia and Italy.

== Works ==
- with Heinz Günther Tillmann as editors: Funkkolleg Mathematik. Eine Einführung in 2 Bänden. Fischer 1974
- Funktionalanalysis. Theorie und Anwendung. 1975; 4th edition, Teubner 2006, ISBN 978-3-8351-0026-8 (review)
  English edition: Functional Analysis. Wiley 1982, ISBN 978-0-471-10069-0
- Lehrbuch der Analysis - Teil 1. 1980; 17th edition, Teubner 2009, ISBN 978-3-8351-0131-9
- Lehrbuch der Analysis - Teil 2. 1981; 14th edition, Teubner 2008, ISBN 978-3-8351-0208-8
- with Hellmuth Wolf: Algebra, Funktionalanalysis und Codierung. Eine Einführung für Ingenieure. Teubner 1986, ISBN 978-3-519-02954-0
- Gewöhnliche Differentialgleichungen. Einführung in Lehre und Gebrauch. 1989; 6th edition, Teubner 2009, ISBN 978-3-519-42227-3
- Als die Götter lachen lernten. Griechische Denker verändern die Welt. 1992; 2nd edition, Piper 1997
- Die Magie der Zahlen. Von einer seltsamen Lust, die Welt zu ordnen. Herder 2003, ISBN 978-3-451-05439-6
- Der Physiker Gottes. Isaac Newton oder Die Revolution des Denkens. Herder 2005, ISBN 978-3-451-05591-1
- Unendlichkeiten. Nachrichten aus dem Grand Canyon des Geistes. Teubner 2007, ISBN 978-3-8351-0119-7
