= Miehlen =

- Municipality
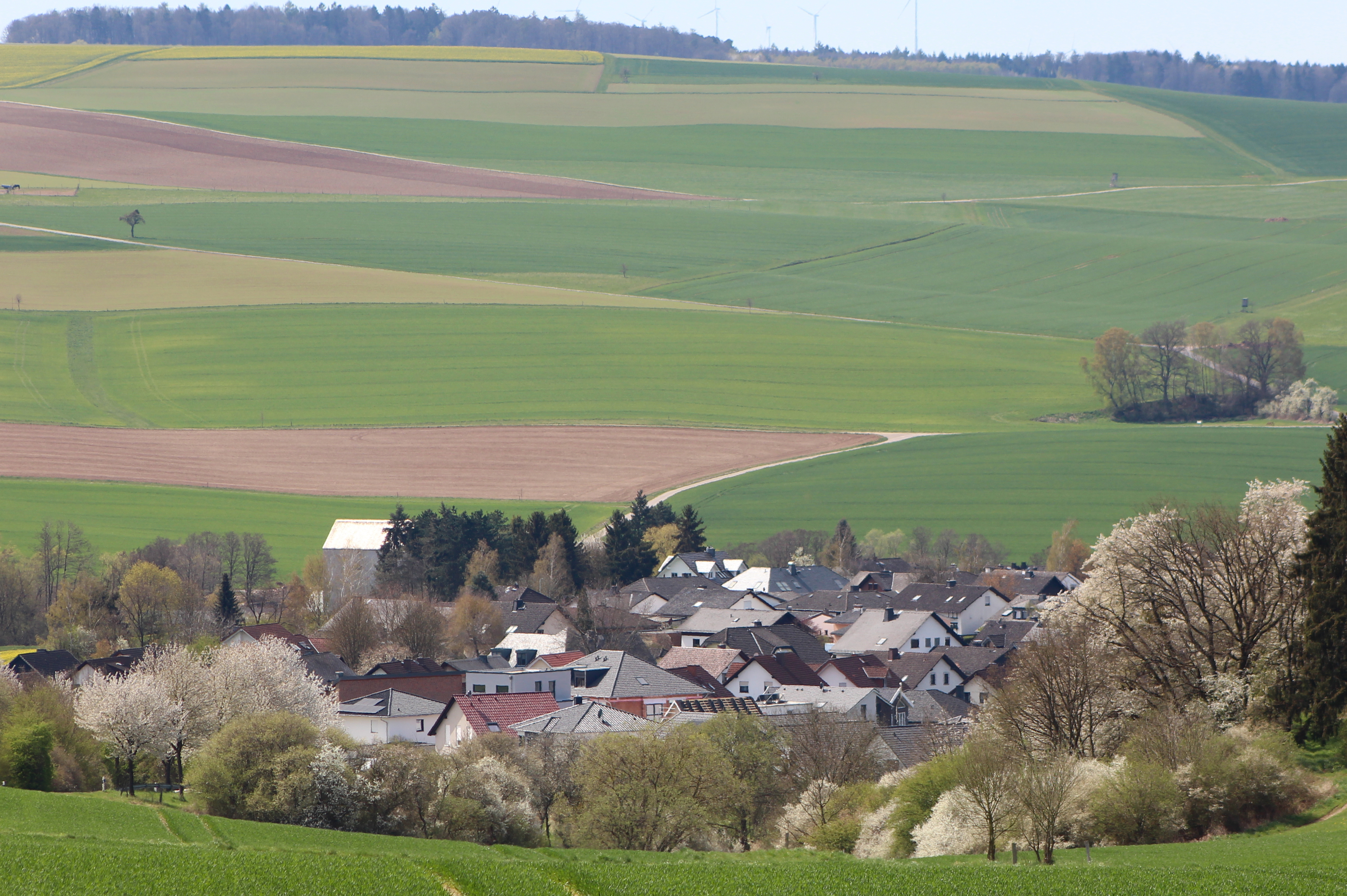

- Coat of arms

- Location of Miehlen within Rhein-Lahn-Kreis district
- Interactive map of Miehlen
- Location within Germany Location within Rhineland-Palatinate
- Coordinates: 50°13′31″N 7°49′54″E
- Country: Germany
- State: Rhineland-Palatinate
- District: Rhein-Lahn-Kreis
- Municipal assoc.: Nastätten

Government
  - Mayor (2019–24): André Stötzer

Area
  - Total: 15.01 km^{2} (5.80 sq mi)
- Elevation: 217 m (712 ft)

Population (2025-12-31)
  - Total: 2,019
  - Density: 134.5/km^{2} (348.4/sq mi)
- Time zone: UTC+01:00 (CET)
  - Summer (DST): UTC+02:00 (CEST)
- Postal codes: 56357
- Dialling codes: 06772
- Vehicle registration: EMS, DIZ, GOH

Miehlen (German pronunciation: [ˈmiːlən]) is a municipality in the district of Rhein-Lahn, in Rhineland-Palatinate, in western Germany.

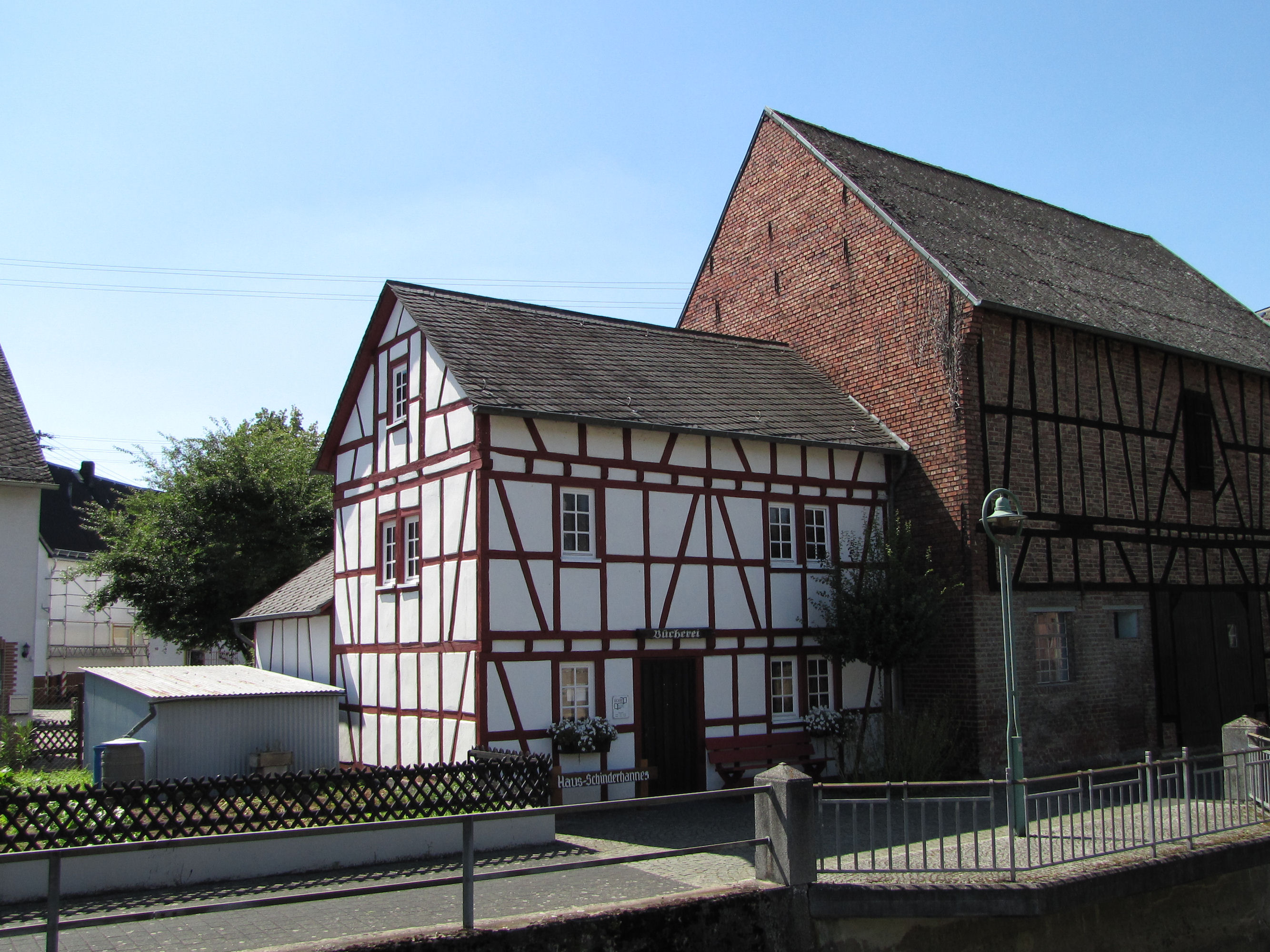
House of Schinderhannes in Miehlen
