= Oberwallmenach =

- Municipality
- Coat of arms

- Location of Oberwallmenach within Rhein-Lahn-Kreis district
- Interactive map of Oberwallmenach
- Location within Germany Location within Rhineland-Palatinate
- Coordinates: 50°9′51″N 7°49′42″E
- Country: Germany
- State: Rhineland-Palatinate
- District: Rhein-Lahn-Kreis
- Municipal assoc.: Nastätten

Government
  - Mayor (2019–24): Anja Haibach

Area
  - Total: 3.18 km^{2} (1.23 sq mi)
- Elevation: 380 m (1,250 ft)

Population (2025-12-31)
  - Total: 201
  - Density: 63.2/km^{2} (164/sq mi)
- Time zone: UTC+01:00 (CET)
  - Summer (DST): UTC+02:00 (CEST)
- Postal codes: 56357
- Dialling codes: 06772
- Vehicle registration: EMS, DIZ, GOH

Oberwallmenach is a municipality in the district of Rhein-Lahn, in Rhineland-Palatinate, in western Germany.
