= Nastätten =

- Town
- Coat of arms

- Location of Nastätten within Rhein-Lahn-Kreis district
- Interactive map of Nastätten
- Location within Germany Location within Rhineland-Palatinate
- Coordinates: 50°11′58″N 7°51′30″E
- Country: Germany
- State: Rhineland-Palatinate
- District: Rhein-Lahn-Kreis
- Municipal assoc.: Nastätten

Government
  - Mayor (2019–24): Marco Ludwig (SPD)

Area
  - Total: 13.05 km^{2} (5.04 sq mi)
- Elevation: 280 m (920 ft)

Population (2025-12-31)
  - Total: 4,526
  - Density: 346.8/km^{2} (898.3/sq mi)
- Time zone: UTC+01:00 (CET)
  - Summer (DST): UTC+02:00 (CEST)
- Postal codes: 56355
- Dialling codes: 06772
- Vehicle registration: EMS, DIZ, GOH
- Website: www.nastaetten.de

Nastätten (German pronunciation: [ˈnaʃtɛtn̩]) is a municipality in the Rhein-Lahn-Kreis, in Rhineland-Palatinate, Germany. It is situated in the Taunus, approx. 25 km southeast of Koblenz, and 35 km northwest of Wiesbaden.

Nastätten is the seat of the Verbandsgemeinde ("collective municipality") Nastätten.

== Sons and daughters of the city ==
- Robert F. Wagner (1877-1953), US senator and founder of American social legislation, his homonymous son Robert F. Wagner Jr. was Mayor of New York from 1954 to 1965
- Harro Heuser (1927-2011), mathematician and author
