= Otto A.G.O. 70 hp =

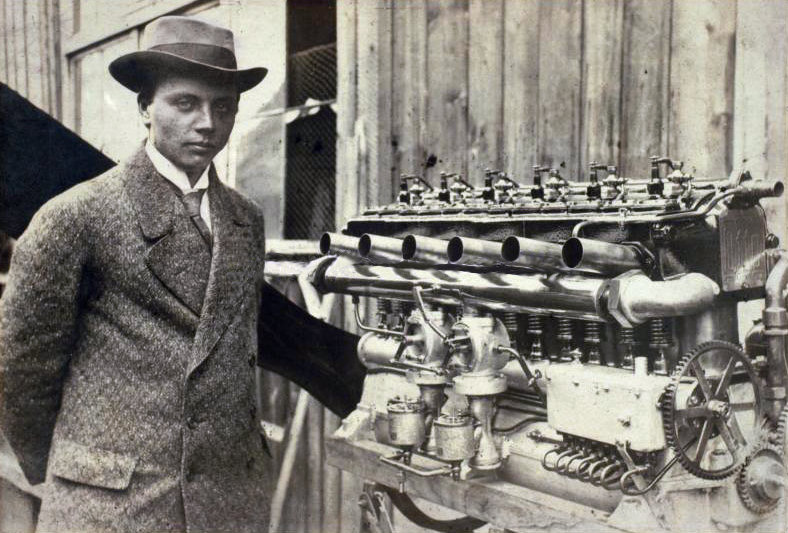
- Gustav Otto with an Otto A.G.O. 70 hp aircraft engine
- Type: Piston inline aero engine
- National origin: Germany
- Manufacturer: Gustav Otto Flugmaschinenwerke
- First run: c. 1912
- Developed from: Otto A.G.O. 50 hp

The Otto A.G.O. 70 hp aircraft engine was a six-cylinder, water cooled inline engine built by the German Gustav Otto Flugmaschinenwerke.

== Design and development ==
The Otto A.G.O. (Aeromotor Gustav Otto) 70 hp engine was developed from the preceding four-cylinder 50 hp type by Hans Geisenhof at the Gustav Otto Flugmaschinenwerke. It kept the same general design and also had the same bore and stroke of 110 mm × 150 mm (4.33 in × 5.91 in), producing about 70 hp (52 kW) at 1,200 rpm.

The cylinders were cast separately from iron and then machined. They were grouped together to a single block, joined at their cooling jackets by means of flanges and bolts. There were two side valves per cylinder, which were operated from the camshaft, which was located on the left side of the engine block and driven from the crankshaft by spur gears. The conjoined cylinder block incorporated a single intake duct running through the water jackets. Two Cudell-G.A.-carburettors were placed together mid-engine and fed into this intake duct from both ends via a common intake pipe. The intake pipe and the carburettors were enclosed by heating jackets, which were integrated into the coolant circulation. There was a single spark plug per cylinder, with the magneto located at the control side of the engine, driven from the crankshaft via an intermediate spur gear.

The crankshaft was supported by two intermediate and two outer plain bearings, with two additional thrust ball bearings at the propeller end. Lubrication was pressure fed, with an oil pump feeding oil to the crankshaft bearings.

== Specifications ==
Data from Quittner

=== General characteristics ===
- Type: six-cylinder, water-cooled in-line piston engine
- Bore: 110 mm (4.33 in)
- Stroke: 150 mm (5.91 in)
- Displacement: 8.55 L (522 cu in)
- Dry weight: 130 kg (287 lb)
- Designer: Hans Geisenhof

=== Components ===
- Valvetrain: one camshaft in the engine block, two Sidevalves per cylinder actuated via roller tappets
- Cooling system: Water-cooled
- Reduction gear: Direct-drive

=== Performance ===
- Power output: 70 hp (52 kW) at 1,200 rpm

== See also ==
- Otto A.G.O. 50 hp

Related lists

- List of aircraft engines
