= Hainau, Germany =

Hainau
- Municipality
- Coat of arms

- Location of Hainau within Rhein-Lahn-Kreis district
- Interactive map of Hainau
- Location within Germany Location within Rhineland-Palatinate
- Coordinates: 50°13′21″N 7°46′55″E
- Country: Germany
- State: Rhineland-Palatinate
- District: Rhein-Lahn-Kreis
- Municipal assoc.: Nastätten

Government
  - Mayor (2019–24): Carsten Schmidt

Area
  - Total: 3.31 km^{2} (1.28 sq mi)
- Elevation: 280 m (920 ft)

Population (2025-12-31)
  - Total: 168
  - Density: 50.8/km^{2} (131/sq mi)
- Time zone: UTC+01:00 (CET)
  - Summer (DST): UTC+02:00 (CEST)
- Postal codes: 56357
- Dialling codes: 06772
- Vehicle registration: EMS, DIZ, GOH
- Website: www.hainau.de

Hainau (German pronunciation: [ˈhaɪnaʊ]) is a municipality in the district of Rhein-Lahn, in Rhineland-Palatinate, in western Germany.
