= Hunzel =

- Municipality
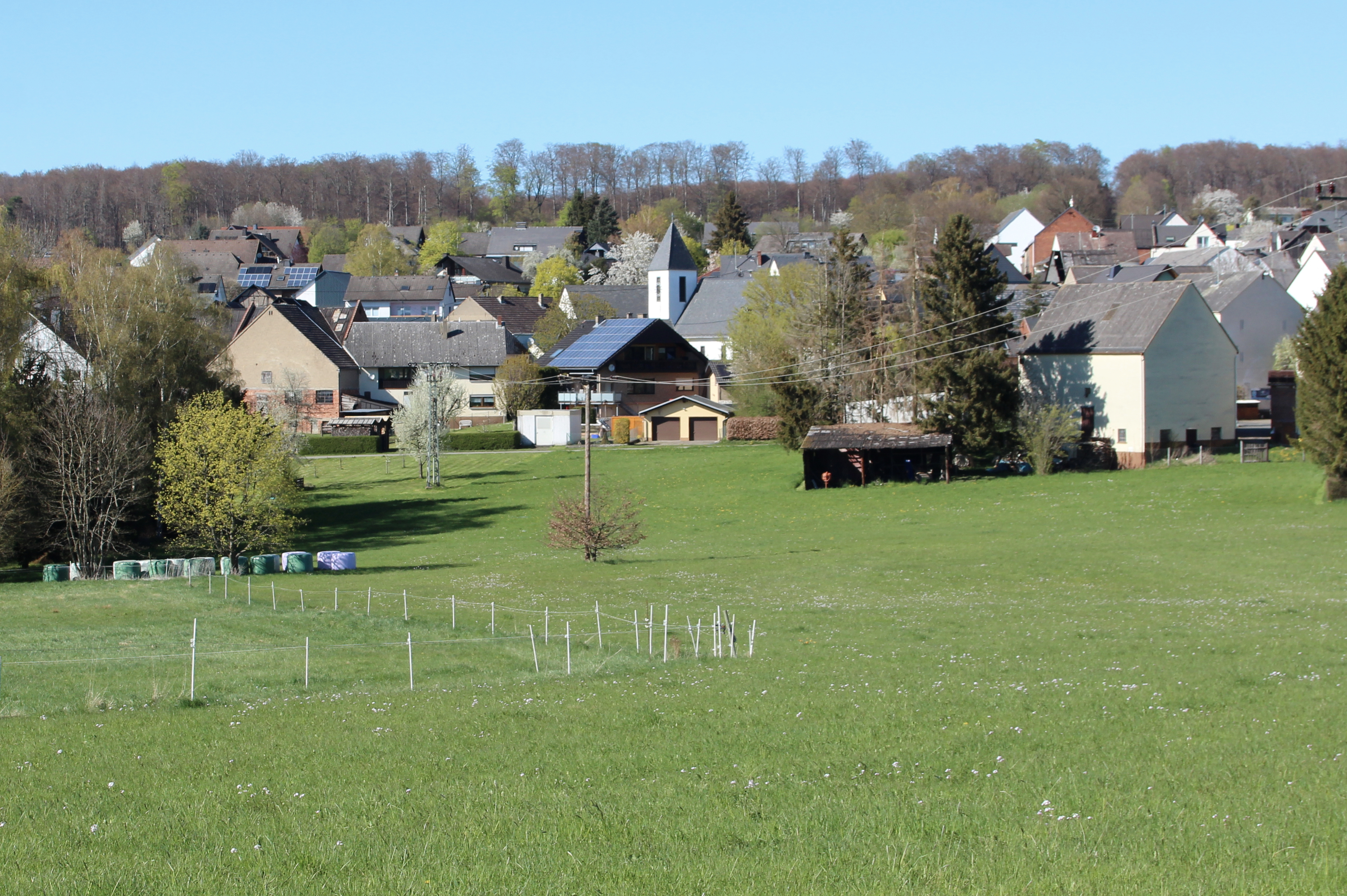

- Coat of arms

- Location of Hunzel within Rhein-Lahn-Kreis district
- Interactive map of Hunzel
- Location within Germany Location within Rhineland-Palatinate
- Coordinates: 50°14′55.6″N 7°50′17.5″E
- Country: Germany
- State: Rhineland-Palatinate
- District: Rhein-Lahn-Kreis
- Municipal assoc.: Nastätten

Government
  - Mayor (2019–24): Thilo Dehe

Area
  - Total: 4.02 km^{2} (1.55 sq mi)
- Elevation: 300 m (980 ft)

Population (2025-12-31)
  - Total: 246
  - Density: 61.2/km^{2} (158/sq mi)
- Time zone: UTC+01:00 (CET)
  - Summer (DST): UTC+02:00 (CEST)
- Postal codes: 56355
- Dialling codes: 06772
- Vehicle registration: EMS, DIZ, GOH

Hunzel (German pronunciation: [ˈhʊntsl̩]) is a municipality in the district of Rhein-Lahn, in Rhineland-Palatinate, in western Germany.
