= Holzhausen an der Haide =

- Municipality
- Coat of arms

- Location of Holzhausen an der Haide within Rhein-Lahn-Kreis district
- Interactive map of Holzhausen an der Haide
- Location within Germany Location within Rhineland-Palatinate
- Coordinates: 50°13′15″N 7°54′40″E
- Country: Germany
- State: Rhineland-Palatinate
- District: Rhein-Lahn-Kreis
- Municipal assoc.: Nastätten

Government
  - Mayor (2019–24): Hardy Eilenz

Area
  - Total: 8.47 km^{2} (3.27 sq mi)
- Elevation: 400 m (1,300 ft)

Population (2025-12-31)
  - Total: 1,204
  - Density: 142/km^{2} (368/sq mi)
- Time zone: UTC+01:00 (CET)
  - Summer (DST): UTC+02:00 (CEST)
- Postal codes: 56357
- Dialling codes: 06772
- Vehicle registration: EMS, DIZ, GOH
- Website: www.gemeinde-holzhausen.de

Holzhausen an der Haide is a municipality in the district of Rhein-Lahn, in Rhineland-Palatinate, in western Germany.

Holzhausen is the birthplace of Nicolaus August Otto, the inventor of the "Otto Engine".
