= Bettendorf, Germany =

Bettendorf
- Municipality
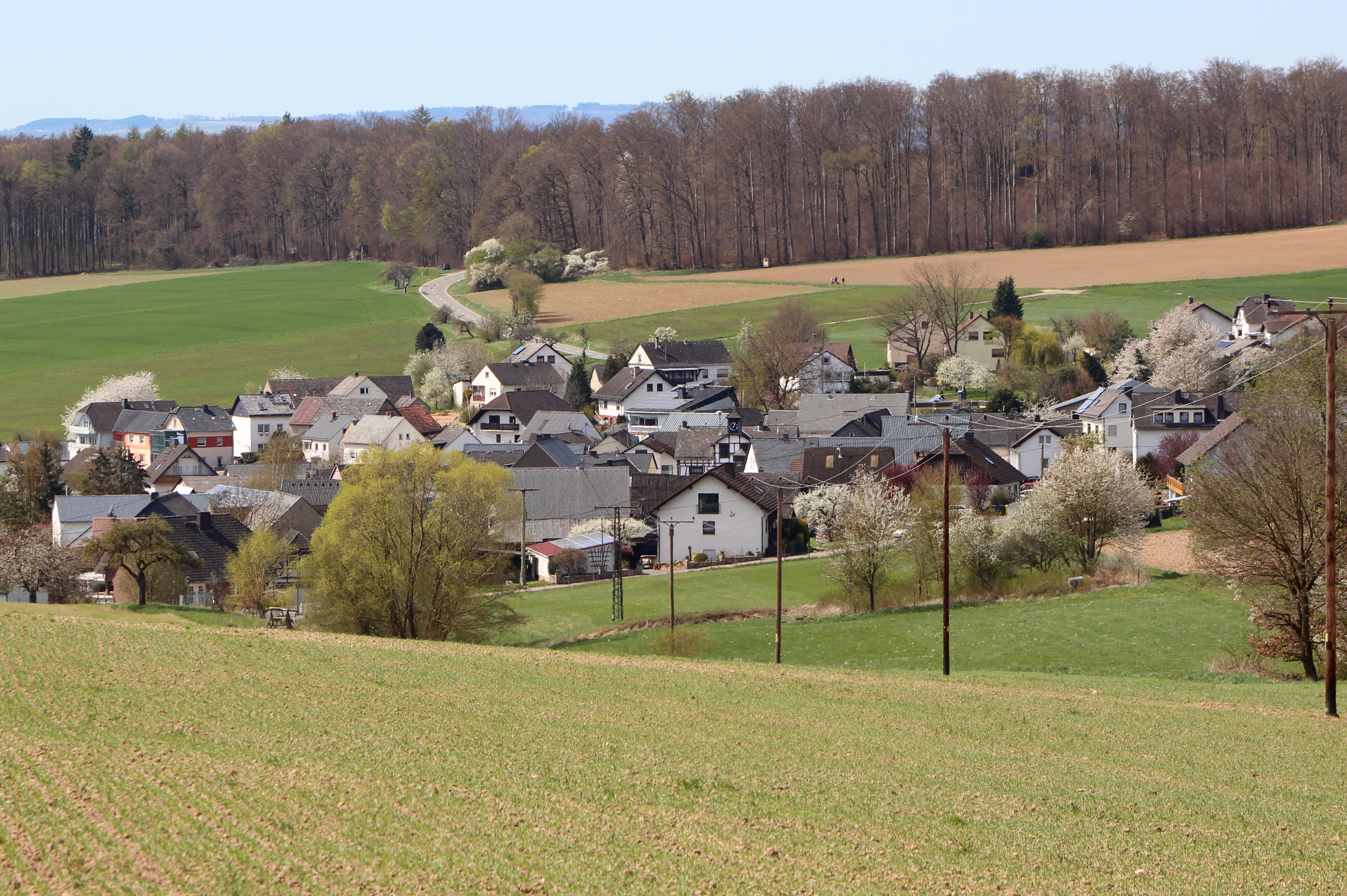

- Coat of arms

- Location of Bettendorf within Rhein-Lahn-Kreis district
- Interactive map of Bettendorf
- Location within Germany Location within Rhineland-Palatinate
- Coordinates: 50°14′0.10″N 7°52′14.98″E
- Country: Germany
- State: Rhineland-Palatinate
- District: Rhein-Lahn-Kreis
- Municipal assoc.: Nastätten

Government
  - Mayor (2019–24): Manfred Fritz Poguntke

Area
  - Total: 3.24 km^{2} (1.25 sq mi)
- Elevation: 310 m (1,020 ft)

Population (2025-12-31)
  - Total: 321
  - Density: 99.1/km^{2} (257/sq mi)
- Time zone: UTC+01:00 (CET)
  - Summer (DST): UTC+02:00 (CEST)
- Postal codes: 56355
- Dialling codes: 06772
- Vehicle registration: EMS, DIZ, GOH
- Website: www.bettendorf-rlp.de

Bettendorf (German pronunciation: [ˈbɛtn̩dɔʁf]) is a municipality in the district of Rhein-Lahn, in Rhineland-Palatinate, in western Germany.
