= Ruppertshofen, Rhineland-Palatinate =

Ruppertshofen
- Municipality
- Coat of arms

- Location of Ruppertshofen within Rhein-Lahn-Kreis district
- Interactive map of Ruppertshofen
- Location within Germany Location within Rhineland-Palatinate
- Coordinates: 50°12′10″N 7°48′28″E
- Country: Germany
- State: Rhineland-Palatinate
- District: Rhein-Lahn-Kreis
- Municipal assoc.: Nastätten

Government
  - Mayor (2019–24): Heike Ullrich

Area
  - Total: 4.78 km^{2} (1.85 sq mi)
- Elevation: 310 m (1,020 ft)

Population (2025-12-31)
  - Total: 348
  - Density: 72.8/km^{2} (189/sq mi)
- Time zone: UTC+01:00 (CET)
  - Summer (DST): UTC+02:00 (CEST)
- Postal codes: 56357
- Dialling codes: 06772
- Vehicle registration: EMS, DIZ, GOH

Ruppertshofen (German pronunciation: [ʁʊpɐtsˈhoːfn̩]) is a municipality in the district of Rhein-Lahn, in Rhineland-Palatinate, in western Germany.
