= Gustav Otto =

German aircraft manufacturer

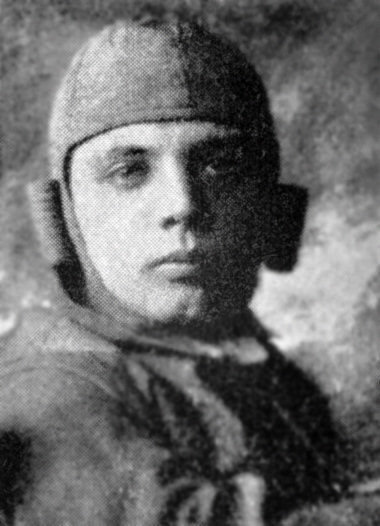
- Portrait of Otto in 1910
- Born: 12 January 1883; Cologne, Germany
- Died: 28 February 1926 (aged 43); Munich, Germany
- Education: Technical College in Hanover, Karlsruhe and Munich
- Occupations: Mechanical Engineer; Entrepreneur
- Known for: Founder of BMW AG
- Title: Founder; General Director
- Parent: Nicolaus August Otto

Gustav Otto (12 January 1883 – 28 February 1926) was a German aircraft and aircraft engine designer and manufacturer.

Otto was born in Cologne to Nicolaus August Otto, the founder of N. A. Otto & Cie. and inventor of the four-stroke internal combustion engine. It is therefore regarded that his interest in engines, specifically aircraft and the manufacture thereof, was something he inherited from his father at an early age.

== Early life ==
Gustav Otto was regarded as successful and career-minded, and moved in elevated social circles. He attended higher secondary school in Cologne, and had internships at machine tool manufacturers. Later, he attended the Technical Colleges in Hanover, Karlsruhe and Munich for further engineering study. He is believed to have remained in Munich after completing his studies to co-found the Bayerische Auto-Garage company. Otto had a difficult time getting out from under his father's long shadow. He was prone to bouts of depression, which affected his work.

== Passion for Flight ==
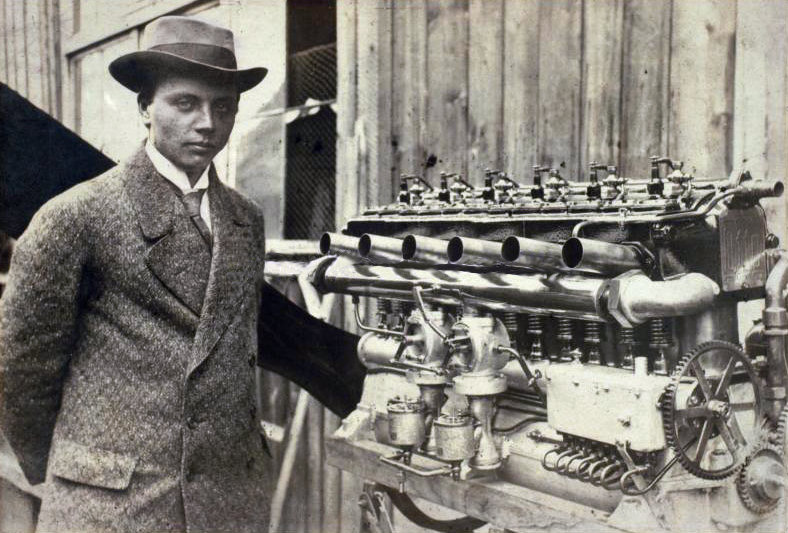
Gustav Otto with an Otto A.G.O. 70 hp aeroengine

Otto successfully raced cars and motorcycles in various competitive events. He was also very active in the earliest days of aviation. On 10 April 1910 he obtained his pilot's licence on an Aviatik biplane (also he took over an agency for this aircraft). He founded the Aeroplanbau Otto-Alberti workshop (renamed Gustav Otto Flugmaschinenfabrik in 1911) at the Puchheim airfield. In 1910, Otto designed and built a biplane which created a sensation throughout Germany. Otto, along with a few others, flew machines made of wood, wire, canvas and powered by Daimler aeroengines. Through their passion for flying machines, they helped transform aviation from a do-it-yourself hobby to an industry vital to the military, especially after the breakout of World War I.

Otto founded several companies for the purpose of building aircraft. For his first company, the following entry was recorded in the Munich Company Register under the number 14/364 on 15 March 1911: "Gustav Otto in Munich, Flugmaschinenfabrik (aircraft factory), Office Karlstrasse 72". Shortly afterwards, Otto moved the workshop from its original location at 37, Gabelsberger Strasse to its new premises at 135, Schleissheimer Strasse, and in 1913 started to construct a new factory at 76, Neulerchenfeldstrasse (later Lerchenauer Straße) at the Oberwiesenfeld (the business was renamed "Otto-Werke" in 1915).

Otto sold over 30 aircraft through his company, which also included a flight school. Ernst Udet, the second-highest scoring German flying ace of World War I (after Manfred von Richthofen), earned his pilot's license after private training with Otto.

== The foundation of BMW ==
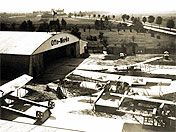
Otto Flugzeugwerke 1914

In 1913, after selling 47 aircraft to the Bavarian Army, Otto opened a factory Otto-Flugzeugwerke on Lerchenauer Strasse just east of the Oberwiesenfeld troop manoeuvre area in the Milbertshofen district of Munich (this area later became Munich's first airport). He wanted to be closer to the German government's procurement process for military sale. However, he was not skilled at the politics and payoffs necessary when dealing with the Bavarian war ministry and Prussian Army. Unable to navigate these politics while leaving his pride and integrity intact deeply troubled him.

Biplane from Otto Flugzeugwerke

Shortly after 1914, Otto established another company named AGO Flugzeugwerke at Berlin's Johannisthal Air Field. The name "AGO" stood for either Actien-Gesellschaft Otto or Aerowerke Gustav Otto – there seems to be some ambiguity – but during the early years of World War I the company mostly licence-built Otto Flugmaschinenfabrik designs (as did Pfalz Flugzeugwerke). Otto's designs were initially successful, but constantly plagued with problems related to cost-effective production, and revenue. At the start of the war, Otto-Flugzeugwerke was supplying the German Air Force, but the production problems ended up being so great that government agencies urged the company to solve the issues. The stress of wartime seemed to prove too great a burden for Otto who suffered health issues which led to financial problems with the company: In 1915 he was admitted to a Munich mental hospital for treatment of depression. During his treatment, the company languished to the brink of bankruptcy. Eventually, Otto was forced to resign and was offered a buyout that would compensate him for the business and also cover his medical bills. The assets were finally taken over by a consortium which incorporated them into Bayerische Flugzeugwerke on 19 February 1916. Otto therefore no longer had a stake in this company and instead turned his interest to a just previously founded (1 February 1916) independent Otto-Werke Flugzeug- und Maschinenfabrik GmbH.

Franz Joseph Popp, an Austrian military engineer/supervisor who had been sent to the unreliable Rapp Motor Works in Munich to oversee the production of 224 Type IIIa aero engines to the Austro-Daimler design badly needed for the war effort, had re-registered Rapp Motor Works as Bayerische Motoren Werke (BMW) on July 21 1917, in order to gain acceptance for a wholly new and greatly superior aero engine designed by Max Friz. After World War One ended and BMW were banned from anything military, they became a contract machining business. The major shareholder in BMW, Vienna based Italian speculator Camillo Castiglionli, sold all of his shares to BMW’s main customer, Knorr Bremse, in May 1920, who then acquired the remaining shares to make BMW a wholly owned subsidiary still run by Popp.

Less than two years later Popp persuaded Castiglionli buy back the BMW company name and buy the Bayerische Flugzeugwerke for its production site on the other side of the air field. BMW then produced the legendary Max Friz designed R32 shaft drive motorcycle, featuring an integrated gearbox, recirculating rather than total loss lubrication and with the cylinder heads poking out for cooling.

After the First World War, Otto started a new attempt at car manufacturing with the Starnberger Automobilwerke. The luxury Otto-Mercedes car built there is alleged to have been well received abroad.

In 1924 Otto was divorced from his wife Ada. He suffered badly from the emotional ordeal. Ada remarried, but in August 1925 died under mysterious circumstances that gave rise to much speculation. Although no longer married to her, Otto took her death most harshly and apparently fell into a deep depression.

In 1926, amid failed attempts at business (caused by various reasons), the death of his wife, and health issues, Otto died by suicide at the age of 43 in Munich.

== See also ==
- History of BMW
