= Scheidt =

Scheidt may refer to the following:

== People with the surname ==
- Edward Scheidt (born 1939), American cryptographer and ex-Chairman of the CIA Cryptographic Center
- Gottfried Scheidt (1593–1661), German Baroque composer and brother of Samuel Scheidt
- Hans-Wilhelm Scheidt (1907-1981), German Nazi official
- Mathias Scheidt, Archbishop of Vienna (1490–1493)
- Mike Scheidt, American metal vocalist
- Rafael Scheidt (born 1976), Brazilian footballer
- Robert Scheidt (born 1973), Brazilian sailor
- Samuel Scheidt (1587–1654), German Baroque composer and brother of Gottfried Scheidt
- Rorich von Scheidt (1518–1585), German nobleman as the Lord of Scheidt, Bröl, Lohmar, Fussberg, Buisdorf, Etzenbach, Hönscheid, Hülscheid, and Schöneberg
- Wilhelm Heinrich von Scheidt (1535–1611), Lord of Rötzingshofen from 1596–1611, Imperial Count Palatine of Solingen, Burg, and Beyenburg
- Johann Bertram von Scheidt, 1st Baron von Scheidt (1580–1662), Lord of Scheid, Schönenberg, Herrenbröl, Troisdorf, Heltorf, and Bilkerath, emissary of Emperor Ferdinand III during the Thirty Years’ War, also foster father of Phillip Wilhelm, Duke of Julich and Berg
- Lords von Scheidt genannt Weschpfennig, a German noble family

== Places ==
- Scheidt (Saarbrücken), a borough (Stadtteil) of the city of Saarbrücken, in western Germany
- Scheidt, Rhineland-Palatinate, a municipality in western Germany
