= Scheidemann =

Origin
- Language: German
- Meaning: referee, judge
- Region of origin: Germany

Other names
- Variant forms: Scheid, Scheidt, Scheidel, Scheider, Scheidler, Goldscheider

Scheidemann is a surname of German origin. Notable people with the surname include:

- Heinrich Scheidemann (c. 1595–1663), German organist and composer
- Henry Scheidemann (1877–1964), New York assemblyman
- Philipp Scheidemann (1865–1939), German Social Democratic politician
