= Johann Bertram von Scheid =

Johann Bertram Baron von Scheidt genannt Weschpfennig zu Heltorf (b. November 16, 1580 Heltorf Castle; † June 4, 1662 Düsseldorf) was a German baron who was also Lord of Scheid, Schönenberg, Herrenbröl, Troisdorf, Heltorf, and Bilkerath. He was bailiff, director of the Bergisch Landtag and Obersthofmeister (Grand Master of the Court).

Johann Bertram was involved in the Thirty Years’ War (1618–1648), serving under the Palatine Count Wolfgang Wilhelm. His mission involved political negotiations and communication between leaders, most notably, the Swedish general Buadissin.

In 1642, he became the first member of the von Scheidt’s to hold the rank of baron, and was elevated to the position for his service to Emperor Ferdinand III.

== Life ==
Johann Bertram von Scheid was the son of Imperial Count Palatine Wilhelm von Scheid genannt Weschpfennig, which made him the grandson of Rorich von Scheidt. He inherited the noble estates of Scheid, Bröl (Herrenbröl), Troisdorf, Heltorf, Saurenbach and Rötzinghofen.

He studied in Tübingen and then undertook a pilgrimage to Jerusalem.

On July 31, 1610, he succeeded his uncle as bailiff of Angermund and also became bailiff of Landsberg. After becoming chamberlain and judge in Angermund, on May 8, 1611 he became game forester in the Angermund office and wood count in the Huckinger Mark. On November 13, 1620, he became a Privy Councillor to the Prince of Julich-Berg. On August 1, 1621, he was appointed Bergisch Land Marshal. In 1625 he was appointed director of the Landtag by Count Palatine Wolfgang Wilhelm. He later even appointed him Obristhofmeister. On January 27, 1642, Johann Bertram was elevated to the hereditary baronage by Emperor Ferdinand III. However, as he only had two daughters, this status later lapsed. Nevertheless, corresponding entries were later made in civil status registers.

== Marriage and issue ==
Johann Bertram had been married to Margaretha von Tengnagel, from the family Drost zu Ravenstein, since October 25, 1615. From their marriage was one daughter.

- Maria von Scheidt genannt Weschpfennig, Lady of Heltorf (1620-1677)

By 1645, von Tengnagel died, and by 1650, Johann had another daughter with Elise Katharina von Rebroich:

- Maria Katharina von Scheidt genannt Weschpfennig (1655-1699)

Johann was also the foster father of Phillip Wilhelm, Duke of Julich and Berg.
