= Dreisbach =

Dreisbach may refer to:

== Places ==
- Dreisbach, Westerwaldkreis

== Rivers ==
- Dreisbach (Bröl), river of North Rhine-Westphalia, Germany, tributary of the Bröl
- Dreisbach (Sieg), river of North Rhine-Westphalia, Germany, tributary of the Sieg

== Surname ==
- Dreisbach (surname)

== See also ==
- Treisbach (disambiguation)
