= Bornscheider Bach =

Location
- Country: Germany
- State: North Rhine-Westphalia

Physical characteristics
- Mouth
  - location: Waldbrölbach
  - coordinates: 50.8369°N 7.4361°E
- Length: 3.6 km (2.2 mi)

Basin features
- Progression: Waldbrölbach→ Bröl→ Sieg→ Rhine→ North Sea

Bornscheider Bach is a river of North Rhine-Westphalia, Germany. It flows into the Waldbrölbach near Ruppichteroth.

== See also ==
- List of rivers of North Rhine-Westphalia
