= Scheid (disambiguation) =

Scheid is a village in the municipality of Tomils, Hinterrhein, Switzerland.

Scheid may also refer to:

- Scheid (surname)
- Scheid, Rhineland-Palatinate, German municipality in the district of Vulkaneifel

== See also ==
- Scheidt, Rhineland-Palatinate
