= Werschbach =

River in Germany

Location
- Country: Germany
- State: North Rhine-Westphalia

Physical characteristics
- Mouth
  - location: Bröl
  - coordinates: 50.8572°N 7.4418°E

Basin features
- Progression: Bröl→ Sieg→ Rhine→ North Sea

Werschbach is a small river of North Rhine-Westphalia, Germany. It flows into the Bröl near Ruppichteroth.

== See also ==
- List of rivers of North Rhine-Westphalia
