= Aull, Germany =

Aull
- Municipality
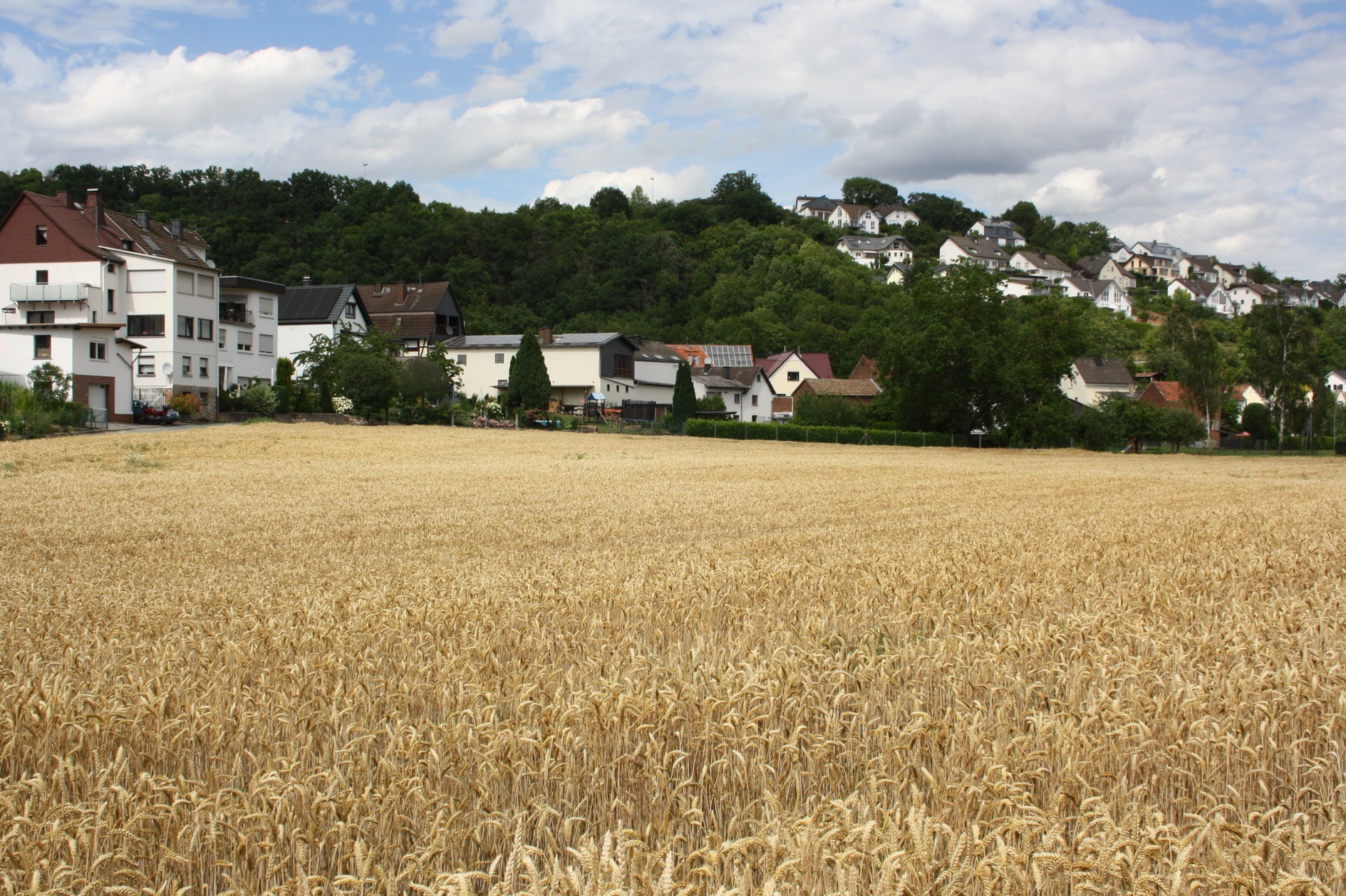

- Coat of arms

- Location of Aull within Rhein-Lahn-Kreis district
- Interactive map of Aull
- Location within Germany Location within Rhineland-Palatinate
- Coordinates: 50°23′13″N 8°0′26″E
- Country: Germany
- State: Rhineland-Palatinate
- District: Rhein-Lahn-Kreis
- Municipal assoc.: Diez

Government
  - Mayor (2019–24): Michael Weimar

Area
  - Total: 2.17 km^{2} (0.84 sq mi)
- Elevation: 115 m (377 ft)

Population (2025-12-31)
  - Total: 398
  - Density: 183/km^{2} (475/sq mi)
- Time zone: UTC+01:00 (CET)
  - Summer (DST): UTC+02:00 (CEST)
- Postal codes: 65582
- Dialling codes: 06432
- Vehicle registration: EMS, DIZ, GOH

Aull (German pronunciation: [aʊl]) is a municipality in the district of Rhein-Lahn, in Rhineland-Palatinate, in western Germany. It belongs to the association community of Diez.

== Geography ==
Aull is located in the east of Rhineland-Palatinate between the Taunus and Westerwald on the Lahn, at the western end of the Limburg Basin. It is bordered on the south by the city of Diez, in the north by the community of Gückingen (both in Rheinland-Pfalz) and in the east by the Limburg district (in Hessen).

== Transport ==
Aull is connected to the public local bus lines 450 and 575. Nearest train station is Diez station.
