= Waldbrölbach =

River in Germany

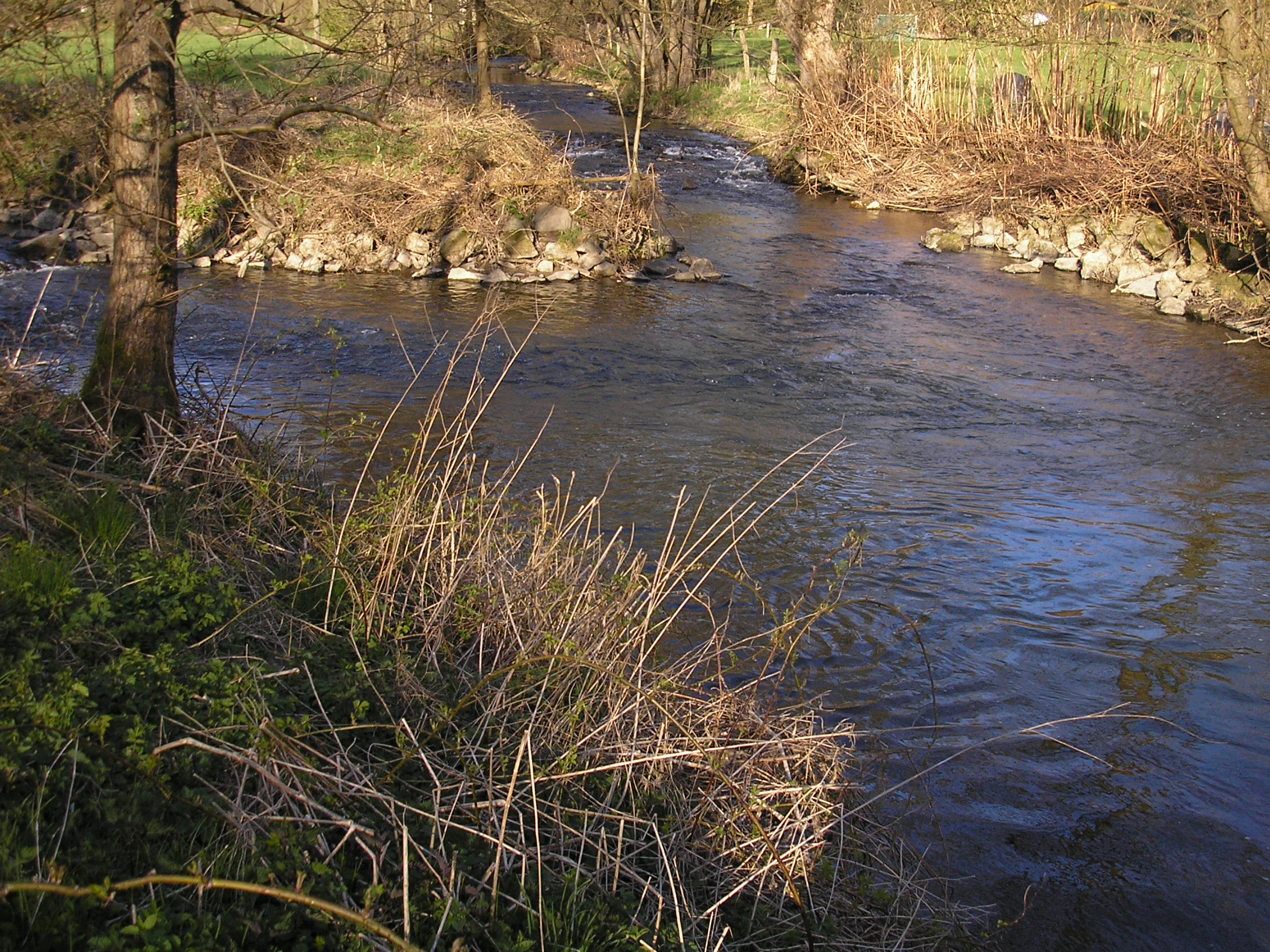

Location
- Country: Germany
- State: North Rhine-Westphalia

Physical characteristics
- Mouth
  - location: Bröl
  - coordinates: 50.8375°N 7.4143°E
- Length: 20.4 km (12.7 mi)

Basin features
- Progression: Bröl→ Sieg→ Rhine→ North Sea
- Tributaries
  - left: Bornscheider Bach
  - right: Höver Bach

Waldbrölbach is a river of North Rhine-Westphalia, Germany. It flows into the Bröl near Ruppichteroth.

== See also ==
- List of rivers of North Rhine-Westphalia
