= Horhausen =

Horhausen is the name of several municipalities in Rhineland-Palatinate:

- Horhausen, Altenkirchen
- Horhausen, Rhein-Lahn
