= Annunciation Hermitage =

Serbian Orthodox monastery in Eiterfeld, Germany

- Испосница Благовести Јустина Ћелијског
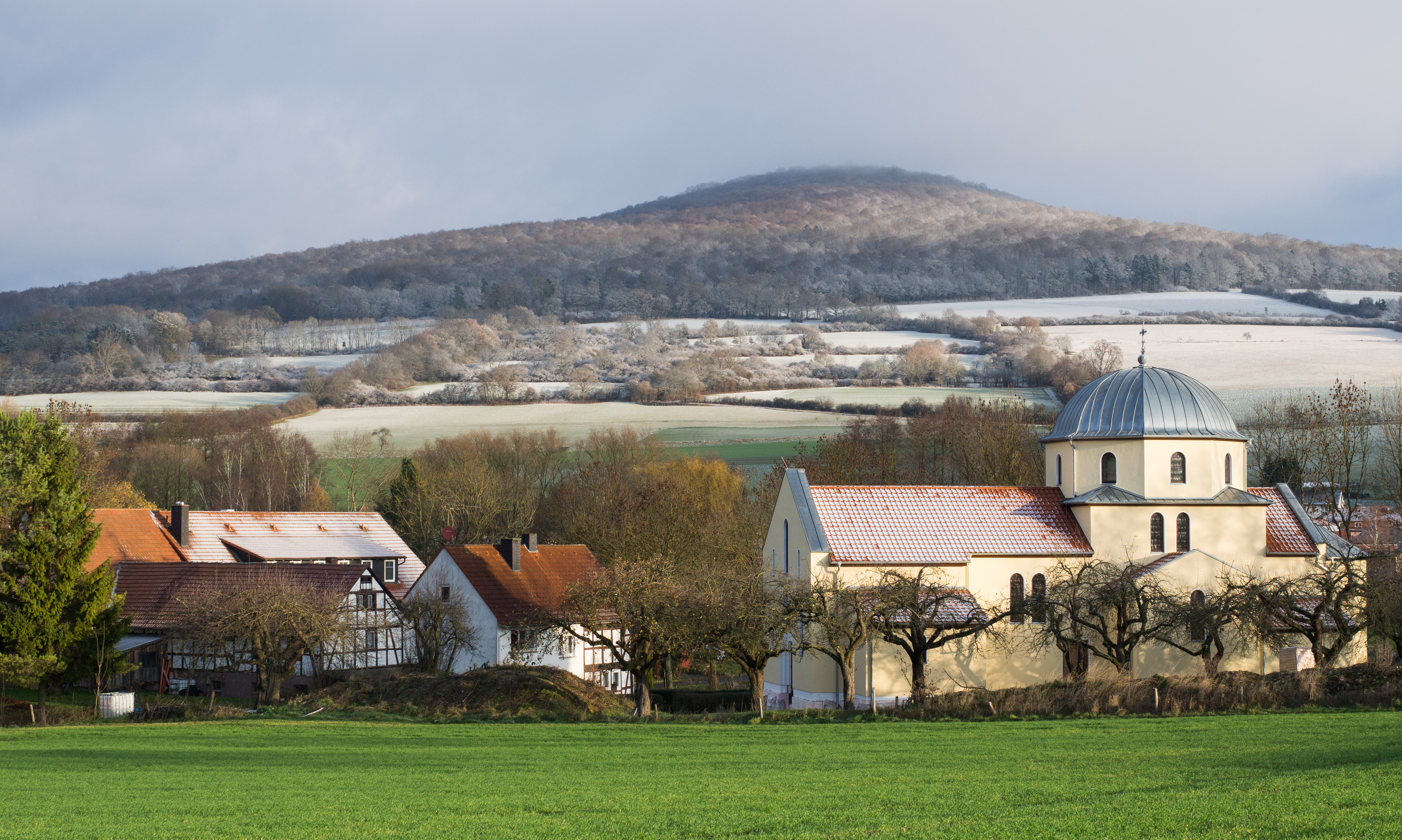

- Location within Germany

Monastery information
- Full name: Hermitage of the Annunciation of the Most Holy Theotokos and Saint Justin of Ćelije
- Other name: Hermitage of the Annunciation
- Order: Serbian Orthodox
- Denomination: Eastern Orthodox
- Established: 2010
- Mother house: Skete of Saint Spyridon, Geilnau
- Dedication: Annunciation and Saint Justin of Ćelije
- Diocese: Serbian Orthodox Eparchy of Düsseldorf and Germany

People
- Founder: Serbian Orthodox Church
- Abbot: Schema-Archimandrite Justin (Rauer)
- Important associated figures: Justin Popović, Patriarch Irinej

Architecture
- Functional status: Active
- Architect: Norman Heimbrodt
- Style: Serbo-Byzantine
- Groundbreaking: 2014

Site
- Location: Unterufhausen, Eiterfeld
- Country: Germany
- Coordinates: 50°46′5.862″N 9°52′28.311″E
- Other information: Monastic community of the Skete of Saint Spyridon, Geilnau
- Website: https://eparhija-nemacka.com/isposnica-blagovesti-presvete-bogorodice-i-prepodobnog-justina-celijskog/

Annunciation Hermitage (Serbian: Испосница Благовести, romanized: Isposnica Blagovesti), also known as the Hermitage of the Annunciation of the Most Holy Theotokos and Saint Justin of Ćelije (Испосница Благовести Пресвете Богородице и Преподобног Јустина Ћелијског, Isposnica Blagovesti Presvete Bogorodice i Prepodobnog Justina Ćelijskog), is a Serbian Orthodox monastery in the Eparchy of Düsseldorf and Germany. It is a monastic community of the Skete of Saint Spyridon in Geilnau. It is currently home to a single monk, Hegumen Schema-Archimandrite Justin (Rauer), hence its designation as a hermitage.

== History ==
The building, formerly a mill estate, was purchased in 2010. Following the renovation of the monastery courtyard and the construction of a new church, plans were made to relocate monks from the Skete of Saint Spyridon in Geilnau to the Annunciation Hermitage in Unterufhausen. The monastery has a double dedication to the Annunciation and Saint Justin Popović, because, according to the Julian calendar, Saint Justin was born on the feast of the Annunciation in 1894 and died on the same feast day in 1979.

== Construction of the monastery church ==
In December 2013, Serbian Patriarch Irinej blessed a plot of land within an orchard next to the monastery courtyard for the construction of a church, which began in 2014. The cross-domed church was built modelled after the 13th-century church of the Gradac Monastery in Serbia. Architect Norman Heimbrodt designed the church. The Eastern Orthodox church was built of solid timber with walls 34 centimetres thick. In the 258-square-metre basement, concrete rooms were built to serve as parlours or refectories. The church stands 16 metres high and is oriented with its altar facing east. A porch and narthex are located on the west side, above which a monk's apartment was constructed. In the summer of 2015, the cross was placed on the dome, and the exterior of the church was plastered. The interior is scheduled to be frescoed.

== See also ==
- Vasilije Grolimund
- Germany–Serbia relations
- Serbs in Germany

== Sources ==
- Puzović, Predrag (1996). "Епархије Српске православне цркве у расејању" [Dioceses of the Serbian Orthodox Church in the Diaspora] (PDF). Богословље: Часопис Православног богословског факултета у Београду. 40 (1–2): 87–96. Archived from the original (PDF) on 8 June 2019.
