= Scheider =

Scheider is a German surname. Notable people with the surname include:

- Christian Scheider (born 1990), American writer, filmmaker and stage artist
- Cynthia Scheider, American film editor
- Roy Scheider (1932–2008), American actor
- Timo Scheider (born 1978), German race car driver

== See also ==
- Scheid (surname)
- Scheidemann
- Schneider (disambiguation)
