= Shite =

The word shite may refer to:

- A variation of shit, especially in the Republic of Ireland and the United Kingdom
- The shite, the principal character in a Japanese Noh play
- Shite, the person who performs the technique in aikido

== See also ==
- Shi'ite
- Scheidt (disambiguation)
