= Isselbach =

- Municipality
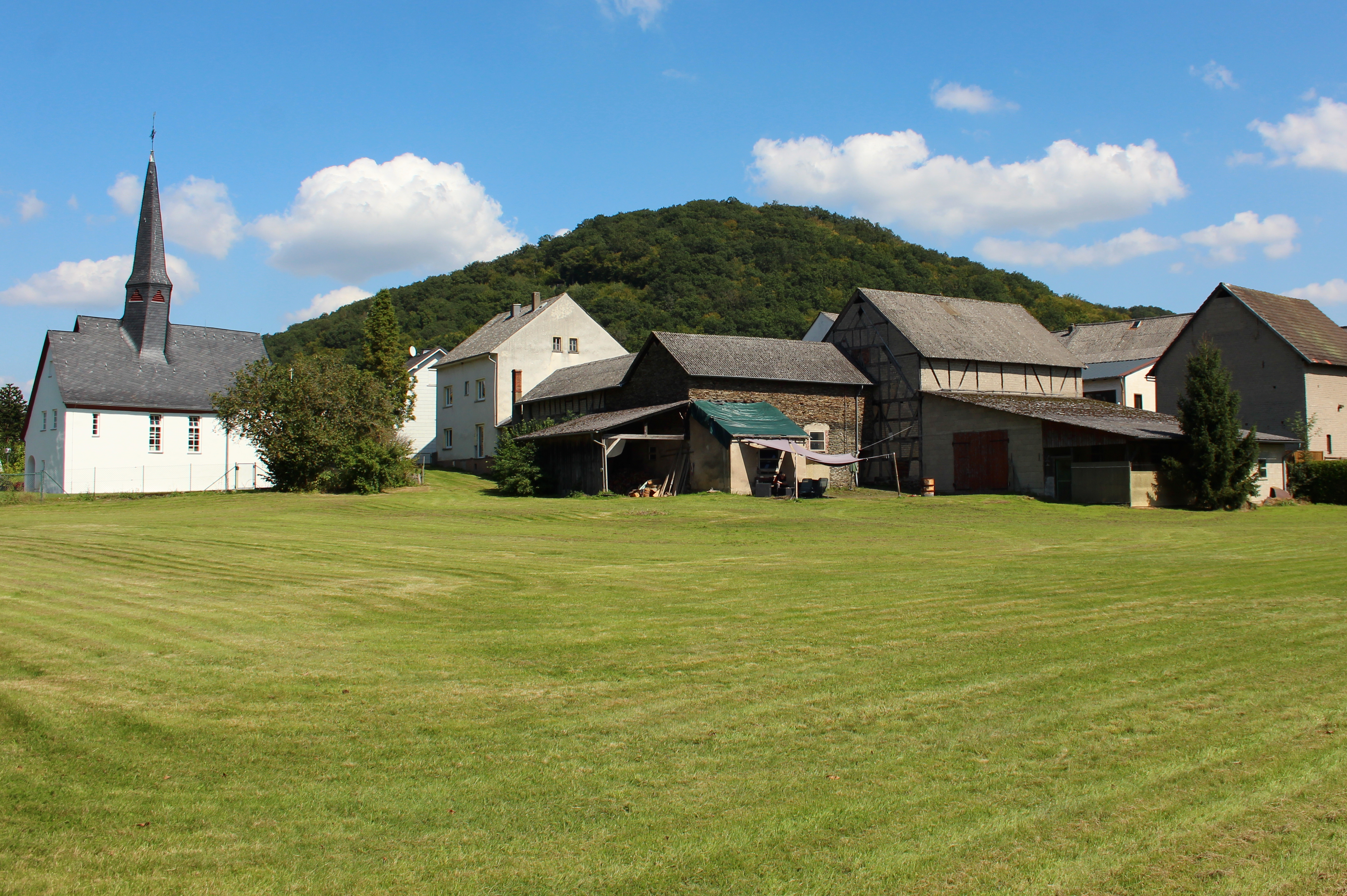

- Coat of arms

- Location of Isselbach within Rhein-Lahn-Kreis district
- Interactive map of Isselbach
- Location within Germany Location within Rhineland-Palatinate
- Coordinates: 50°23′23″N 7°53′30″E
- Country: Germany
- State: Rhineland-Palatinate
- District: Rhein-Lahn-Kreis
- Municipal assoc.: Diez
- Subdivisions: 3

Government
  - Mayor (2019–24): Ulrich Jürgens

Area
  - Total: 7.19 km^{2} (2.78 sq mi)
- Elevation: 165 m (541 ft)

Population (2025-12-31)
  - Total: 392
  - Density: 54.5/km^{2} (141/sq mi)
- Time zone: UTC+01:00 (CET)
  - Summer (DST): UTC+02:00 (CEST)
- Postal codes: 65558
- Dialling codes: 06439
- Vehicle registration: EMS, DIZ, GOH
- Website: www.vgdiez.de

Isselbach is a municipality in the district of Rhein-Lahn, in Rhineland-Palatinate, in western Germany. It belongs to the association community of Diez.

== Transport ==
Isselbach is located in the transport association Verkehrsverbund Rhein-Mosel (VRM), zone number 519 and served by the local bus lines 453, 458, 577 and 578.
