= Dörnberg =

- Municipality
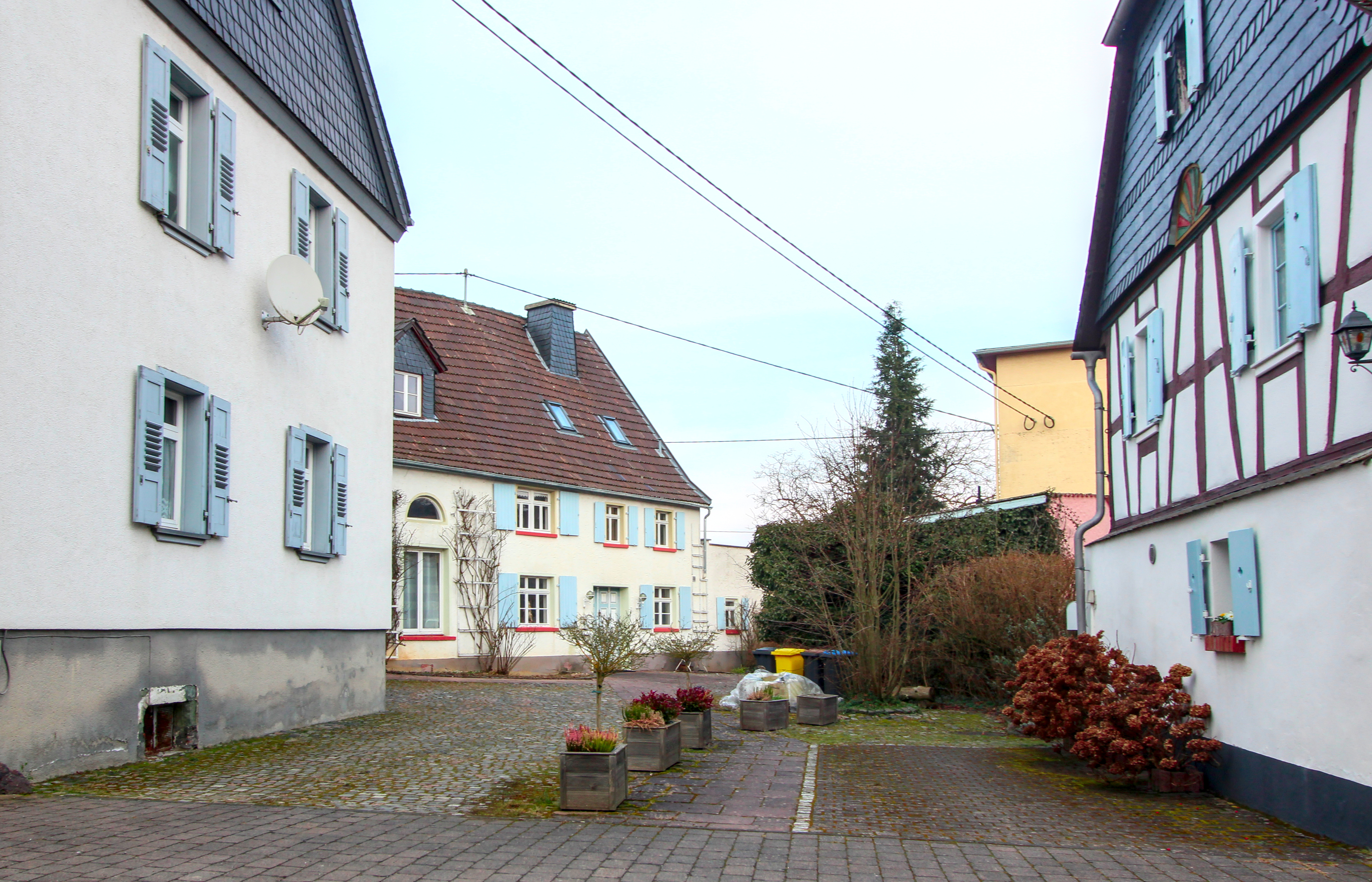

- Flag Coat of arms

- Location of Dörnberg within Rhein-Lahn-Kreis district
- Interactive map of Dörnberg
- Location within Germany Location within Rhineland-Palatinate
- Coordinates: 50°19′32.42″N 7°53′0.61″E
- Country: Germany
- State: Rhineland-Palatinate
- District: Rhein-Lahn-Kreis
- Municipal assoc.: Diez
- Subdivisions: 3

Government
  - Mayor (2019–24): Heiko Hofmann

Area
  - Total: 5.83 km^{2} (2.25 sq mi)
- Elevation: 280 m (920 ft)

Population (2025-12-31)
  - Total: 460
  - Density: 79/km^{2} (200/sq mi)
- Time zone: UTC+01:00 (CET)
  - Summer (DST): UTC+02:00 (CEST)
- Postal codes: 56379 (Dörnberg und Hütte) 56377 (Kalkofen)
- Dialling codes: 06439
- Vehicle registration: EMS, DIZ, GOH
- Website: doernberg-lahn.de

Dörnberg (German pronunciation: [ˈdœʁnbɛʁk]) is a municipality in the district of Rhein-Lahn, in Rhineland-Palatinate, in western Germany. It belongs to the association community of Diez.
