= Steinsberg =

- Municipality
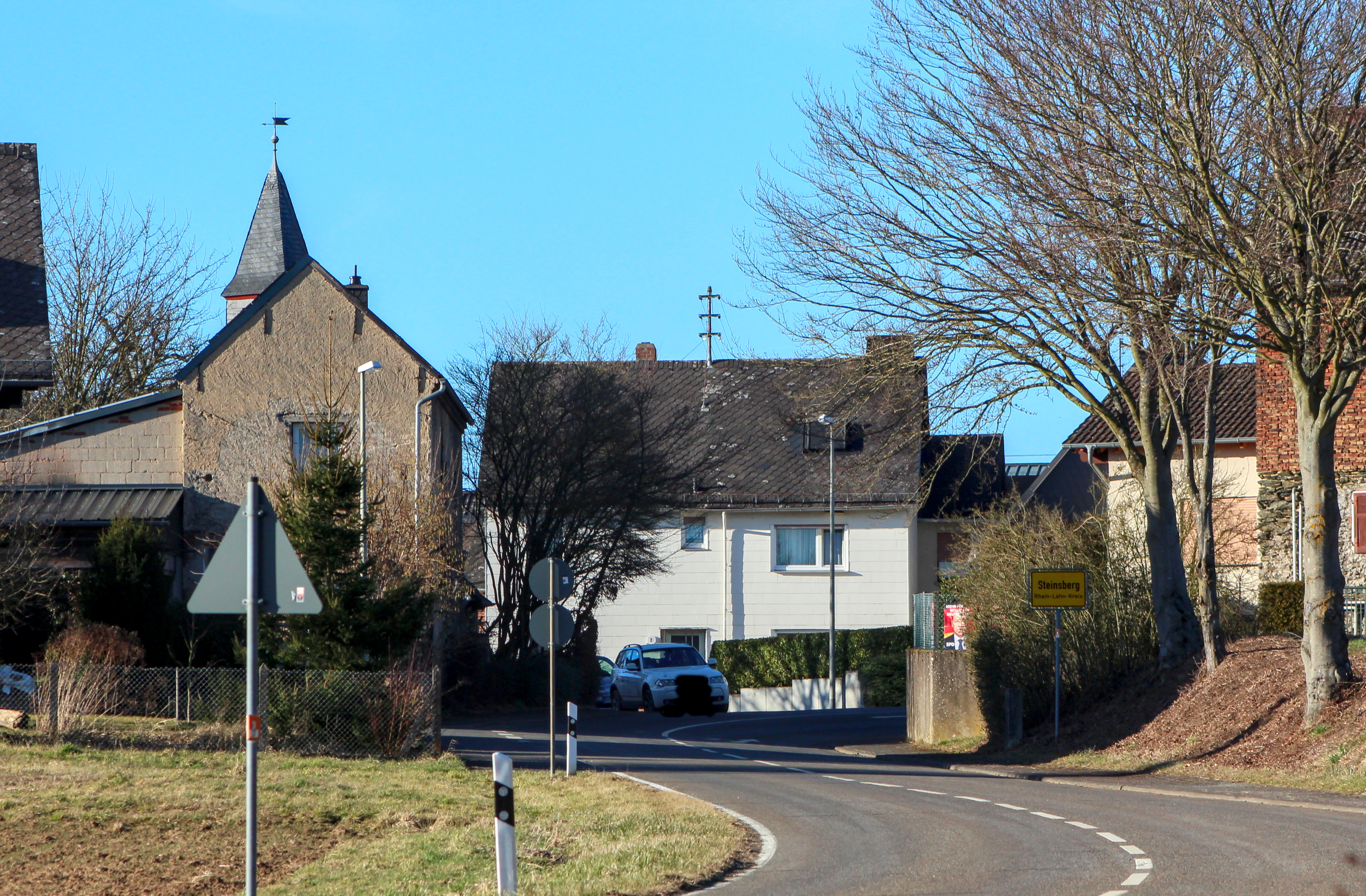

- Coat of arms

- Location of Steinsberg within Rhein-Lahn-Kreis district
- Interactive map of Steinsberg
- Location within Germany Location within Rhineland-Palatinate
- Coordinates: 50°19′28″N 7°56′38″E
- Country: Germany
- State: Rhineland-Palatinate
- District: Rhein-Lahn-Kreis
- Municipal assoc.: Diez

Government
  - Mayor (2019–24): Timo Reinhardt

Area
  - Total: 2.90 km^{2} (1.12 sq mi)
- Elevation: 234 m (768 ft)

Population (2025-12-31)
  - Total: 243
  - Density: 83.8/km^{2} (217/sq mi)
- Time zone: UTC+01:00 (CET)
  - Summer (DST): UTC+02:00 (CEST)
- Postal codes: 56379
- Dialling codes: 06439
- Vehicle registration: EMS, DIZ, GOH

Steinsberg is a municipality in the district of Rhein-Lahn, in Rhineland-Palatinate, in western Germany. It belongs to the association community of Diez.
