= Lords von Scheidt genannt Weschpfennig =

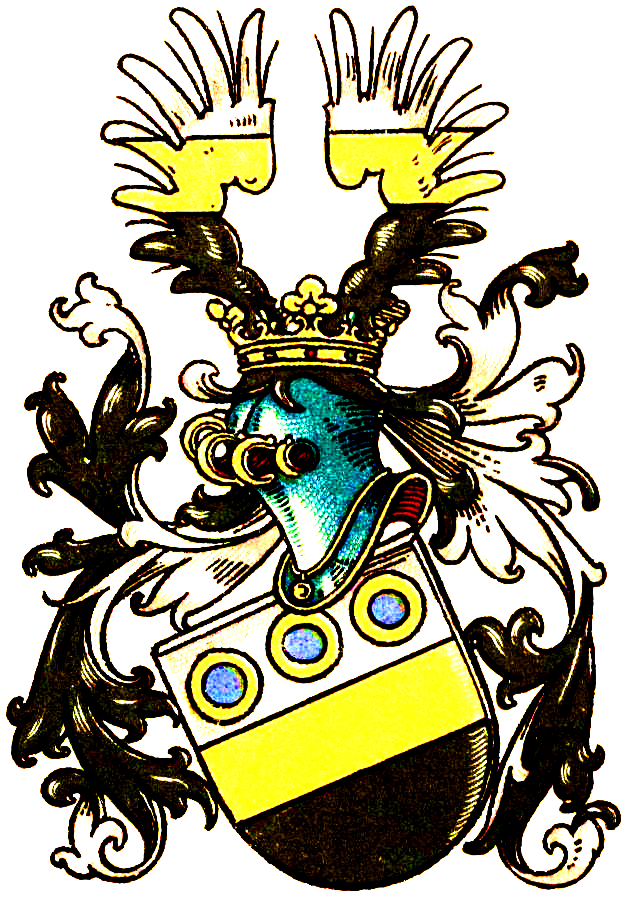
Coat of arms of Scheidt genannt Weschpfennig family

The lords von Scheidt genannt Weschpfennig were an ancient German noble family, who resided in the Bergi county. They were elevated to the rank of baron on 27 January 1642.

== Origin ==
The von Scheidt genannt Weschpfennig clan had originated near Scheidt, and spread in the area of Cologne, Düsseldorf, and Jülich since the fourteenth century. They are said to have participated in the battle of Worringen in 1288 as allies of the count of Berg. They acquired a property in Scheid near Ruppichteroth in the middle of the 14th century, called themselves von Scheidt, with the addition of "Weschpfennig". Further acquisitions of property were added in Ruppichteroth, Wingenbach, Rötzingshofen, Broel, Saurenbach, castle Freusburg near Betzdorf and castle Heltorf in Angermund above Düsseldorf.

== History ==
The first recorded person in the Scheidt/Scheyde gt. Weschpfennig family line is Johann vame Scheyde geheissen von Burchenauwe (Bülgenauel), who is officially recorded in 1378, 1407, 1408 and 1441. Bülgenauel is a place in what is nowadays called Hennef near Stadt Blankenberg. Johann was Married to Agnes von Hondenberg. Also known as von Hunnenberg, and was stepfather to her son and daughter Johann and Christine (‘Styna’) von Hunnenberg. Lacquer seals on historic documents show Johann vame Scheyde to be the earliest known progenitor of the von Scheidt gen. Weschpfennig family.

The second recorded person that shows no relation yet with aforementioned Johann is Engelbert vame Scheyde genannt Wispennynck, born in 1402 in Scheid, who married Barbara Elisa von Mirbach at house Buergel in 1434. In 1438 he was mentioned as Vogt and Schult-eis of the city of Much. Duke Gerhard von Jülich-Berg gave him the rights of the properties in the Kirchspiel area of Ruppichteroth, including the Schoenenberg chapel in 1442. After his participation in the Hubertus-war on 3 November 1444 he was honoured with the order of Hubertus. He died in 1469.

Engelberts eldest son Johann, born in 1441, married Agnes Anna Sabina von Leyen at Leyen (most likely Haus Leyen in Engelskirchen). He died in 1498 at the property in Broel (now known as Herrenbroel near Ruppichteroth).

In 1470, one Wilhelm von Scheidt genannt Weschpfennig is recorded as Rentmeister in Blankenberg.

Between 1474 and 1617 the family became the lords of Freusburg castle. Later, there was a long legal battle about who owned the property. It can be seen as one of the longest legal quarrels in German history, lasting several centuries. The last to have been sued was emperor Wilhelm II.

Johann Heinrich Scheidt genannt Weschpfennig was born in Scheid in 1476. He married Bona Greta von Seelbach of Menden in 1511 and died in Scheid in 1544. His brother Engelbert was born 1479 and was lord of Broel and Amtmann of Schoenenberg. He and his wife Anna von Schnellenberg donated the chapel of Schoenenberg to Ruppichteroth. Inscriptions there indicate that he died in 1546. Engelbert’s other sons, Gerhard Gottfried and Johann, died around 1542/4 in Hungary in the war against the Turkish armies.

Johann Heinrich’s son was Rorich von Scheide genannt Weschpfennig who was born in 1518 and married his second wife Anna von Kaldenbach zu Overbach in 1541 in Much. He died in 1565.

Rorich von Scheide’s son was Wilhelm von Scheid genannt Weschpfennig zu Heltorf. Wilhelm had six state parliament authorized Knight's seats in his property. He acquired the main house Bröl in 1569 from his heir-entitled older brother Engelbert. Castle Heltorf and the office of Angermund in 1559 were received through his marriage. In 1584 he bought the state-capable courtyards of Saurenbach in the parish of Ruppichteroth, and in 1585 he appeared on the knight's note. He sold the Elsfeld house in the Blankenberg district to his brother Gotthard in 1600. Wilhelm acquired Rötzinghofen in the Miselohe district from an inheritance; from 1596 he is named as Lord of Rötzingshofen on the Knight's List. In 1596 he acquired the noble house of Bilkrath (Hof Pilkrath) in the Angermund district.

By the late 16th century, the von Scheidt’s became relatives of the von Spee.

== Barons [freiherren] ==
On 27 January 1642 Johann Bertram Weschpfennig von Scheidt (as he is called on the imperial documents in Vienna) was elevated to the noble rank of baron of the Empire (original title; rechsfreiherr) by Emperor Ferdinand the 3rd in Vienna. That title is hereditary. Johann Bertram was the son of Wilhelm von Scheid. In 1632 Johann Bertram became the Bergi marshal,’Kammerherr' and 'Amtmann' to Ángermund and Landsberg. As envoy of duke Wolfgang von Jülich-Berg, Johann Bertram baron von Scheidt genannt Weschpfennig was sent into the enemy lines to convince Swedish general Baudissin that the duke of Jülich-Berg remained neutral in the religious wars at that time (catholic vs reformed). This was written of by the Swedish Lord High Chancellor and confidant to Gustav Adolphus II, King of Sweden.

Philipp Wilhelm baron von Scheidt genannt Weschpfennig enrolled into the Austrian army in 1690. He became captain in 1716, Obristwachtmeister in 1721, and colonel in 1733. He participated in several battles. Between 1690 and 1697 he fought against the Turks with the siege of Belgrade and the battle of Zenta, in 1716/17 with the battle at Peterwardein, Temesvor and Belgrade. He held the command post of Radolfzell until his death.

== Notable members ==
- Rurich Herr von Scheidt genaant Weschfennig (1518–1585)
- Wilhelm von Scheid genannt Weschpfennig (1535–1611)
- Johann Heinrich von Veit Scheidt genannt Weschpfennig (1523–1585)
- Johann Bertram Baron von Scheidt genannt Weschpfennig (1580–1662)

== Coat of arms ==
Coat of arms of Lords von Scheidt genannt Weschpfennig

The family coat of arms is blazoned as follows: party per fess: I argent three annulets azure; II sable; a fess or overall. A depiction of the coat of arms can today still be found in Duesseldorf, Altestadt 14, above the door. The house belonged to Johann Bertram baron von Scheidt genannt Weschpfennig. He bought it from Anna, the widow of the "Licentiat" Adolph Steinhuys, in 1626 for 1.700 Reichstaler. Johan Bertram was married to Margarethe von Tengnagell, whose coat of arms is seen at the right of the Scheidt coat of arms.
