= Wasenbach =

- Municipality
- Coat of arms

- Location of Wasenbach within Rhein-Lahn-Kreis district
- Interactive map of Wasenbach
- Location within Germany Location within Rhineland-Palatinate
- Coordinates: 50°19′9″N 7°57′59″E
- Country: Germany
- State: Rhineland-Palatinate
- District: Rhein-Lahn-Kreis
- Municipal assoc.: Diez

Government
  - Mayor (2019–24): Reiner Schwarz

Area
  - Total: 2.40 km^{2} (0.93 sq mi)
- Elevation: 200 m (660 ft)

Population (2025-12-31)
  - Total: 309
  - Density: 129/km^{2} (333/sq mi)
- Time zone: UTC+01:00 (CET)
  - Summer (DST): UTC+02:00 (CEST)
- Postal codes: 56370
- Dialling codes: 06432
- Vehicle registration: EMS, DIZ, GOH
- Website: www.wasenbach.com

Wasenbach is a municipality in the district of Rhein-Lahn, in Rhineland-Palatinate, in western Germany. It belongs to the association community of Diez.
