= Eppenrod =

- Municipality
- Coat of arms

- Location of Eppenrod within Rhein-Lahn-Kreis district
- Interactive map of Eppenrod
- Location within Germany Location within Rhineland-Palatinate
- Coordinates: 50°24′17″N 7°55′47″E
- Country: Germany
- State: Rhineland-Palatinate
- District: Rhein-Lahn-Kreis
- Municipal assoc.: Diez

Government
  - Mayor (2019–24): Oliver Lankes

Area
  - Total: 6.98 km^{2} (2.69 sq mi)
- Elevation: 290 m (950 ft)

Population (2025-12-31)
  - Total: 732
  - Density: 105/km^{2} (272/sq mi)
- Time zone: UTC+01:00 (CET)
  - Summer (DST): UTC+02:00 (CEST)
- Postal codes: 65558
- Dialling codes: 06485
- Vehicle registration: EMS, DIZ, GOH

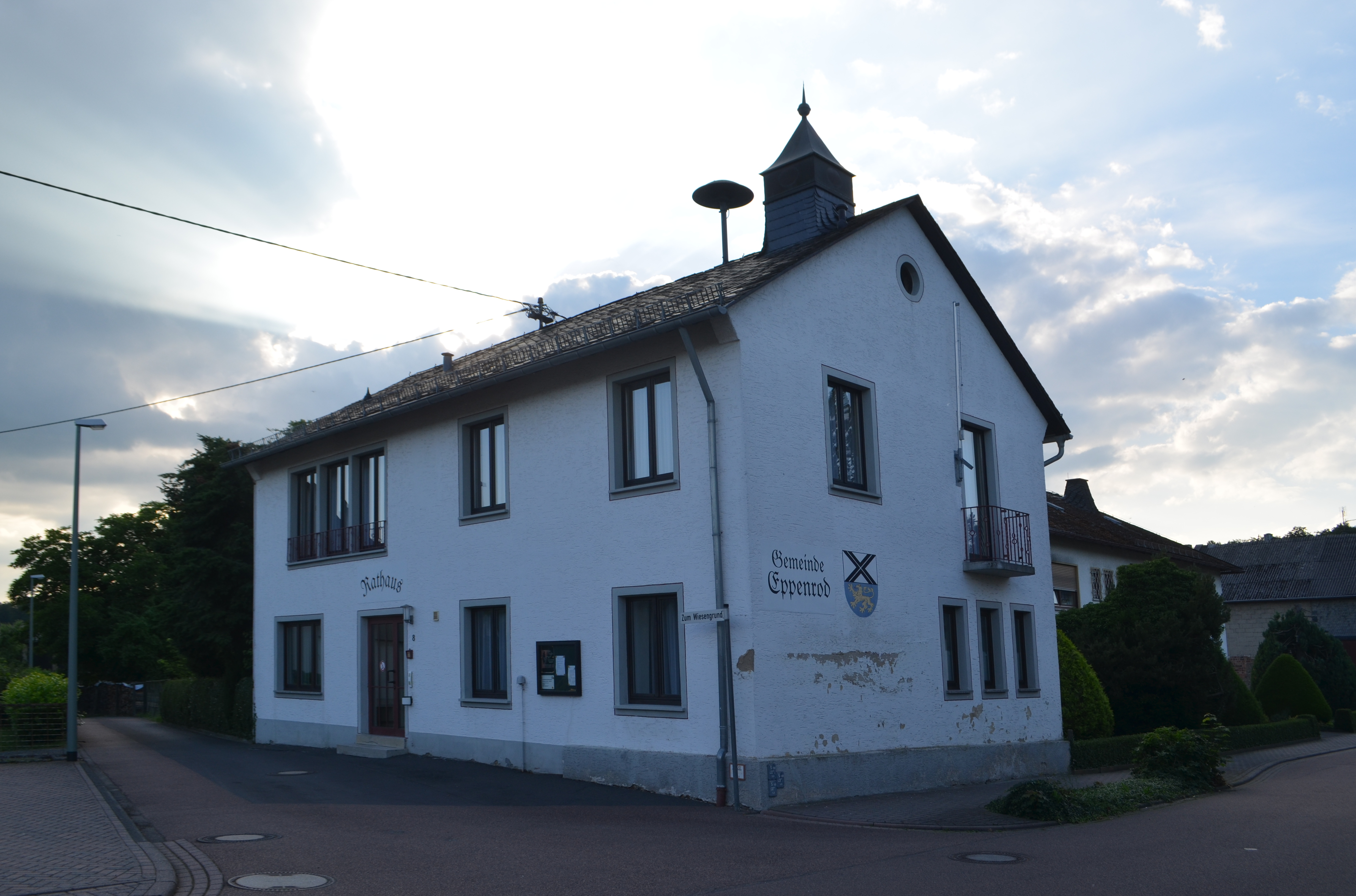
Town hall Eppenrod

Eppenrod is a municipality in the district of Rhein-Lahn, in Rhineland-Palatinate, in western Germany. It belongs to the association community of Diez.

== Infrastructure ==
The wind park Eppenrod produces electricity through five wind turbines located on a mountain in the area of Eppenrod.

== Traffic ==
Eppenrod is served by the bus lines 450 (Limburg - Diez - Nentershausen - Montabaur and 575 (Diez - Nentershausen) and located in the area of the transport association Verkehrsverbund Rhein-Mosel (VRM). Nearest train stop is Niedererbach at the Limburg-Staffel - Siershahn railway (RB29) (Limburg - Diez Ost - Montabaur - Wirges - Siershahn Nearest motorway access is Diez at the A3.
