= Langenscheid =

- Municipality
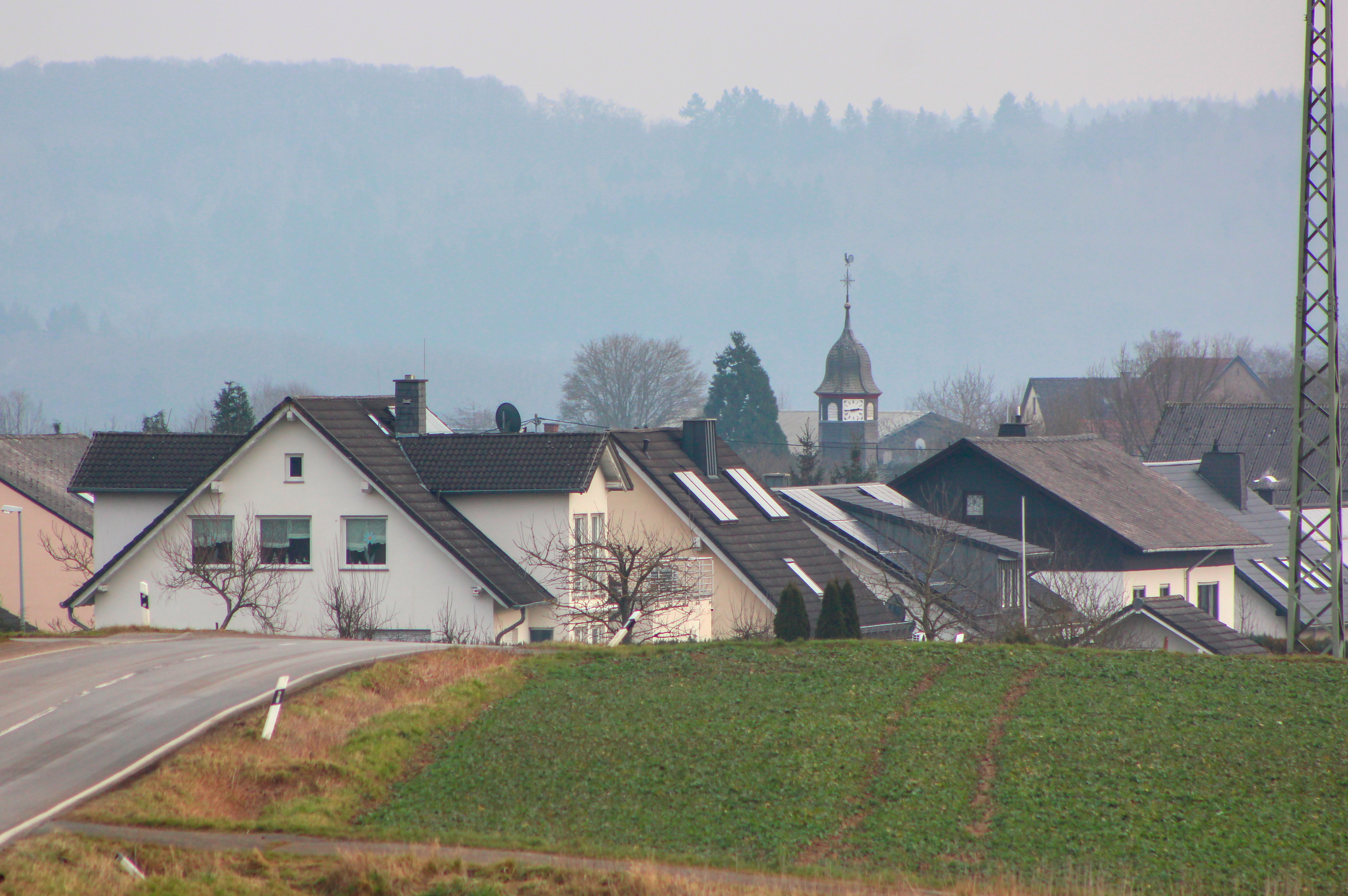

- Coat of arms

- Location of Langenscheid within Rhein-Lahn-Kreis district
- Interactive map of Langenscheid
- Location within Germany Location within Rhineland-Palatinate
- Coordinates: 50°21′25″N 7°57′11″E
- Country: Germany
- State: Rhineland-Palatinate
- District: Rhein-Lahn-Kreis
- Municipal assoc.: Diez

Government
  - Mayor (2019–24): Ulrich Strutt

Area
  - Total: 8.93 km^{2} (3.45 sq mi)
- Elevation: 242 m (794 ft)

Population (2025-12-31)
  - Total: 515
  - Density: 57.7/km^{2} (149/sq mi)
- Time zone: UTC+01:00 (CET)
  - Summer (DST): UTC+02:00 (CEST)
- Postal codes: 65558
- Dialling codes: 06439
- Vehicle registration: EMS, DIZ, GOH

Langenscheid (German pronunciation: [ˈlaŋənʃaɪt]) is a municipality in the district of Rhein-Lahn, in Rhineland-Palatinate, in western Germany. It belongs to the association community of Diez.
