= Hambach (Diez) =

- Municipality
- Coat of arms

- Location of Hambach within Rhein-Lahn-Kreis district
- Interactive map of Hambach
- Location within Germany Location within Rhineland-Palatinate
- Coordinates: 50°23′53″N 7°58′52″E
- Country: Germany
- State: Rhineland-Palatinate
- District: Rhein-Lahn-Kreis
- Municipal assoc.: Diez

Government
  - Mayor (2019–24): Peter Sehr

Area
  - Total: 2.76 km^{2} (1.07 sq mi)
- Elevation: 156 m (512 ft)

Population (2025-12-31)
  - Total: 503
  - Density: 182/km^{2} (472/sq mi)
- Time zone: UTC+01:00 (CET)
  - Summer (DST): UTC+02:00 (CEST)
- Postal codes: 65582
- Dialling codes: 06432
- Vehicle registration: EMS, DIZ, GOH
- Website: www.gemeinde-hambach.de

Hambach (German pronunciation: [ˈhambax]) is a municipality in the district of Rhein-Lahn, in Rhineland-Palatinate, in western Germany. It belongs to the association community of Diez.

== History ==
Hambach was first mentioned in 1290 in a necrology from "Stift St. Lubentius zu Dietkirchen". Hambach belonged to the shire of Diez. From 1794 temporarily occupied by the French, the village became part of the Herzogtum Nassau, which was annexed to Prussia in 1866. Since 1946 the village is part of the Rhineland-Palatinate.

== Public institutions ==
In 1890 a school was built, but it was closed due to short of pupils in 1936. It was reused from 1947 to 1961. Hambach has a volunteer fire brigade, which was founded in 1971.

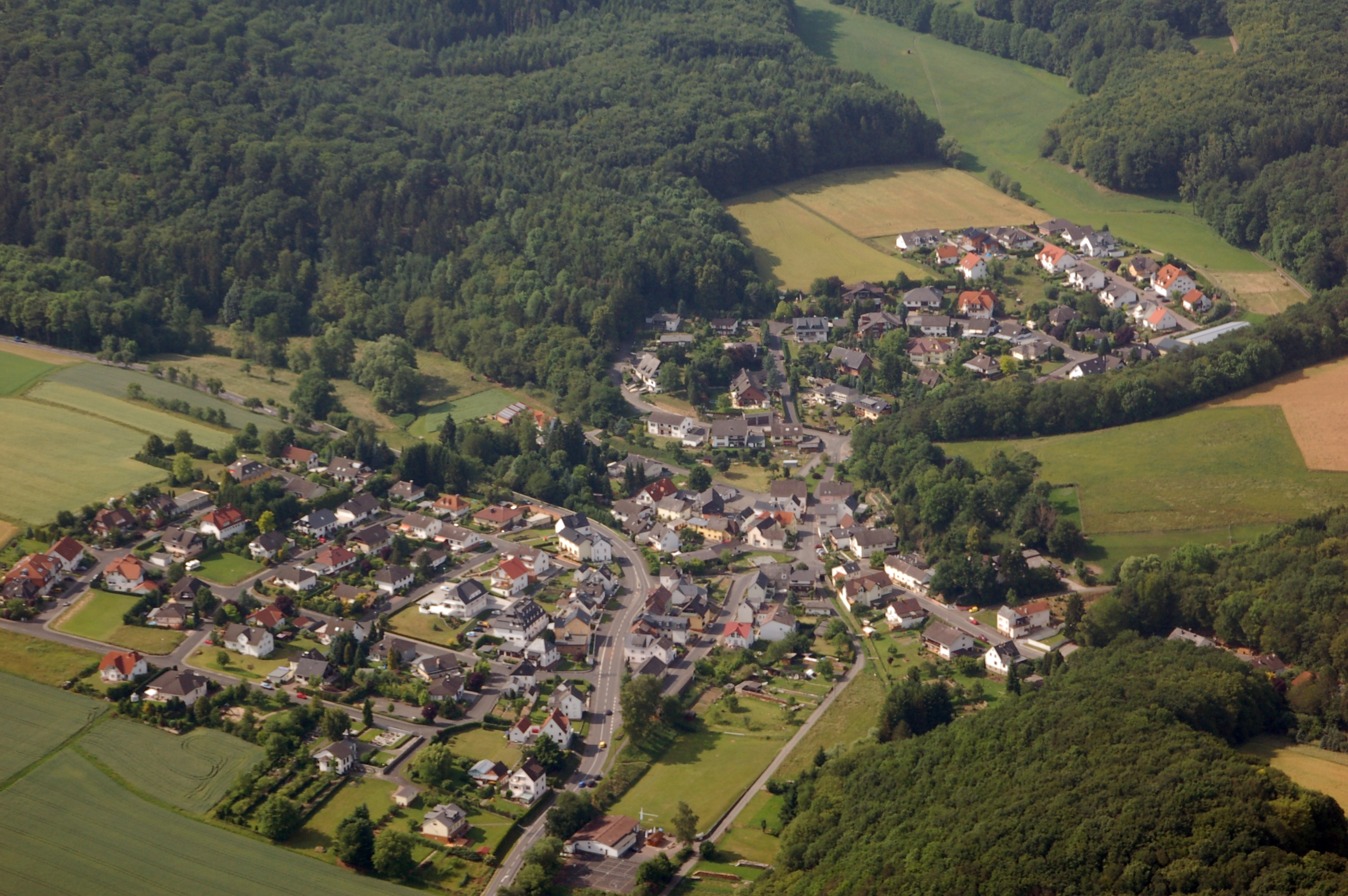
Aerial photography 2007

== Transport ==
The local bus lines 450 and 575 connect Hambach to the public transport, Hambach is located in the zone number 520 of the public transport association Verkehrsverbund Rhein-Mosel (VRM).
