= Rorich von Scheidt =

Rorich von Scheidt, genannt Weßpfennig (1518–1585), was a German nobleman as the Lord of Scheid, Bröl, Lohmar, Fussberg, Buisdorf, Etzenbach, Hönscheid, Hülscheid, and Schönenberg. He came from the von Scheidt family, and was known for his role as Landjägermeister for the Blankenberg office.

A figure of influence in the Rhineland, he was active in the administration of various estates and knightly affairs during the mid-16th century.

== Life ==
Rorich (Rurich) von Scheidt genannt Weschpfennig was born in 1518 in Scheidt, the son of Johann von Scheidt genannt Weschpfennig, Lord of Scheid (1458–1525) and Jutta von Seelbach (1460–1503). He was a member of the von Scheidt noble family, which held extensive lands and influence. At some point in the mid 16th century, Rorich secured the Blankenberg office and the surrounding regions of what is now Rheinland-Pfalz, Germany. His family had long been established among the Rhenish nobility, accumulating wealth and titles through land ownership, military service, and strategic marriages.

== Marriage and Issue ==
Rorich married twice. His first marriage was to Anna von Kaldenbach zu Overheid (1495-1530) with whom he had at least four sons:

- Engelbert von Scheidt genannt Weschpfennig, Lord of Bröl, Buisdorf, and Hülscheid (1520–1584)
- Johann Heinrich Veit von Scheidt genannt Weschpfennig (1523–1585), Lord of Lohmar and Fußberg
- Gertrud von Scheidt genannt Weschpfennig (1526–1592), married to Gotthard von Müllenark zu Bell (1529–1581)
- Gotthard von Scheidt genannt Weschpfennig (1528–1622), Lord of Bettringen, married Maria von Troisdorf (d. 1628)
- Volmar von Scheidt genannt Weschpfennig (1530-1582), Lord of Scheid, Etzenbach, and Schöneberg. Married to Katharina von Dernbach

After Anna’s passing in 1530, Rorich married Anna von Buchenhauer genannt Teufenschlat. This second marriage produced additional offspring:

- Peter von Scheidt genannt Weschpfennig (1531–1593), abbot of Springersbach Monastery
- Adolphus ‘Adolf’ von Scheidt genannt Weschpfennig (1533-1589), abbot of Corvey Monastery
- Wilhelm Heinrich von Scheidt genannt Weschpfennig (1535–1611), Count Palatine of Solinberg, Burg and Beyenberg
- Adelheid von Scheidt genannt Weschpfennig (1537-1621), married to Johann Sturm zum Scheid (1520–1614)
- Anna von Scheidt genannt Weschpfennig (1540–1593), married Heinrich von Kelterhausen (d. 1610)

== Death ==
On 3 Aug 1565, Rorich von Scheidt died at his estate in Schöneberg, Altenkirchen, Rheinland-Pfalz, Germany.

== Inheritance contract ==
In the minutes, the noble and honourable brothers of the proceedings are mentioned:

- Engelbert
- Johann
- Volmar
- Wilhelm
- Gotthard
- Peter
- Adolf

The latter two served as stewards at Springiersbach Monastery and Corvey.

=== Noble Privilege ===
As the eldest, Engelbert received the noble privilege and was allowed to retain the ancestral family home in Bröl. However, Wilhelm negotiated this from him and reached an agreement with the other brothers. Wilhelm received half of the 15 guilders of Manneld that their father had collected, while the other half went to his two brothers who had entered the clergy. The inventory and crops were divided. Wilhelm waived outstanding claims from the inheritance, including those against Anton von Holzhausen, and assumed all debts except for the dowry of their sister Adelheid, which was to be covered by the four secular brothers. In exchange, Wilhelm received the pension from Ersdorf in the County of Neuenahr.

=== Further Inheritance of Wilhelm ===
Additionally, Wilhelm received the lands cultivated by their deceased mother, including:

- The Bitze above the estate
- The Siefenstück
- The Hinterharth
- The Wingertsgarten
- The Fußberger and the Eicher Field
- The Burghardt from Mühlenauel to the gate on the Fußberger path
- The small forest called Ecker
- The bushes in Barnemich (half in the Kelterser Busch, half in the Bammestellen)
- The Velkener bushes in the Nutscheid
- The house meadow and the Auelswiese (Stone Meadow)
- The meadow above the Eicher Pond
- The pond with two adjacent pools
- The Gecksweiher and the fishing rights in the parish up to Katzauel

Furthermore, he received the right to expand the use of the limestone quarries between Danhardt and Hinterhardt up to the road between Scheid and the Holy Oak for construction purposes on the Scheid, Etzenbach, and Schönenberg estates. However, he was only allowed to burn lime for fertilizer sparingly and as long as there was available wood on site.

=== Johann ===
Johann received:

- The estate at Lohmar
- The estate at Fußberg (opposite Bröl)
- The estate and tithe at Hönscheid
- The tithe on the mountain
- A third of the tithe from half of Barnemich

=== Engelbert ===
Engelbert received:

- The estate at Buisdorf and all surrounding lands
- Half of the estate at Buch
- The estate at Hülscheid
- The Bitzenwiese
- The forestry rights in Kaldauen, Niederpleis, and other areas
- A quarter of the Kelterser bushes and the Bammestellen
- The Kersekorf near House Attenbach

=== Volmar ===
In addition to his inheritance, Volmar received:

- The estate at Scheid (including the Katzenaueler meadow below the oil mill)
- Two parts of half of Barnemich
- A quarter of the Kelterser Busch
- A tithe in Jünkersfeld
- The inheritance at Kesselscheid
- The Bitze at Kämerscheid
- The estate at Etzenbach
- The estate at Schönenberg
- The small estate at Huppach
- Forty acres in the Nutscheid
- The small estate at Gutmannseichen

=== Gotthard ===
Gotthard received:

- The estate at Bettringen with all rights
- The estate at Süchterscheid
- The estate at Rankenhohn
- The forest near Uckerath
- The Schelfwinkel near House Attenbach

=== Deferred Divisions ===
The allocation of the Wingert at Hennef (Sieg) and Blankenberg, as well as certain other rights and properties, remained unresolved for the time being, partly due to further deaths and marriages.
