= Treisbach =

Treisbach may refer to two rivers of Hesse, Germany:

- Treisbach (Gilsa), tributary of the Gilsa
- Treisbach (Wetschaft), tributary of the Wetschaft

See also: Dreisbach (disambiguation)
