= Hirschberg, Rhineland-Palatinate =

Hirschberg
- Municipality
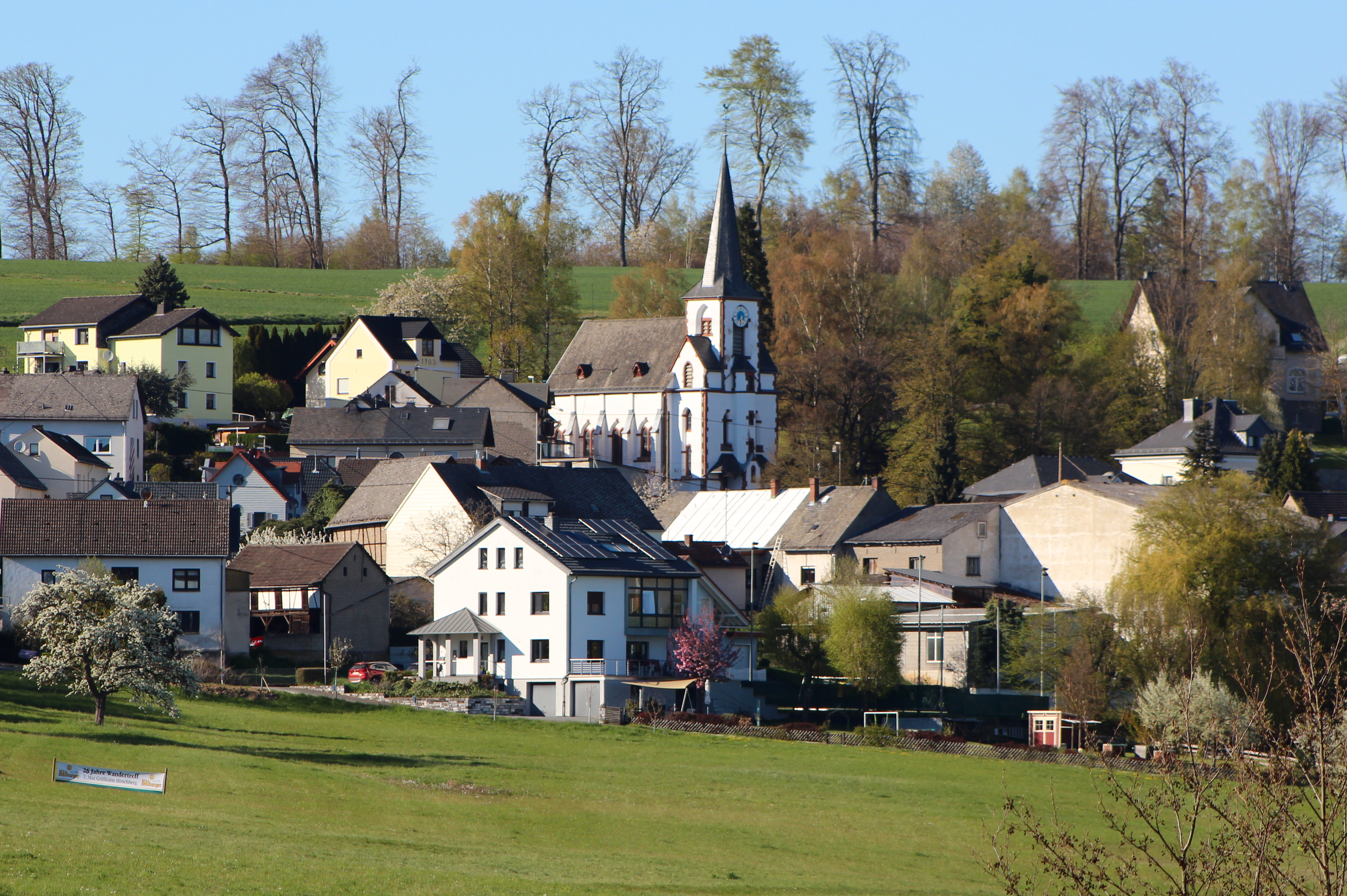

- Coat of arms

- Location of Hirschberg within Rhein-Lahn-Kreis district
- Interactive map of Hirschberg
- Location within Germany Location within Rhineland-Palatinate
- Coordinates: 50°22′43.57″N 7°55′29.47″E
- Country: Germany
- State: Rhineland-Palatinate
- District: Rhein-Lahn-Kreis
- Municipal assoc.: Diez

Government
  - Mayor (2019–24): Birgit Rutenbeck

Area
  - Total: 2.50 km^{2} (0.97 sq mi)
- Elevation: 300 m (980 ft)

Population (2025-12-31)
  - Total: 400
  - Density: 160/km^{2} (410/sq mi)
- Time zone: UTC+01:00 (CET)
  - Summer (DST): UTC+02:00 (CEST)
- Postal codes: 65558
- Dialling codes: 06439
- Vehicle registration: EMS, DIZ, GOH

Hirschberg (German pronunciation: [ˈhɪʁʃˌbɛʁk]) is a municipality in the district of Rhein-Lahn, in Rhineland-Palatinate, in western Germany. It belongs to the association community of Diez.

== Transport ==
Hirschberg is located in thenzone number 520 of the transport association Verkehrsverbund Rhein-Mosel (VRM), it is served by the local bus lines number 450 (Montabaur – Diez – Limburg) and 575 (Nentershausen – Diez). The nearest train station is Diez station.
