= Diez (Verbandsgemeinde) =

- Verbandsgemeinde
- Location of Diez within Rhein-Lahn-Kreis district
- Interactive map of Diez
- Location within Germany Location within Rhineland-Palatinate
- Coordinates: 50°22′N 8°01′E
- Country: Germany
- State: Rhineland-Palatinate
- District: Rhein-Lahn-Kreis
- Seat: Diez
- Subdivisions: 23 municipalities

Area
  - Total: 106.19 km^{2} (41.00 sq mi)

Population (2025-12-31)
  - Total: 25,873
  - Density: 243.65/km^{2} (631.05/sq mi)
- Time zone: UTC+01:00 (CET)
  - Summer (DST): UTC+02:00 (CEST)
- Website: www.vgdiez.de

Diez is a Verbandsgemeinde ("collective municipality") in the Rhein-Lahn-Kreis, in Rhineland-Palatinate, Germany. Its seat is in Diez.

The Verbandsgemeinde Diez consists of the following Ortsgemeinden ("local municipalities"):

1. Altendiez
2. Aull
3. Balduinstein
4. Birlenbach
5. Charlottenberg
6. Cramberg
7. Diez
8. Dörnberg
9. Eppenrod
10. Geilnau
11. Gückingen
12. Hambach
13. Heistenbach
14. Hirschberg
15. Holzappel
16. Holzheim
17. Horhausen
18. Isselbach
19. Langenscheid
20. Laurenburg
21. Scheidt
22. Steinsberg
23. Wasenbach
