= Holzheim, Rhineland-Palatinate =

Holzheim
- Municipality
- Coat of arms

- Location of Holzheim within Rhein-Lahn-Kreis district
- Interactive map of Holzheim
- Location within Germany Location within Rhineland-Palatinate
- Coordinates: 50°21′16.12″N 8°2′53.89″E
- Country: Germany
- State: Rhineland-Palatinate
- District: Rhein-Lahn-Kreis
- Municipal assoc.: Diez

Government
  - Mayor (2019–24): Werner Dittmar

Area
  - Total: 4.99 km^{2} (1.93 sq mi)
- Elevation: 130 m (430 ft)

Population (2025-12-31)
  - Total: 861
  - Density: 173/km^{2} (447/sq mi)
- Time zone: UTC+01:00 (CET)
  - Summer (DST): UTC+02:00 (CEST)
- Postal codes: 65558
- Dialling codes: 06432
- Vehicle registration: EMS, DIZ, GOH
- Website: www.holzheim-aar.de

Holzheim (German pronunciation: [ˈhɔltshaɪm]) is a municipality in the district of Rhein-Lahn, in Rhineland-Palatinate, in western Germany. It belongs to the association community of Diez.

== Transport links ==
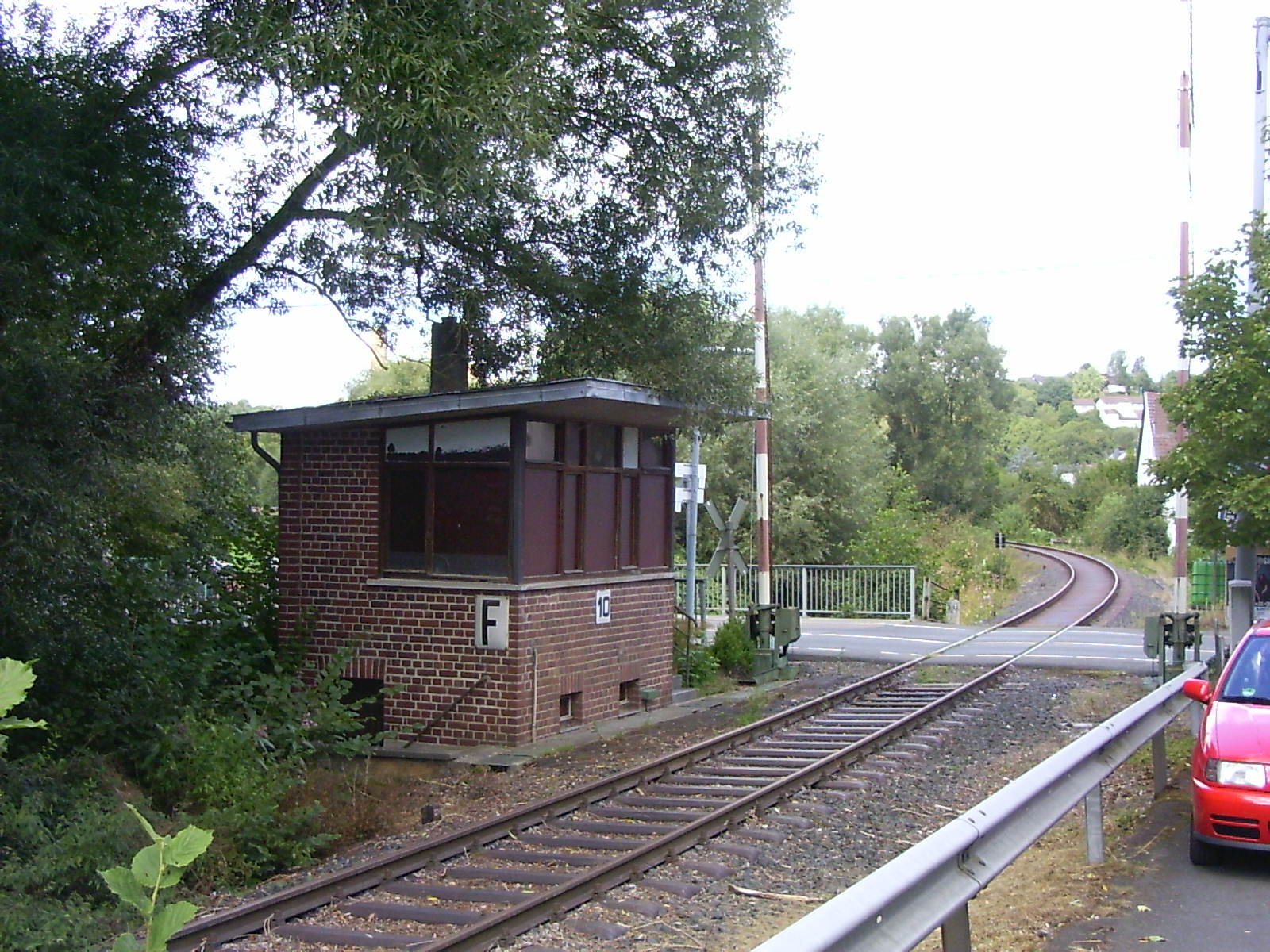
Railroad crossing of the Aar Valley Railway in Holzheim

Holzheim is located at the Aar Valley Railway although it's out of service and there wasn't a stop or station in Holzheim, the interest group Arbeitskreis Aartalbahn e. V. has the goal to conserve the line and uses it for railbike tours. The local bus line 570 runs from Limburg (Lahn) station via Diez and Hahnstätten to Michelbach. Holzheim is located in the area of the transport association Verkehrsverbund Rhein-Mosel (VRM), in the zone number 521.
