= Birlenbach =

- Municipality
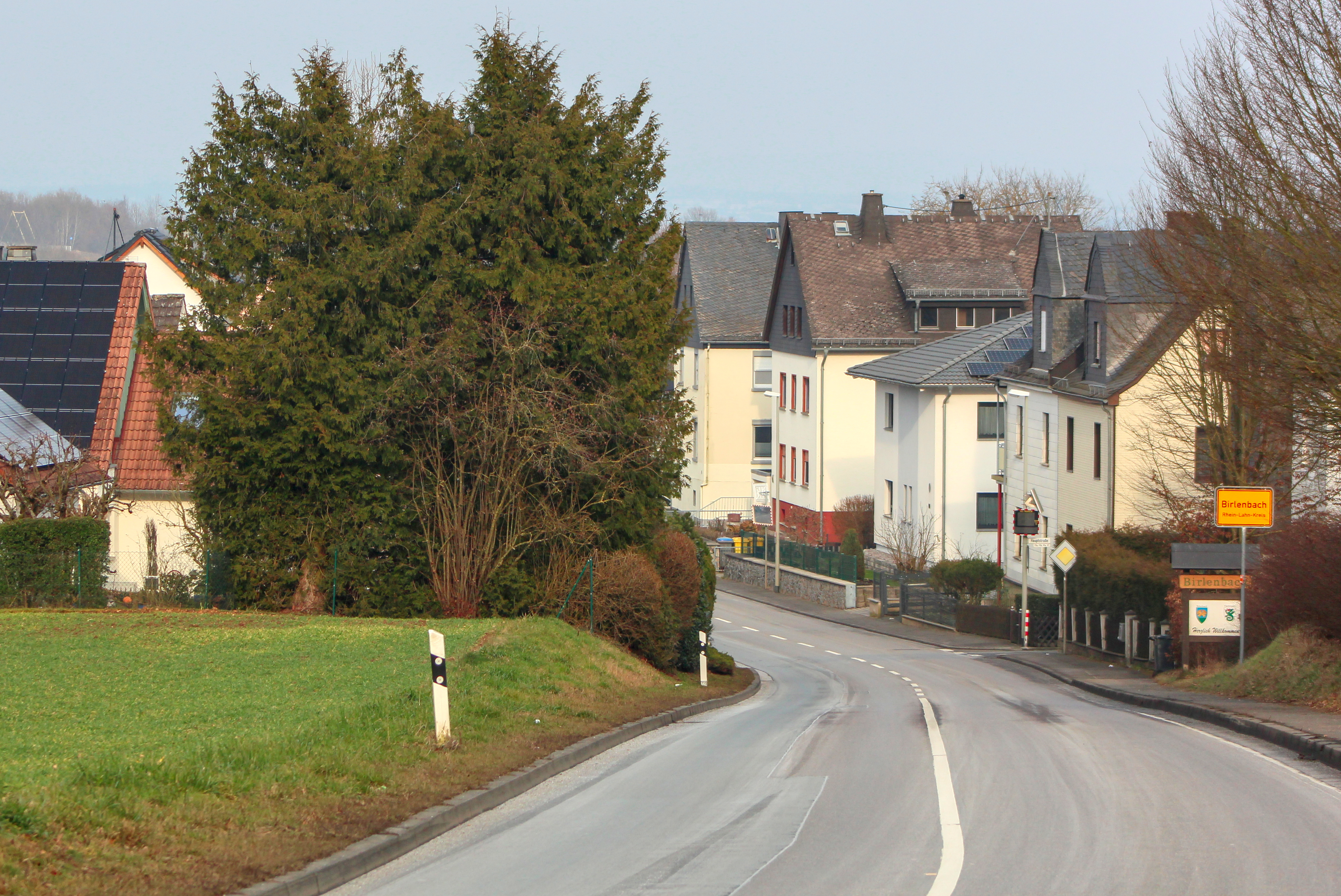

- Coat of arms

- Location of Birlenbach within Rhein-Lahn-Kreis district
- Interactive map of Birlenbach
- Location within Germany Location within Rhineland-Palatinate
- Coordinates: 50°21′31.25″N 8°0′7.22″E
- Country: Germany
- State: Rhineland-Palatinate
- District: Rhein-Lahn-Kreis
- Municipal assoc.: Diez
- Subdivisions: 2

Government
  - Mayor (2019–24): Georg Klein

Area
  - Total: 4.04 km^{2} (1.56 sq mi)
- Elevation: 175 m (574 ft)

Population (2025-12-31)
  - Total: 1,681
  - Density: 416/km^{2} (1,080/sq mi)
- Time zone: UTC+01:00 (CET)
  - Summer (DST): UTC+02:00 (CEST)
- Postal codes: 65626
- Dialling codes: 06432
- Vehicle registration: EMS, DIZ, GOH
- Website: www.birlenbach-fachingen.de

Birlenbach is a municipality in the district of Rhein-Lahn, in Rhineland-Palatinate, in western Germany. It belongs to the association community of Diez.

== Transport links ==
The train station, located in district Fachingen of Birlenbach, is served by line RB23 which goes from Limburg via Diez, Bad Ems, Koblenz and Andernach to Mayen, operated by section Lahn-Eifel-Bahn of Deutsche Bahn.
