= Heistenbach =

- Municipality
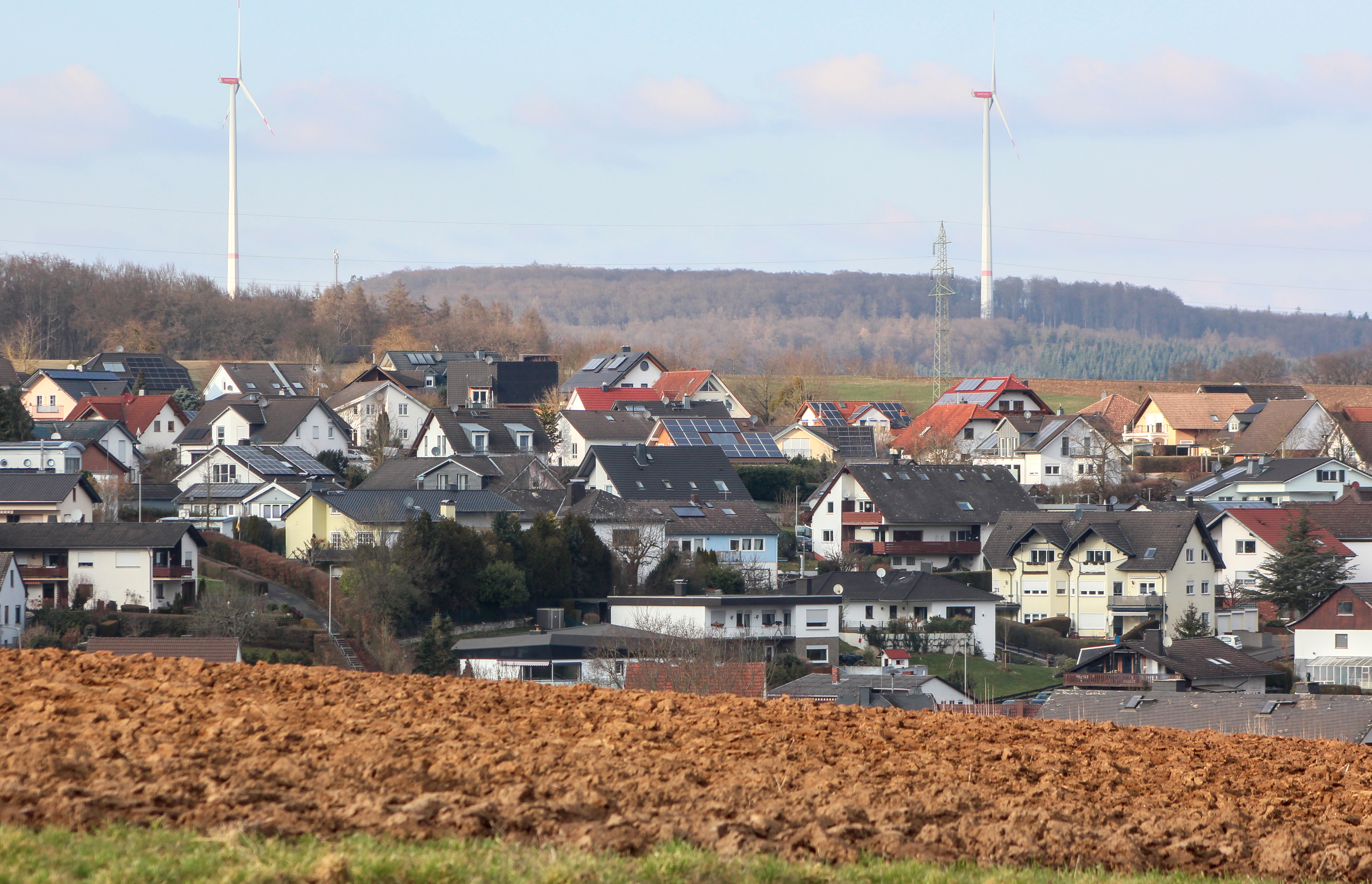

- Coat of arms

- Location of Heistenbach within Rhein-Lahn-Kreis district
- Interactive map of Heistenbach
- Location within Germany Location within Rhineland-Palatinate
- Coordinates: 50°22′46.70″N 7°59′8.39″E
- Country: Germany
- State: Rhineland-Palatinate
- District: Rhein-Lahn-Kreis
- Municipal assoc.: Diez

Government
  - Mayor (2019–24): Mirko Unkelbach

Area
  - Total: 5.26 km^{2} (2.03 sq mi)
- Elevation: 170 m (560 ft)

Population (2025-12-31)
  - Total: 1,039
  - Density: 198/km^{2} (512/sq mi)
- Time zone: UTC+01:00 (CET)
  - Summer (DST): UTC+02:00 (CEST)
- Postal codes: 65558
- Dialling codes: 06432
- Vehicle registration: EMS, DIZ, GOH

Heistenbach (German pronunciation: [ˈhaɪstn̩bax]) is a municipality in the district of Rhein-Lahn, in Rhineland-Palatinate, in western Germany. It belongs to the association community of Diez. The municipal council has 16 seats.
