= Cramberg =

- Municipality
- Coat of arms

- Location of Cramberg within Rhein-Lahn-Kreis district
- Interactive map of Cramberg
- Location within Germany Location within Rhineland-Palatinate
- Coordinates: 50°20′28.12″N 7°56′40.100″E
- Country: Germany
- State: Rhineland-Palatinate
- District: Rhein-Lahn-Kreis
- Municipal assoc.: Diez

Government
  - Mayor (2024–present): Simone Spies

Area
  - Total: 5.25 km^{2} (2.03 sq mi)
- Elevation: 200 m (660 ft)

Population (2025-12-31)
  - Total: 495
  - Density: 94.3/km^{2} (244/sq mi)
- Time zone: UTC+01:00 (CET)
  - Summer (DST): UTC+02:00 (CEST)
- Postal codes: 65558
- Dialling codes: 06439
- Vehicle registration: EMS, DIZ, GOH
- Website: www.cramberg.de

Cramberg is a municipality in the Nassau Nature Park in the district of Rhein-Lahn, in Rhineland-Palatinate, in western Germany. It belongs to the association community of Diez.

== Geography ==
Cramberg is situated at the foothills of the Taunus in the western Hintertaunus on the edge of a steep slope above the Lahn at 200 m above sea level, about 100 metres above the course of the Lahn river at the so-called "Cramberger Bogen". The Lahn forms the boundary of the municipality over a distance of about 7.5 km.

== History ==
Cramberg was first documented in 1261. A chapel was first mentioned in 1319, a second one was built in 1516. The Protestant church in its present form dates from 1791.

In 1348 a castle was built by Heinrich von Crampburg, but it was heavily damaged during the Thirty Years' War. Its remains served as a quarry in the 19th century, so that today, apart from the remains of the cellar vaults, nothing remains of this castle.

From 1806 the village was part of the Duchy of Nassau, which was annexed by Prussia in 1866. Since 1946 the village has been part of the state of Rhineland-Palatinate.

In the 17th century an elementary school was established in Cramberg, the lessons were first held in the private homes of the teachers. It was not until 1736 that a residential building was acquired, which was used as a school. The first school was replaced by a new building in 1782, this building was demolished in 1978 and stood on the place where the village square is today.

The population developed in the 19th and 20th century as follows: 1843: 476 inhabitants, 1927: 545 inhabitants, 1964: 561 inhabitants.

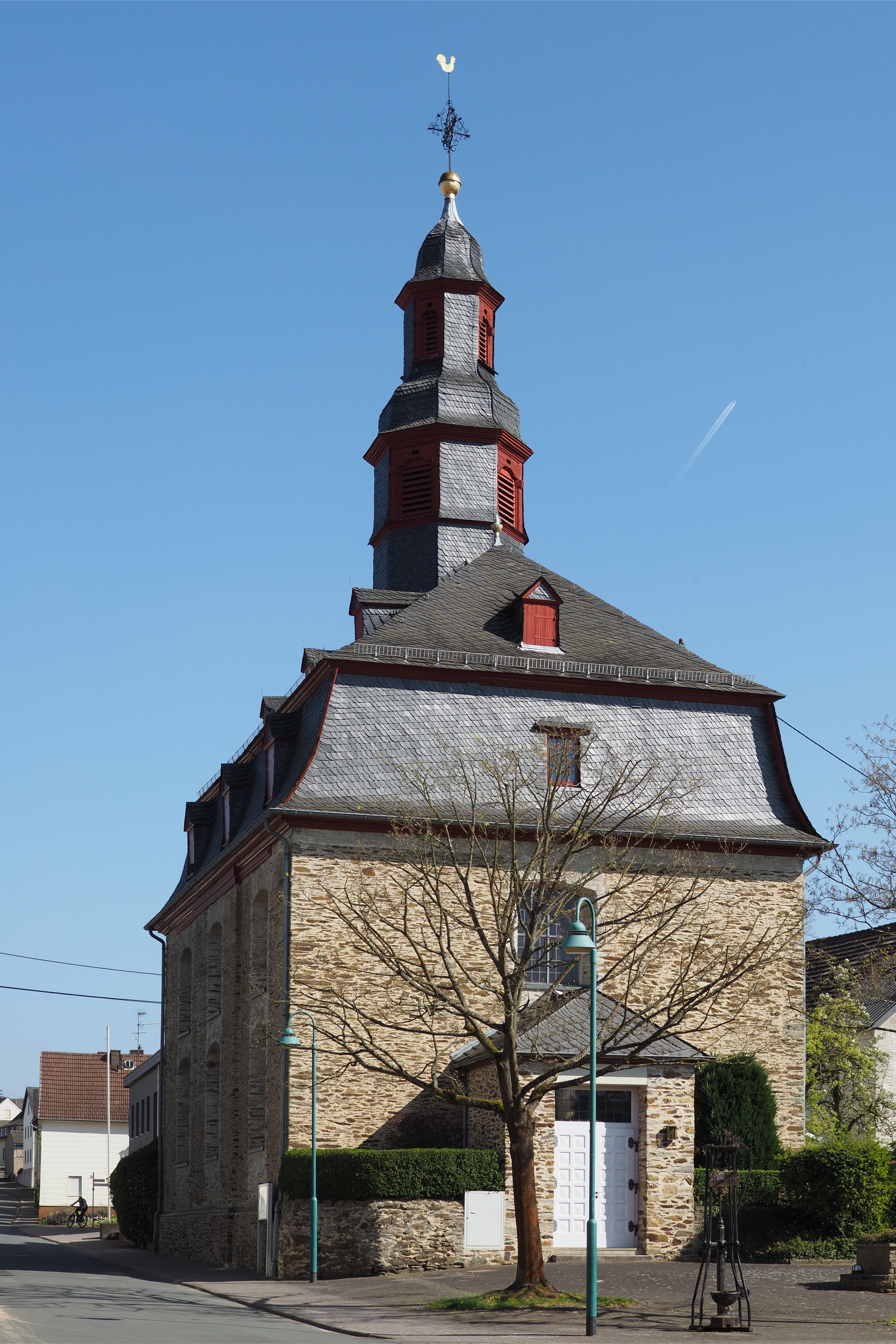
Protestant church in Cramberg

== Buildings ==
Below the village of Cramberg lies the Lahn power station, which was completed in 1927. In 1926, an approximately 700 m long water tunnel was dug at the narrow point of the "Cramberger Bogen", which connects the Lahn above and below the "Cramberger Bogen", while the Lahn flows around the "Cramberger Bogen" for about 7 km. The water drives three turbines at the lower end of the tunnel due to the difference in height of 9 m. The Lahn power station has a capacity of 3.2 MW and generates 18 million kilowatt hours of electricity per year.

Since 1862, trains on the Lahntal railway have been running through the 732 m long Cramberg Tunnel. At the time of its commissioning, the Cramberg Tunnel was the longest tunnel in Germany.
