= Johann von Scheidt =

Johann Heinrich Veit von Scheidt genannt Weschpfennig (1523–1585) was a prominent nobleman and official in the Duchy of Berg during the 16th century. As a member of the von Scheidt family, Johann was Lord of Lohmar, Hörscheid and Fußberg. He served as the Amtmann (bailiff) of Porz and held the title of Schützenmeister (master of the marksmen).

== Early Life and Family Background ==
Johann was the son of Rorich von Scheidt genannt Weschpfennig and Anna von Buchenhauer genannt Taufenschlag (Tuefenschlat). The von Scheidt genannt Weschpfennig family was a distinguished noble lineage in the Bergisches Land, with a history of service in various official capacities. Johann's familial connections and inheritance positioned him to continue this tradition of public service.

== Career and Public Service ==
As Amtmann of Porz, Johann was responsible for overseeing local administration, justice, and the enforcement of ducal authority. His role as Schützenmeister involved organizing and supervising shooting guilds, which were important civic institutions in the region.

In 1573, Johann is documented as Amtmann of Porz in official records. For instance, on March 31, 1573, Duke Wilhelm of Jülich-Kleve-Berg issued a decree addressed to Johann von Scheidt genannt Weschpfennig, Amtmann of Porz, and the officials of Mülheim, appointing Johann von Oemern as the new Vogt (reeve) and customs officer of Mülheim.

Furthermore, on April 21, 1573, Duke Wilhelm appointed Johann Alsueld as procurator at the courts of the Amt of Porz, replacing Caspar Polman. This appointment was made in the presence of Johann von Scheidt genannt Weschpfennig, Amtmann of Porz, and other officials, indicating Johann's active involvement in the administration of justice.

== Personal life ==
Johann married twice. His first marriage, before 1551, was to Elisabeth von Berghe genannt Trips, the widow of Hermann von Fischenich. Elisabeth was the daughter of Johann von Berghe genannt Trips and Magdalena von der Leye. His second marriage, in 1577 or 1578, was to Margaretha von Frankeshoven, the widow of Wilhelm von Blittersdorf. Margaretha was the daughter of Wilhelm von Frankeshoven and Anna Bondtwolff.

== Death and legacy ==
Johann von Scheidt genannt Weschpfennig died in 1585. His contributions to the administrative and judicial systems of the Duchy of Berg, particularly in Porz, are noted in historical records. The von Scheidt genannt Weschpfennig family continued to play significant roles in the region's governance in subsequent generations.
