= Goldscheider =

Goldscheider is a Jewish surname. Notable people with the surname include:

- Alfred Goldscheider (1858–1935), German neurologist
- Friedrich Goldscheider (1845–1897), Bohemia-born Austrian manufacturer of the Goldscheider ceramics
- Ludwig Goldscheider (1896–1973), Austrian-English art historian
- Alexander Goldscheider (born 1950), Czech composer and music producer
- Hans-Günter Goldscheider (born 1944), German neurologist
