= Scheid (surname) =

Scheid (also spelled Scheidt) is a German surname.

Notable people with the surname include:

- Wilhelm von Scheid (c. 1535–1611), Lord of Rötzingshofen from 1596–1611, Imperial count palatine and bailiff for Soling eh, Berg, and Beyerberg
- Bernhard Scheid Austrian historian
- Bruno Scheid (born 1983), Brazilian politician
- Eusébio Scheid (1932–2021), Brazilian Cardinal Priest and Archbishop of Rio de Janeiro
- Linda Scheid (1942–2011), American politician
- Richard Scheid (1876–1962), Bavarian author, unionist, and USPD politician
- Edward Scheidt (born 1939), American cryptographer and ex-Chairman of the CIA Cryptographic Center
- Gottfried Scheidt (1593–1661), German Baroque composer and brother of Samuel Scheidt
- Hans-Wilhelm Scheidt (1907–1981), German Nazi official
- Mike Scheidt, American metal vocalist
- Rafael Scheidt (born 1976), a Brazilian footballer
- Robert Scheidt (born 1973), a Brazilian sailor
- Samuel Scheidt (1587–1654), German Baroque composer and brother of Gottfried Scheidt
- Lords von Scheidt genannt Weschpfennig, a German noble family
