= Horhausen, Rhein-Lahn =

Horhausen
- Municipality
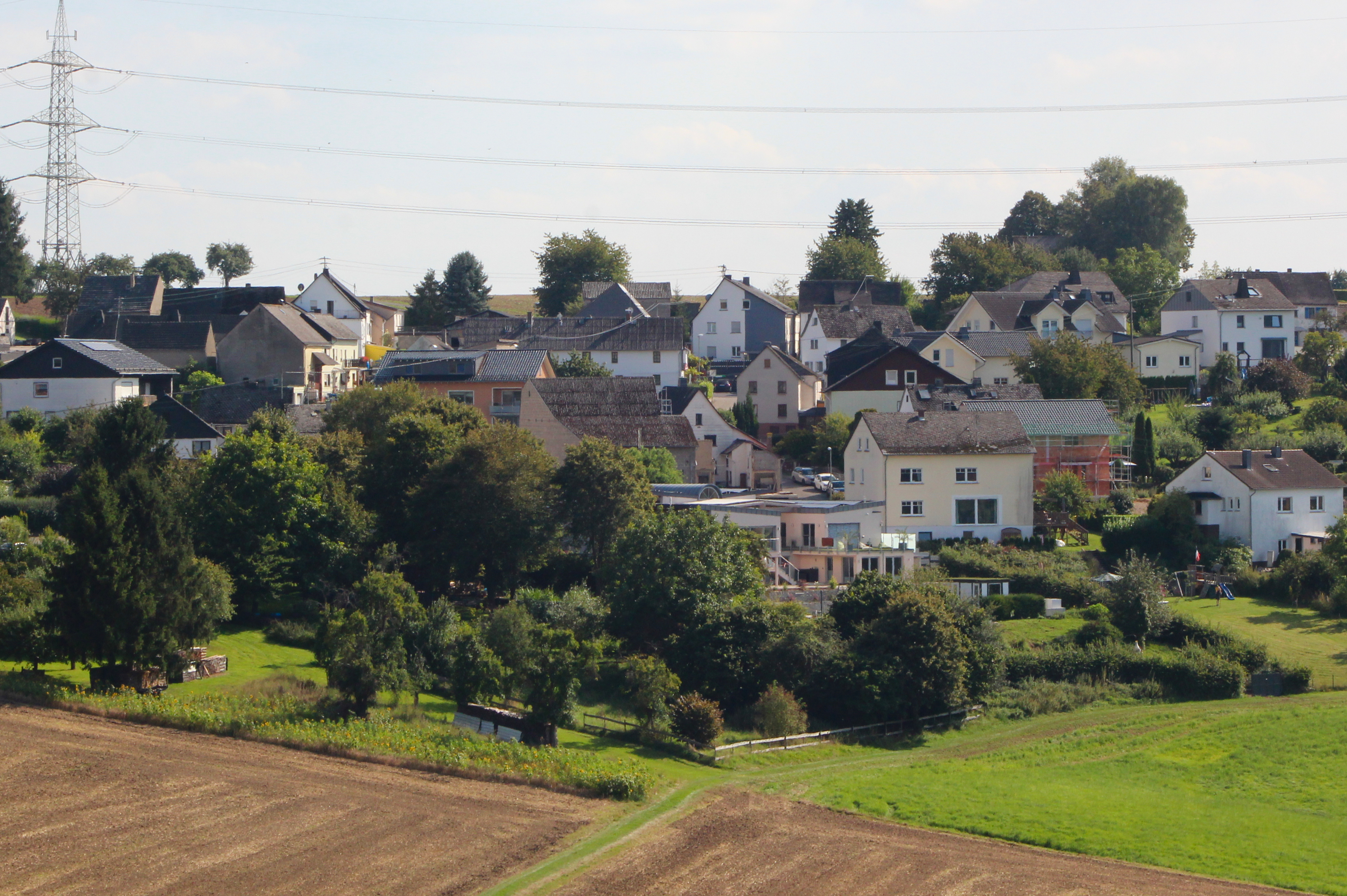

- Coat of arms

- Location of Horhausen within Rhein-Lahn-Kreis district
- Interactive map of Horhausen
- Location within Germany Location within Rhineland-Palatinate
- Coordinates: 50°21′46.44″N 7°53′29.99″E
- Country: Germany
- State: Rhineland-Palatinate
- District: Rhein-Lahn-Kreis
- Municipal assoc.: Diez

Government
  - Mayor (2019–24): Ralf Schmidt

Area
  - Total: 5.46 km^{2} (2.11 sq mi)
- Elevation: 310 m (1,020 ft)

Population (2025-12-31)
  - Total: 304
  - Density: 55.7/km^{2} (144/sq mi)
- Time zone: UTC+01:00 (CET)
  - Summer (DST): UTC+02:00 (CEST)
- Postal codes: 56379
- Dialling codes: 06439
- Vehicle registration: EMS, DIZ, GOH

Horhausen is a municipality in the district of Rhein-Lahn, in Rhineland-Palatinate, in western Germany. It belongs to the association community of Diez.
