= Gückingen =

- Municipality
- Coat of arms

- Location of Gückingen within Rhein-Lahn-Kreis district
- Interactive map of Gückingen
- Location within Germany Location within Rhineland-Palatinate
- Coordinates: 50°23′27.28″N 8°0′26.14″E
- Country: Germany
- State: Rhineland-Palatinate
- District: Rhein-Lahn-Kreis
- Municipal assoc.: Diez
- Subdivisions: 2

Government
  - Mayor (2019–24): Thomas Petri

Area
  - Total: 2.34 km^{2} (0.90 sq mi)
- Elevation: 183 m (600 ft)

Population (2025-12-31)
  - Total: 1,120
  - Density: 479/km^{2} (1,240/sq mi)
- Time zone: UTC+01:00 (CET)
  - Summer (DST): UTC+02:00 (CEST)
- Postal codes: 65558
- Dialling codes: 06432
- Vehicle registration: EMS, DIZ, GOH
- Website: www.gueckingen.de

Gückingen (German pronunciation: [ˈɡʏkɪŋən]) is a municipality in the district of Rhein-Lahn, in Rhineland-Palatinate, in western Germany. It belongs to the association community of Diez.

== Transport ==
Local bus lines 450 and 575 connect the village to public transport. It is located in zone number 520 of the transport association Verkehrsverbund Rhein-Mosel (VRM).
