= Scheidler =

Scheidler is a surname of German-language origin. Notable people with the name include:

- Aurélien Scheidler (born 1998), French footballer
- Christian Gottlieb Scheidler (1747–1829), German musician and composer
- Fabian Scheidler (born 1968), German author and playwright
- Joseph M. Scheidler (1927–2021), American anti-abortion activist
- Karl Hermann Scheidler (1795–1866), German philosopher and political scientist
- Monika Scheidler (born 1962), German Catholic theologian
- Penelope Scheidler (born 1996), Austrian circus artist and dancer
- Renate Scheidler (born 1960), German and Canadian mathematician
