= Dreisbach (surname) =

Dreisbach is a surname. Notable people with the surname include:

- Anne Dreisbach, Baptist missionary
- Daniel Dreisbach, American author, academic, and attorney
- Fritz Dreisbach (born 1941), American artist and teacher
- Scott Dreisbach (born 1975), American football quarterback
