= Scheidel =

Scheidel is a surname. Notable people with the surname include:

- Walter Scheidel (born 1966), Austrian historian
- Wolfgang Scheidel (born 1943), German luger
- Valentin Scheidel (1883–?), German physicist
