= Dreisbach (Sieg) =

River in Germany

Location
- Country: Germany
- State: North Rhine-Westphalia

Physical characteristics
- Mouth
  - location: Sieg
  - coordinates: 50.9120°N 8.0383°E
- Length: 14.3 km (8.9 mi)

Basin features
- Progression: Sieg→ Rhine→ North Sea

Dreisbach is a river of North Rhine-Westphalia, Germany. It is a right tributary of the Sieg.

== See also ==
- List of rivers of North Rhine-Westphalia
