= Geilnau =

- Municipality
- Coat of arms

- Location of Geilnau within Rhein-Lahn-Kreis district
- Interactive map of Geilnau
- Location within Germany Location within Rhineland-Palatinate
- Coordinates: 50°20′58″N 7°55′38″E
- Country: Germany
- State: Rhineland-Palatinate
- District: Rhein-Lahn-Kreis
- Municipal assoc.: Diez

Government
  - Mayor (2019–24): Friedhelm Rücker

Area
  - Total: 2.24 km^{2} (0.86 sq mi)
- Elevation: 98 m (322 ft)

Population (2025-12-31)
  - Total: 354
  - Density: 158/km^{2} (409/sq mi)
- Time zone: UTC+01:00 (CET)
  - Summer (DST): UTC+02:00 (CEST)
- Postal codes: 56379
- Dialling codes: 06439
- Vehicle registration: EMS, DIZ, GOH
- Website: www.geilnau.de

Geilnau (German pronunciation: [ˈɡaɪlnaʊ]) is a municipality in the district of Rhein-Lahn, in Rhineland-Palatinate, in western Germany. It belongs to the association community of Diez.
