= House Bilkrath =

Medieval house in Duisburg, Germany

Coordinates: 51°20′03″N 6°46′17″E

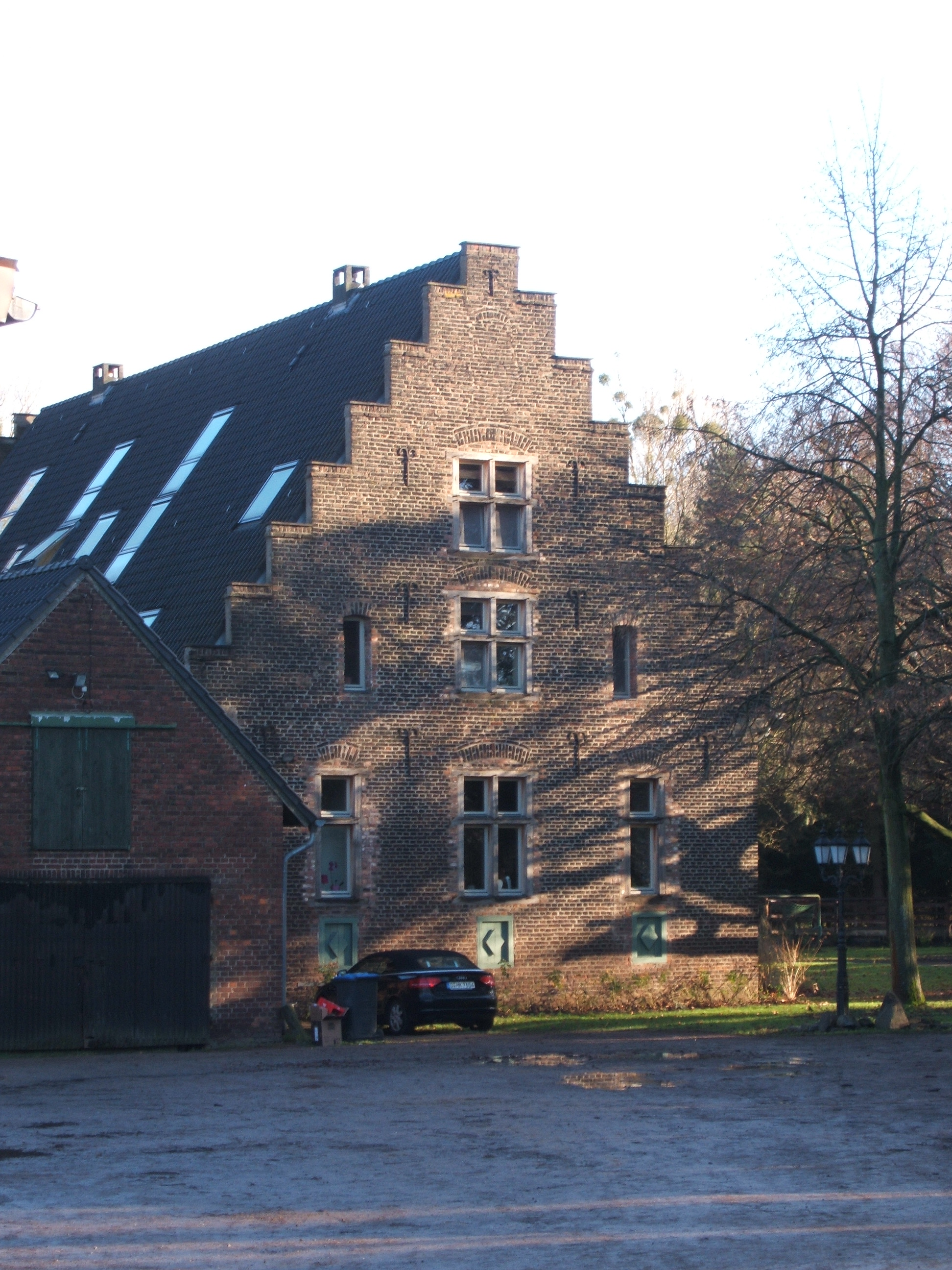
Haus Bilkrath in Düsseldorf-Angermund

House Bilkrath (German: Haus Bilkrath, Old German: Hof Pilkrath) is a medieval fortified house on the Anger in the Düsseldorf district of Angermund, just a few hundred meters south of Heltorf Castle.

== History ==
Bilkrath appears as early as 1332 as Pelichrad,1402 as Peylcheroyde and 1407 as Peillichrade. The suffix -rath, -royde or -rade indicates that the house was built on cleared land. The name stem is traced back to the personal name Billig.

The 1402 source shows that the lords of Kalkum were the owners of Bilkrath towards the end of the 14th century. For example, Johann von Caelchem von Peylcheroyde, who was executed by the city of Cologne a long time ago in 1402 and whose execution was one of the triggers of the Kalkum feuds, is mentioned. Prior to this, Johann's (great) grandfather Hermann von Kalkum, bailiff of Angermund, is said to have had his residence in Bilkrath as early as 1312.

In the first half of the 15th century, Gerhard van der Brüggen, judge in Angermund, was the Duke's master chef and married Steyngen vom Angeren, Lord of Pilckrath. In 1443, the estate was then owned by the knight Wilhelm von Landsberg gt. Eggerscheidt and his son-in-law Dietrich von Aschenberg, who may have sold the estate to the knight Ailff Quade, bailiff of Angermund. The former moated castle was subsequently owned by the Quadt family for many years.

In 1559, Bilkrath was surveyed by Hermann Brinck, a citizen of Uerdingen. The entire estate comprised 156 acres of land. The main field was in the large field near the farm. Other lands were located on Kalkstraße, Kirchweg, next to Kalkumer Kirchland and Dickenbusch.

In 1596, Konrad Quadt sold the estate for 5,000 köllnisch thalers (settled at 52 albus köllnisch each) to Wilhelm von Scheid called Weschpfennig zu Heltorf, count palatine and bailiff of the Solingen, Burg, and the Beyenburg office. Since this time, Bilkrath has had the same owners as Heltorf, i.e. after the Lords of Scheidt called Weschpfennig until today the Lords/Counts of Spee.

In the last centuries, Bilkrath was leased out except for short periods in between. In 1631 the farm was leased to a Theis (Matthias).

In 1766, Bilkrath went to Johann Peter Thielen for twelve years, and in 1778 to Heligerus Huntgeburth and Maria Katharina Schmitz, also for 12 years. In 1791, the lease was extended for the couple for a further 12 years. The Huntgeburth descendants ran the farm until 1932, after which the Klünter family lived on the farm. Since 2006, the Köppel family has been running a riding stable in Bilkrath with 30 horse boxes, two outdoor riding arenas and an indoor exercise arena.

The house has been protected as a listed building since 1 October 1990.
