= Scheidt, Rhineland-Palatinate =

Scheidt
- Municipality
- Coat of arms

- Location of Scheidt within Rhein-Lahn-Kreis district
- Interactive map of Scheidt
- Location within Germany Location within Rhineland-Palatinate
- Coordinates: 50°20′19″N 7°54′51″E
- Country: Germany
- State: Rhineland-Palatinate
- District: Rhein-Lahn-Kreis
- Municipal assoc.: Diez

Government
  - Mayor (2019–24): Hans-Wilhelm Lippert

Area
  - Total: 2.51 km^{2} (0.97 sq mi)
- Elevation: 245 m (804 ft)

Population (2025-12-31)
  - Total: 363
  - Density: 145/km^{2} (375/sq mi)
- Time zone: UTC+01:00 (CET)
  - Summer (DST): UTC+02:00 (CEST)
- Postal codes: 56379
- Dialling codes: 06439
- Vehicle registration: EMS, DIZ, GOH

Scheidt (German pronunciation: [ʃaɪt]) is a municipality in the municipal association of Diez in the district of Rhein-Lahn, in Rhineland-Palatinate, in western Germany.

== History ==
Although the first written mention of the noble family name "von Scheyde", from Scheyde, goes back to the year 1348, the first mention of the town itself does not appear until 1364. However, it is believed that there were settlements here during the construction of Laurenburg Castle in the 11th century. In the mid-17th century it became part of the County of Holzappel. In 1806, Scheidt became part of the Duchy of Nassau in Diez Office, which was annexed by Prussia in 1866. Since 1946 it has been part of Rhineland-Palatinate.

== Religious life ==
Scheidt is part of the Roman Catholic parish of St. Boniface in Holzappel. The parish belongs to the Diez Pastoral Area of the Limburg district in the Diocese of Limburg.

The Protestant community is part of Holzappel parish, which belongs to the Diez Deanery of the South Nassau Provostship of the Evangelical Church in Hesse and Nassau (EKHN).
