= Imperial count palatine =

An imperial count palatine (Latin: comes palatinus caesareus, German: Kaiserlicher Hofpfalzgraf) was an official in the Holy Roman Empire with quasi-monarchical ("palatine") powers. In all, over 5,000 imperial counts palatine were created between the 14th and 18th centuries. The office was hereditary in perpetuity in the legitimate male line.

== History ==
The office originated in the Lombard kingdom in Italy (c.575–774), where the kings appointed officials with the title comes palatii (count of the palace) and power to act in the king's absence. The office was retained in Italy under the Carolingians after 774 and under the Ottonians after 961. The Emperor Otto III is known to have appointed a large number of counts palatine.

The title for a count palatine gradually grew in length, from comes sacri palatii (count of the sacred palace) to comes sacri Lateranensis palatii (count of the sacred Lateran palace) to comes palatinus sacri Lateranensis palatii (count palatine of the sacred Lateran palace). The connection to the actual Lateran Palace in Rome was merely symbolic. The Lateran was a former imperial palace under the Roman Empire and was the chief residence of the Popes in the Middle Ages. Its use in the title of a count palatine underlined his imperial and universal commission. This could occasionally be explicit, as in Benedetto Porcellini's title in a 1519 notarial act: comes palatinus et sacri Lateranensis palatii apostolicis et imperialis (count palatine of the sacred Lateran apostolic and imperial palace).

The office of imperial count palatine was hereditary and the emperors seem to have used it to create an Italian aristocratic class loyal to the empire. In 1357, the Emperor Charles IV added the power of conferring licences and doctorates of civil law to those of the counts palatine. Later on, they acquired the power to confer doctorates in general.

== Role ==
In some cases where parties willingly submitted their petitions to them, the imperial count palatine possessed jurisdictional authority (comitiva) to settle the matter. Such cases included: the legitimizing children born out of wedlock; appointing guardians for minors; confirming that a minor had come of age; certifying adoptions; attesting documents such as wills; authorizing patents of nobility and coats of arms; conferring academic honors such as doctorates; appointing of notaries public and judges; and laureating poets.

The procedure for receiving a doctorate from a count palatine was less onerous and, since it involved fewer people that needed paying, less expensive than receiving a doctorate from a university. A doctorate from a Counts Palatine also generally required fewer years of study, with the examination simpler and the ceremony of conferral less solemn. In Italy, Protestants and Jews preferred to receive their degrees from counts because counts did not require an oath of allegiance to the Catholic Church.

While the emperor appointed imperial counts palatine for individual territories, from time to time the territorial princes themselves would bestow this honor with comitiva major (German Großes Palatinat), that is with the power to transact these enactments on their own initiative.

The appointment as an imperial count palatine was a lucrative post, because the office bearer could levy fees for the execution of official acts.

The imperial count palatine gradually lost its importance, and the office ended with the dissolution of the Holy Roman Empire in 1806.
