= Ruppichteroth =

- Town
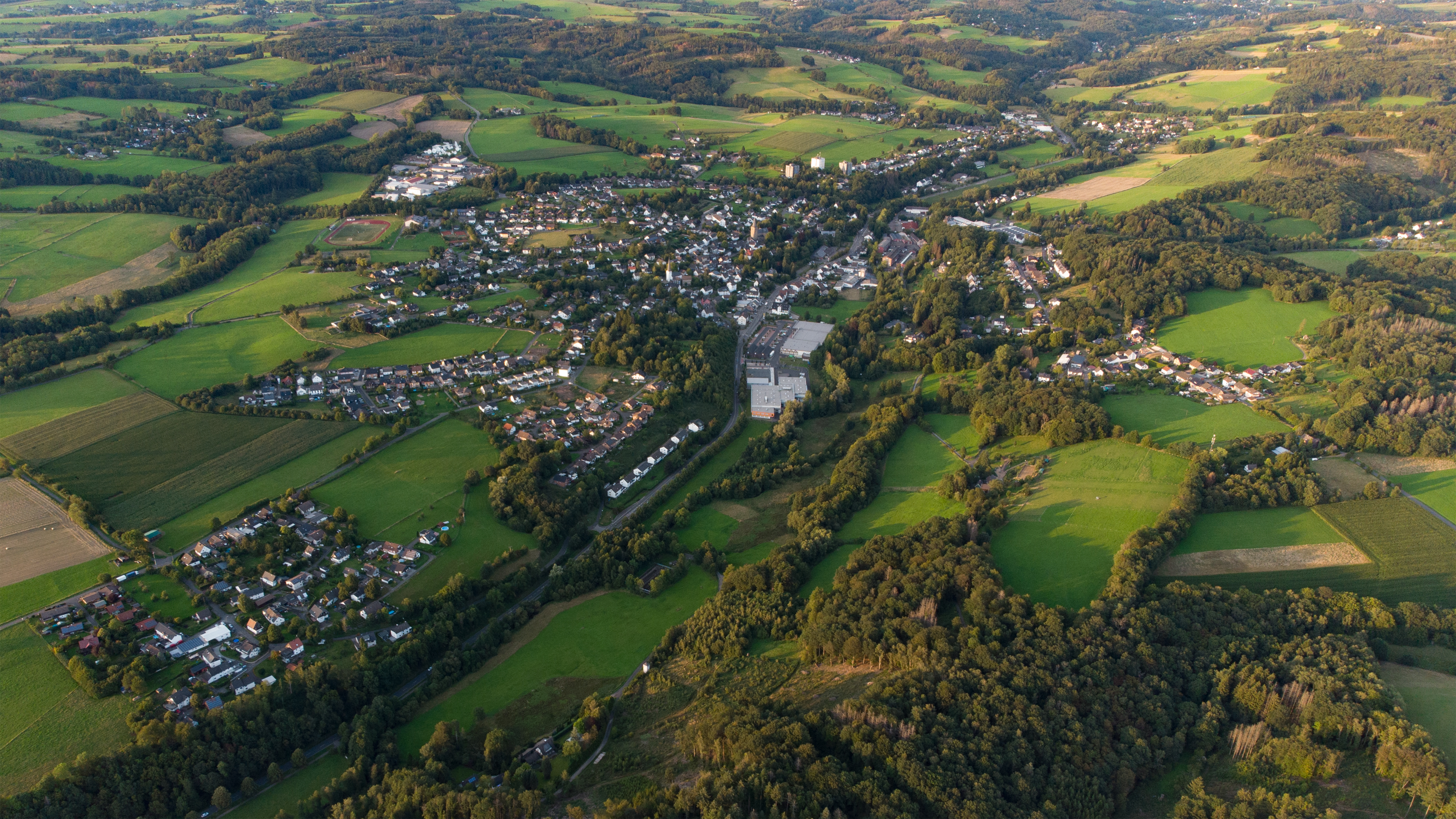
- Aerial view

- Coat of arms

- Location of Ruppichteroth within Rhein-Sieg-Kreis district
- Interactive map of Ruppichteroth
- Location within Germany Location within North Rhine-Westphalia
- Coordinates: 50°50′38″N 7°29′01″E
- Country: Germany
- State: North Rhine-Westphalia
- Admin. region: Köln
- District: Rhein-Sieg-Kreis
- Subdivisions: 3

Government
  - Mayor (2020–25): Mario Loskill

Area
  - Total: 61.95 km^{2} (23.92 sq mi)
- Elevation: 80–361 m (262–1,184 ft)

Population (2025-12-31)
  - Total: 10,777
  - Density: 174.0/km^{2} (450.6/sq mi)
- Time zone: UTC+01:00 (CET)
  - Summer (DST): UTC+02:00 (CEST)
- Postal codes: 53809
- Dialling codes: 02295, 02247
- Vehicle registration: SU
- Website: www.ruppichteroth.de

Ruppichteroth is a municipality in the Rhein-Sieg district, in the southern part of North Rhine-Westphalia, Germany. It is located approximately 30 kilometers east of Bonn.

== Districts ==
In 1969, the old municipality of Winterscheid became part of Ruppichteroth. Since then the municipality consists of three districts:

- Ruppichteroth
- Schönenberg
- Winterscheid

== History ==
Ruppichteroth was first mentioned in 843.

== Population ==
Historical population

Year	Pop.	±% p.a.
1965	6,270	—
1970	6,705	+1.35%
1975	7,287	+1.68%
1980	7,591	+0.82%
1985	7,784	+0.50%
1990	8,382	+1.49%
1995	9,484	+2.50%

Year	Pop.	±% p.a.
2000	10,127	+1.32%
2005	10,775	+1.25%
2010	10,631	−0.27%
2015	10,461	−0.32%
2020	10,484	+0.04%
2025	10,777	+0.55%

Source: Landesdatabank Nordrhein-Westfalen

== Twin towns ==
- Longdendale, United Kingdom
- Caputh, Germany
- Schenkendöbern, Germany
