= Bröl =

River in Germany

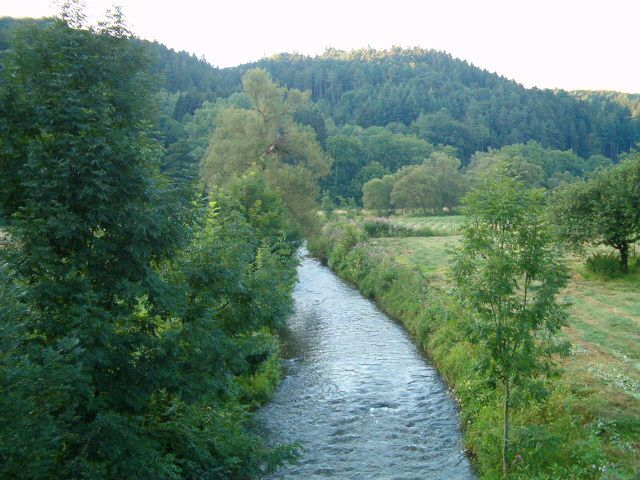
- The Bröl in Hennef, just before it flows into the Sieg

Location
- Country: Germany
- State: North Rhine-Westphalia

Physical characteristics
- Source
  - elevation: 368 m (1,207 ft)
- Mouth
  - location: in Hennef
  - coordinates: 50°46′56″N 7°18′30″E
  - elevation: 67 m (220 ft)
- Length: 45.1 km (28.0 mi)
- Basin size: 217.2 km^{2} (83.9 sq mi)

Basin features
- Progression: Sieg→ Rhine→ North Sea

The Bröl (also called the Brölbach or the Homburgische Bröl) is a 45.1 km long right tributary of the Sieg in North Rhine-Westphalia, Germany.

The river flows through the districts of Rhein-Sieg-Kreis and Oberbergischer Kreis. The river's source is in the town of Waldbröl at an elevation of 368 meters above sea level. It flows in a southwest direction through the Bergisches Land and past the Homburg Castle. In the town of Ruppichteroth, a small tributary called the Waldbrölbach joins the Bröl. It eventually flows to the town of Hennef where it joins the Sieg at an elevation of 67 meters.
