= Koblenz =

Place in Rhineland-Palatinate, Germany

Koblenz Kowelenz (Moselle Franconian)
- City
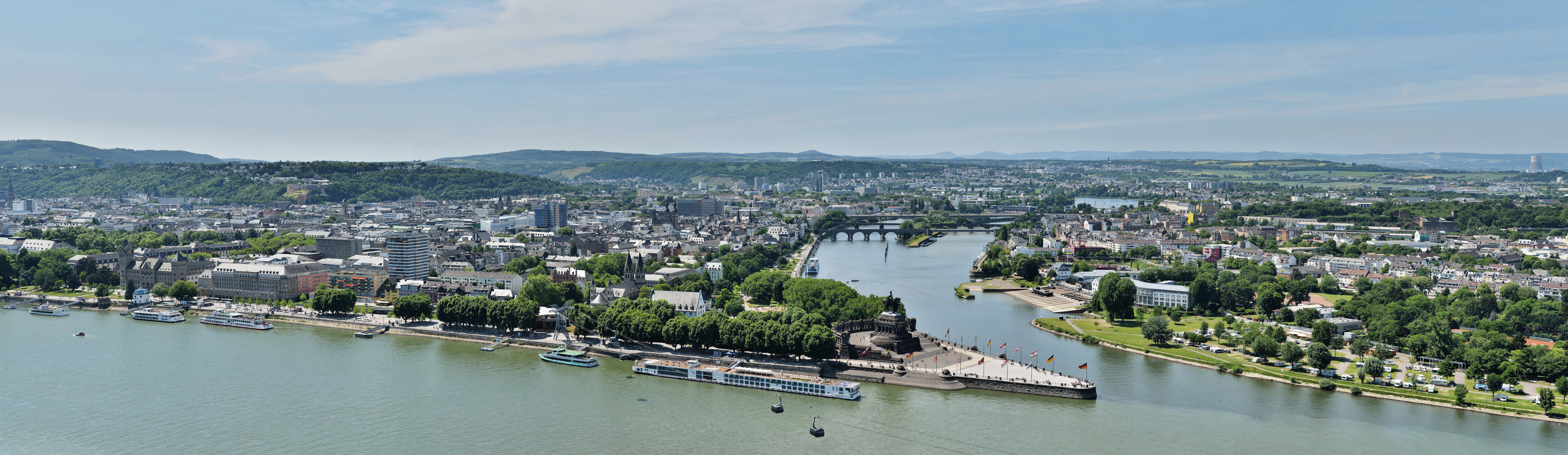
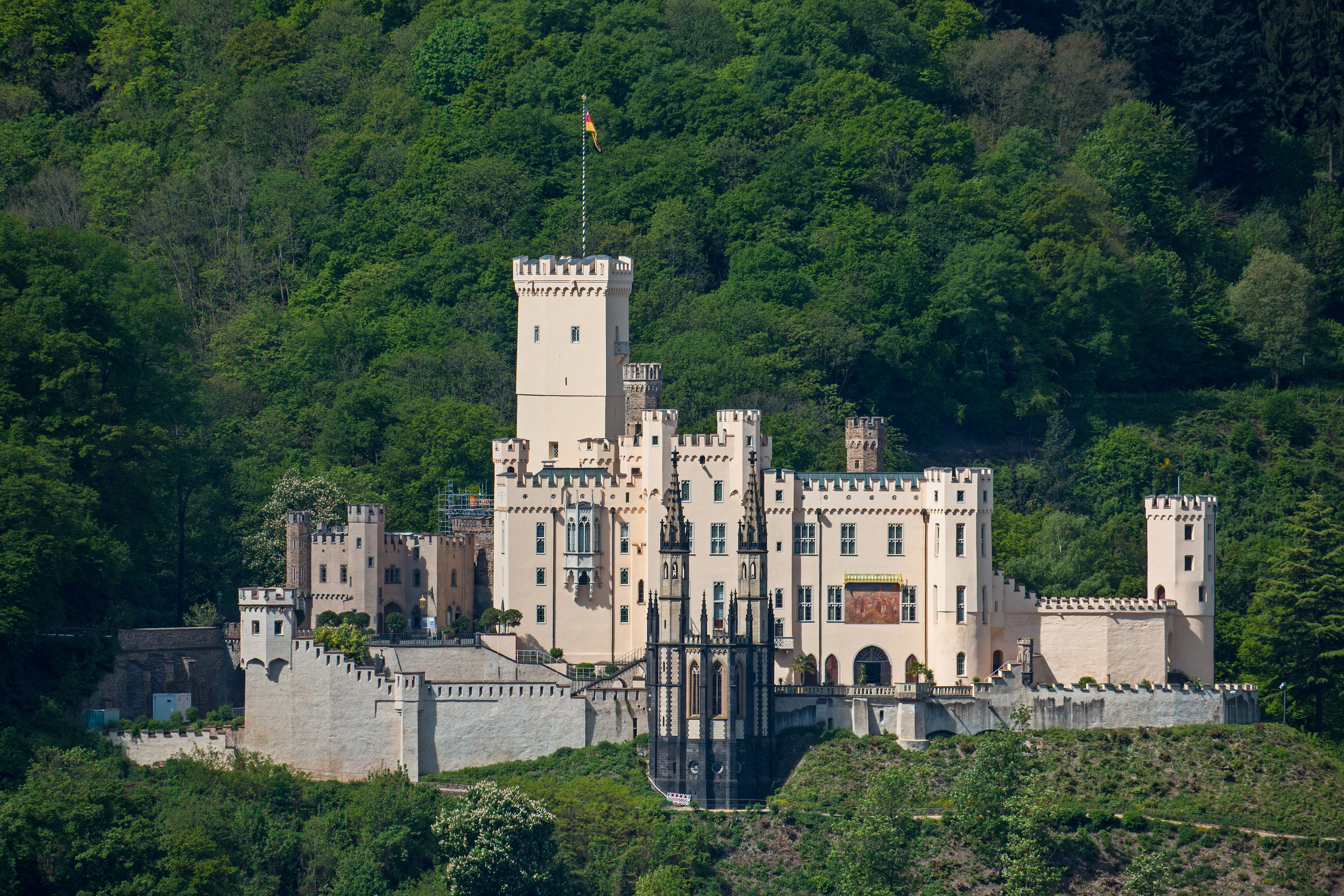
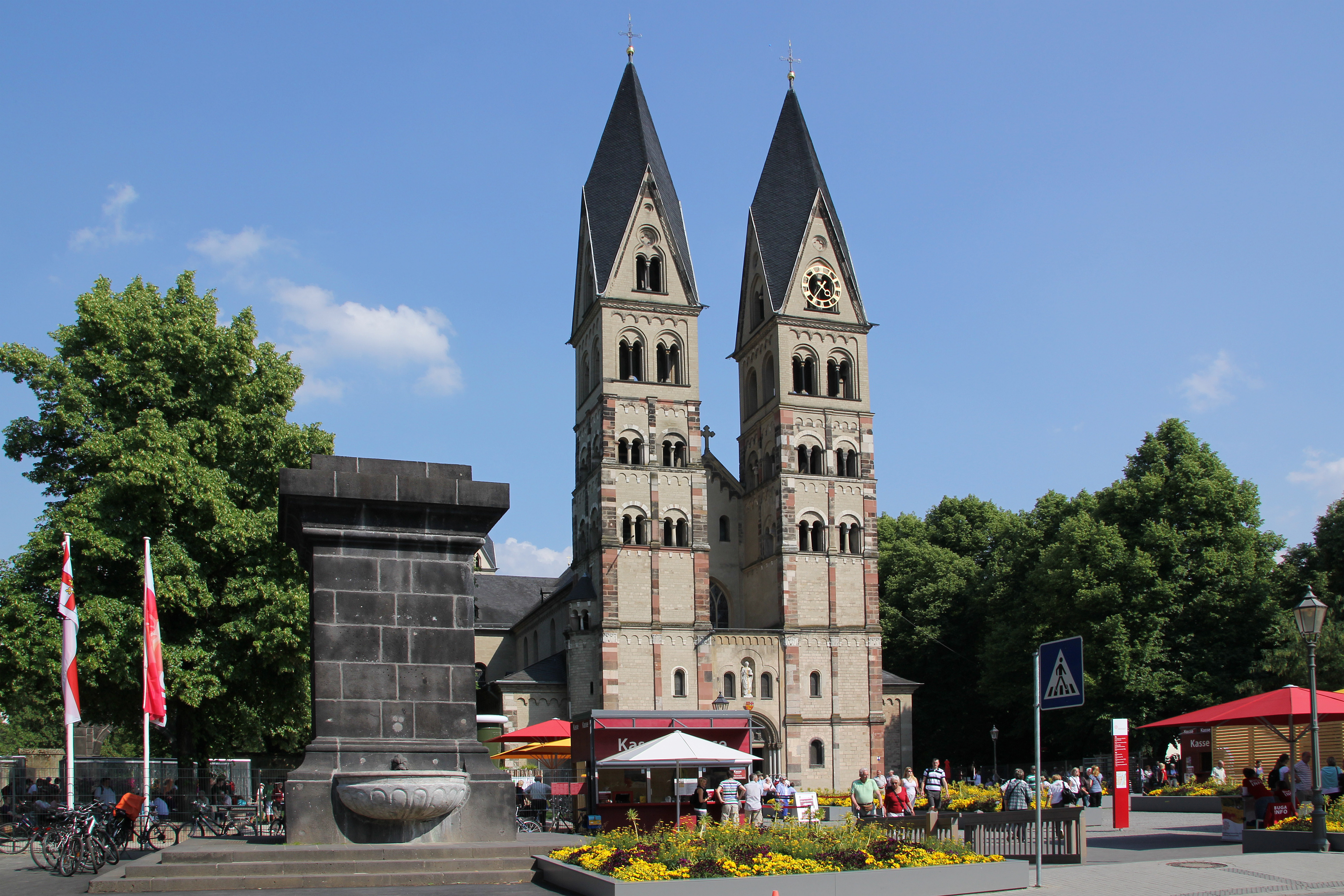
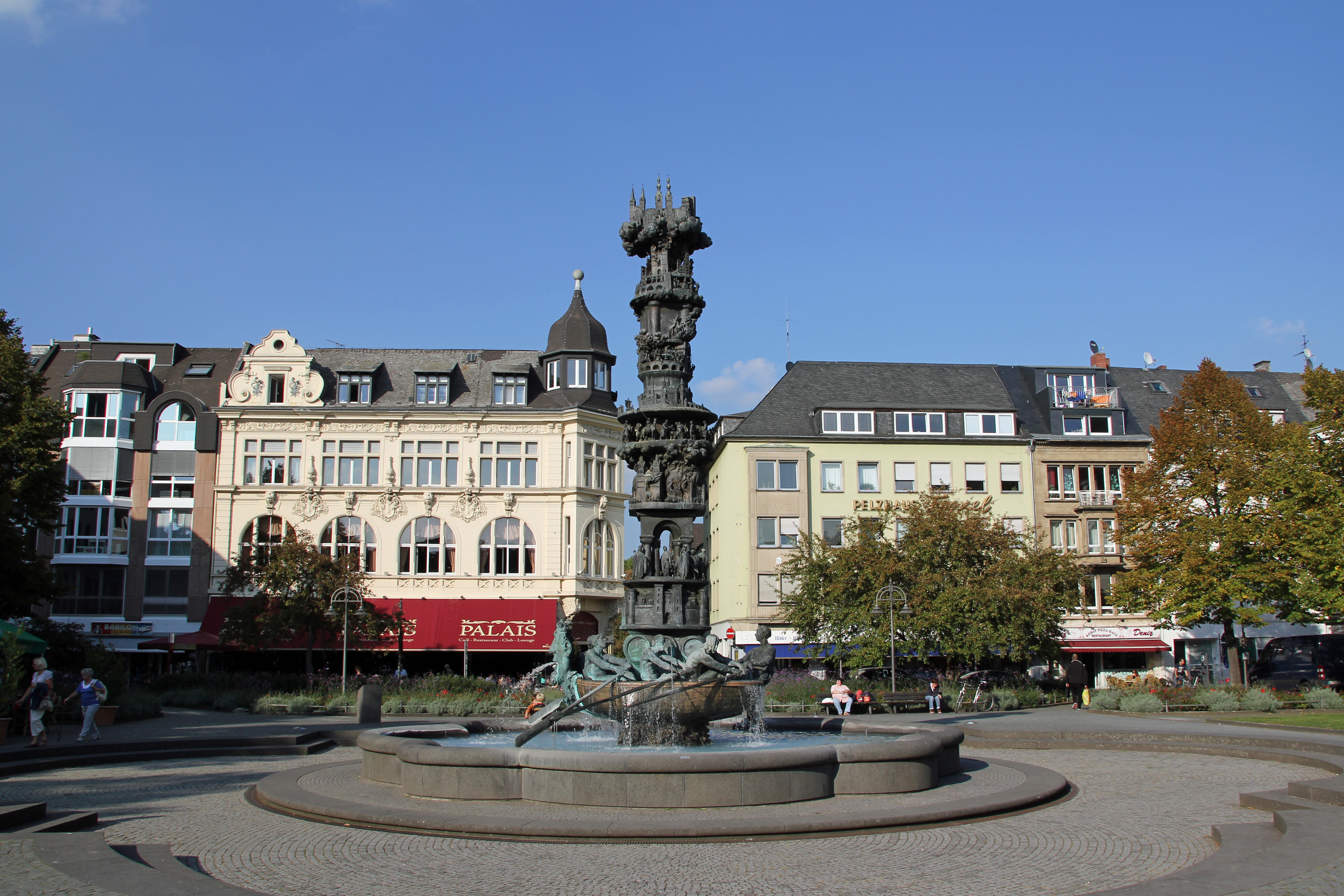
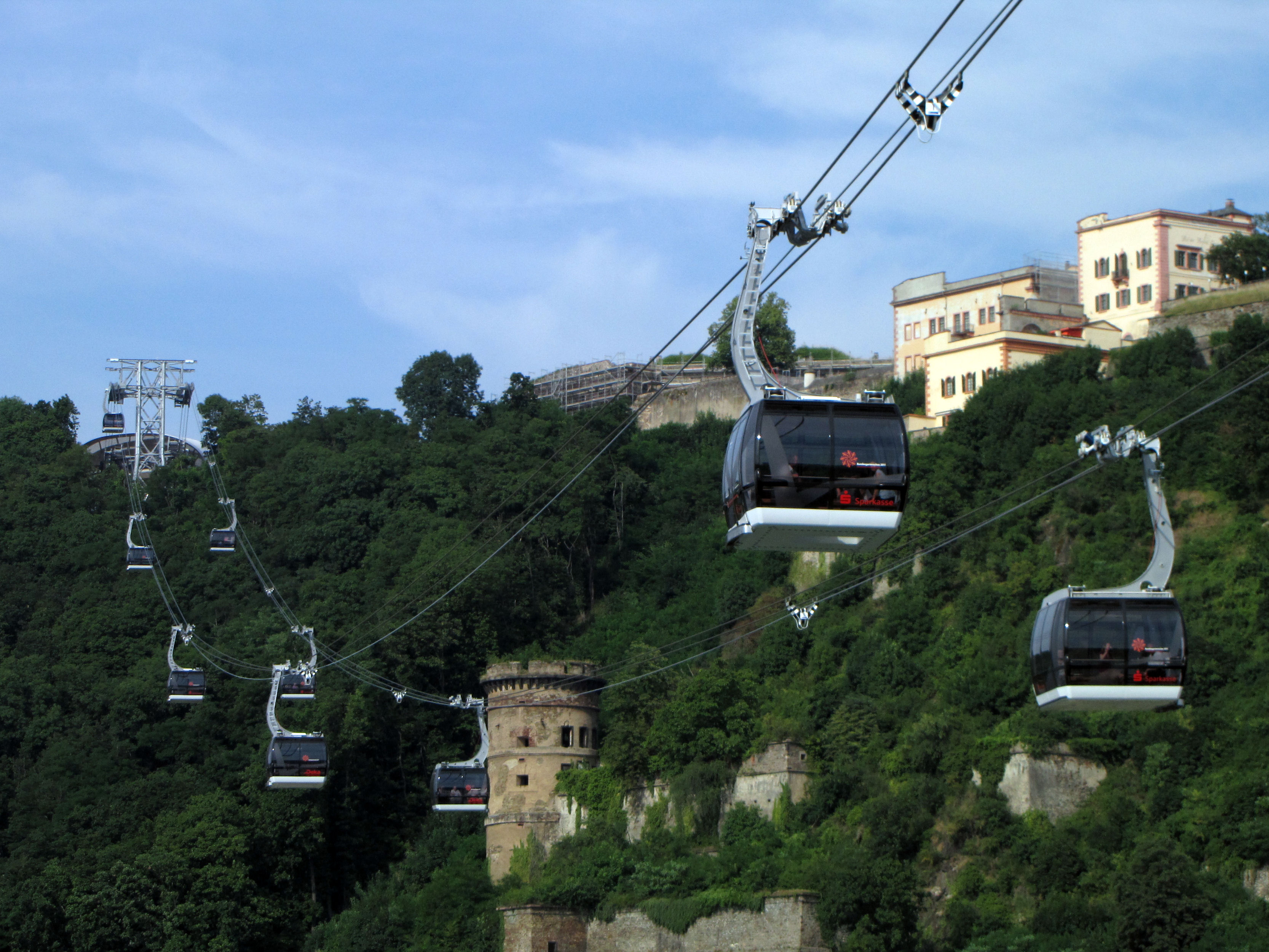
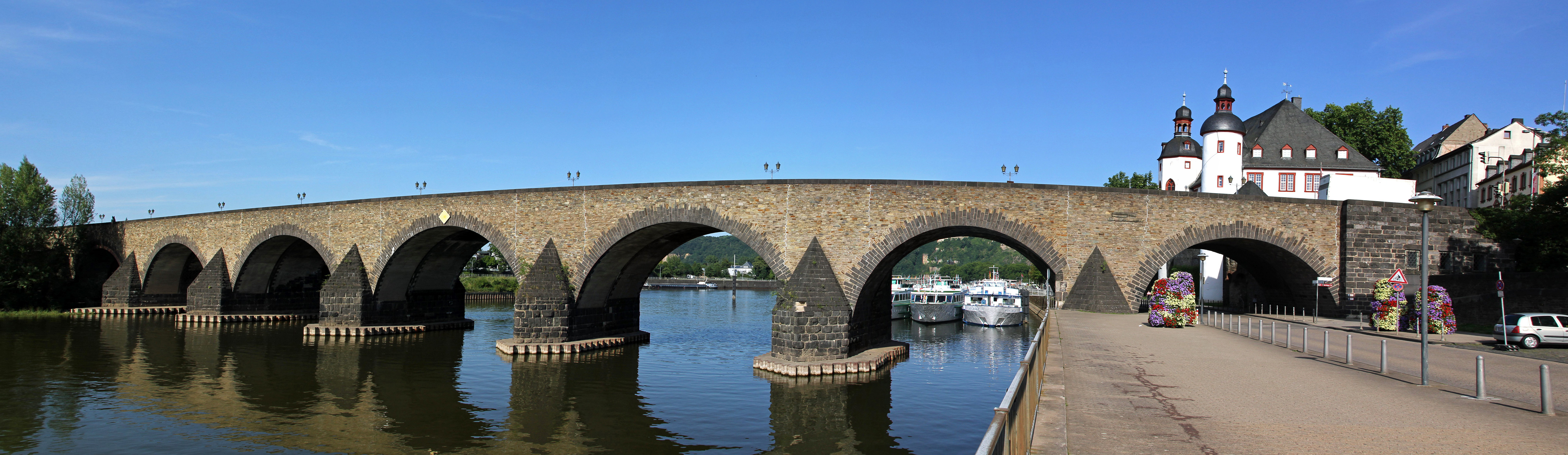
- Deutsches Eck and Koblenz Old Town Stolzenfels Castle Basilica of Saint Castor Fountain "Historiensäule" Koblenz cable car Baldwin Bridge

- Flag Coat of arms

- Location of Koblenz in Rhineland-Palatinate
- Interactive map of Koblenz
- Location within Germany Location within Rhineland-Palatinate
- Coordinates: 50°21′35″N 7°35′52″E
- Country: Germany
- State: Rhineland-Palatinate
- District: Urban district

Government
  - Mayor (2017–25): David Langner (Ind.)

Area
  - Total: 105.25 km^{2} (40.64 sq mi)
- Elevation: 64.7 m (212 ft)

Population (2025-12-31)
  - Total: 113,020
  - Density: 1,073.8/km^{2} (2,781.2/sq mi)
- Time zone: UTC+01:00 (CET)
  - Summer (DST): UTC+02:00 (CEST)
- Postal codes: 56001–56077
- Dialling codes: 0261
- Vehicle registration: KO
- Website: koblenz.de

Koblenz (UK: /koʊˈblɛnts/ koh-BLENTS, US: /ˈkoʊblɛnts/ KOH-blents; German: [ˈkoːblɛnts]; Moselle Franconian: Kowelenz) is a city in the German state of Rhineland-Palatinate, on the banks of the rivers Rhine (Middle Rhine) and Moselle, a multinational tributary.

Koblenz was established as a Roman military post by Drusus c. 8 BC. Its name originates from the Latin (ad) cōnfluentēs, meaning "(at the) confluence". The actual confluence is today known as the "German Corner", a symbol of the unification of Germany that features an equestrian statue of Emperor William I. The city celebrated its 2,000th anniversary in 1992.

The city ranks as the third-largest city by population in Rhineland-Palatinate, behind Mainz and Ludwigshafen am Rhein, with 115,298 residents (as of 2023). Koblenz lies in a narrow flood plain between high hill ranges, some reaching mountainous height, and is served by an express rail and autobahn network. It is part of the populous Rhineland.

== Name ==
Historic spellings include Covelenz, Coblenz, and Cobelenz. In local dialect the name is as the first historic spelling indicates, in German orthography, Latscho Kowelenz.

== History ==
Historical population
Year	Pop.	±%
1469	1,193	—
1663	1,409	+18.1%
1800	7,992	+467.2%
1836	13,307	+66.5%
1871	24,902	+87.1%
1900	45,147	+81.3%
1910	56,487	+25.1%
1919	56,676	+0.3%
1925	58,161	+2.6%
1933	65,257	+12.2%
1939	91,098	+39.6%
1950	66,444	−27.1%
1961	99,240	+49.4%
1970	101,374	+2.2%
1987	108,246	+6.8%
2011	107,825	−0.4%
2018	114,024	+5.7%
Population size may be affected by changes in administrative divisions. source:

=== Ancient era ===
Around 1000 BC, early fortifications were erected on the Festung Ehrenbreitstein hill on the opposite side of the Rhine. In 55 BC, Roman troops commanded by Julius Caesar reached the Rhine and built a bridge between Koblenz and Andernach. About 9 BC, the Castellum apud Confluentes was one of the military posts established by Drusus.

Remains of a large bridge built in 49 AD by the Romans are still visible. The Romans built two forts as protection for the bridge, one in 9 AD and another in the 2nd century, the latter being destroyed by the Franks in 259. North of Koblenz was a temple of Mercury and Rosmerta (a Gallo-Roman deity), which remained in use up to the 5th century.

=== Middle Ages ===
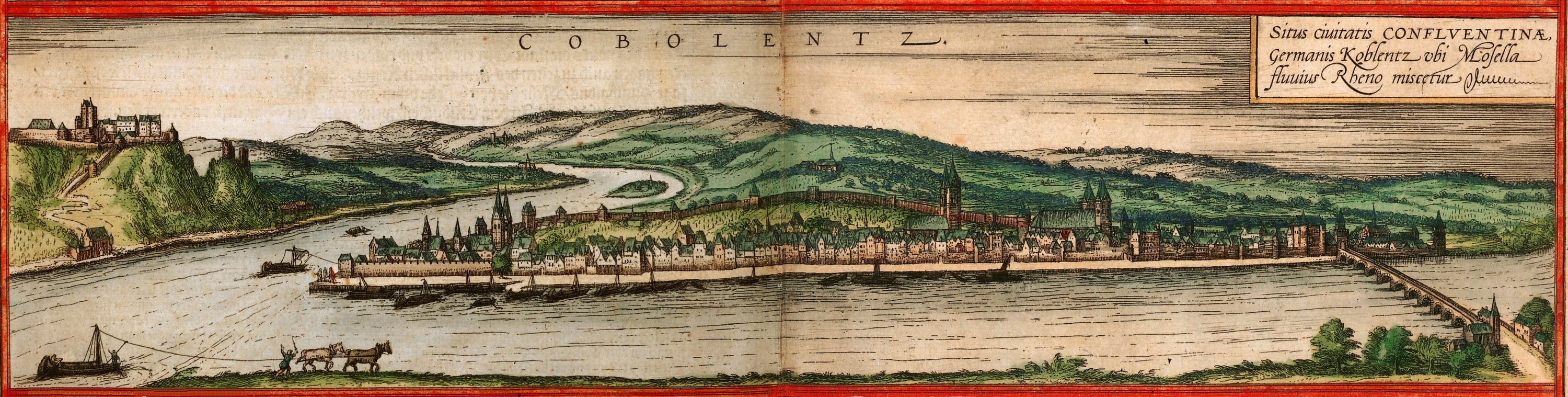
Koblenz in the 16th century

With the fall of the Western Roman Empire, the city was conquered by the Franks and became a royal seat. After the division of Charlemagne's empire, it was included in the lands of his son Louis the Pious (814). In 837, it was assigned to Charles the Bald, and a few years later it was here that Carolingian heirs discussed what was to become the Treaty of Verdun (843), by which the city became part of Lotharingia under Lothair I. In 860 and 922, Koblenz was the scene of ecclesiastical synods. At the first synod, held in the Liebfrauenkirche, the reconciliation of Louis the German with his half-brother Charles the Bald took place. In the second, slavery was condemned, specifically, it was decreed that any man who "led away a Christian man and then sold him" should be considered guilty of homicide. The city was sacked and destroyed by the Norsemen in 882. In 925, it became part of the eastern German Kingdom, later the Holy Roman Empire.

In 1018, the city was given by the emperor Henry II to the archbishop-elector of Trier after receiving a charter. It remained in the possession of his successors until the end of the 18th century, having been their main residence since the 17th century. Emperor Conrad II was elected here in 1138. In 1198, the battle between Philip of Swabia and Otto IV took place nearby. In 1216, prince-bishop Theoderich von Wied donated part of the lands of the basilica and the hospital to the Teutonic Knights, which later became the Deutsches Eck.

In 1249–1254, Koblenz was given new walls by Archbishop Arnold II of Isenburg; and it was partly to overawe the turbulent citizens that successive archbishops built and strengthened the fortress of Ehrenbreitstein that still dominates the city.

=== French Revolution ===
==== Home of Royalist émigrés ====
When the French Revolution broke out, Koblenz became a popular hub of royalist émigrés and escaping feudal lords who had fled France. It was sometime in mid-1791, after June but before October, that supporters of loyalty in Koblenz (as well as Worms and Brussels) were preparing an invasion of France that was to be supported by foreign armies, with conspirators regularly travelling between Koblenz and Tuileries Palace, accepting encouragement and money from King Louis XVI, while secret committees were collecting arms and enrolling men and officers. Among the notable émigrés living at Koblenz were Charles, Count of Artois, (future Charles X), ex-minister Charles Alexandre de Calonne, and Louis, Count of Provence (future Louis XVIII). Officers and men were recruited through the Gazette de Paris (sixty livres for each recruit), and the enrolled men were then sent to Metz and afterwards to Koblenz, and in a visit by Claude Allier to Koblenz in January 1792, he stated that 60,000 men were armed and ready to take action.

==== Near destruction by Royalist forces ====
On 26 July 1792, the Duke of Brunswick, who commanded one of the invading armies, composed of 70,000 Prussians and 68,000 Austrians, Hessians and émigrés, began to march upon Koblenz. He published a manifesto in which he threatened to set fire to the towns that dared to defend themselves, and to exterminate their inhabitants as rebels, including Koblenz. The city's fate was at hand. But, just as in World War 1, the torrential rains and difficult conditions of the Argonne forest halted the invaders, the roads "were liquid mud," and supplies began to run out due to weather impacting supply lines. The radical revolutionary Georges Danton negotiated with the Duke of Brunswick, under unknown conditions, for his retreat, which was carried out through Grand-Pré and Verdun, then across the Rhine, and the city of Koblenz was saved.

==== Participation in the Vendee uprising ====
In 1793, the uprising of Catholic peasants at the Vendée aimed at the overthrow of the National Assembly, which began only after emissaries from Koblenz travelled there, bringing papal bulls, royal decrees and gold. In escaping the watchful eye of French revolutionary forces, these emissaries were aided and protected by the middle classes, the ex-slave-traders of Nantes, and the anti-sans-culottes, pro-England merchants.

==== Overall influence ====
Due to their experience in the French Revolution, Peter Kropotkin had termed the phrase Koblenzian to describe the type of royalist émigrés that lived in Koblenz.

=== Modern era ===
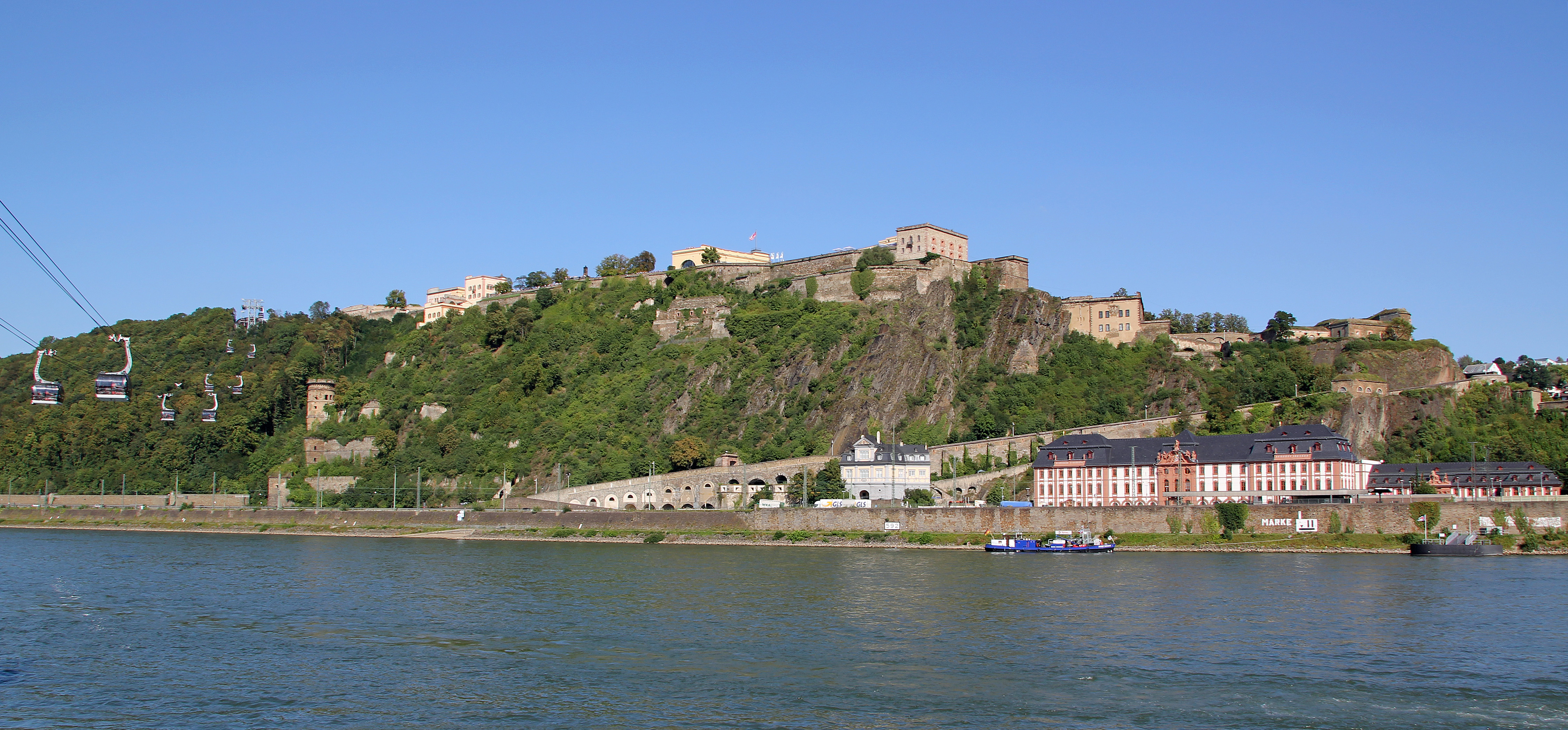
Ehrenbreitstein Fortress as seen from Koblenz

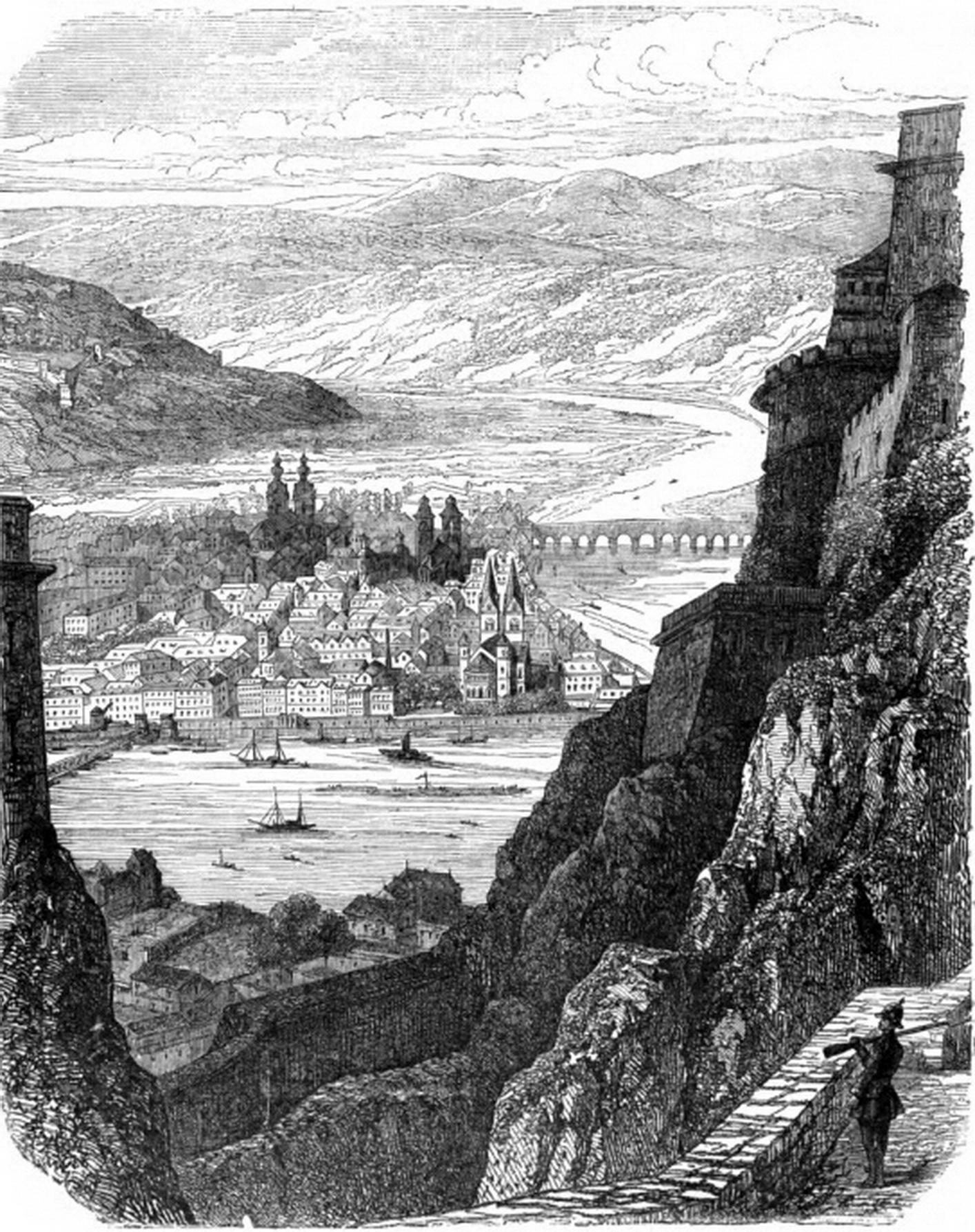
View of Coblence near 1860

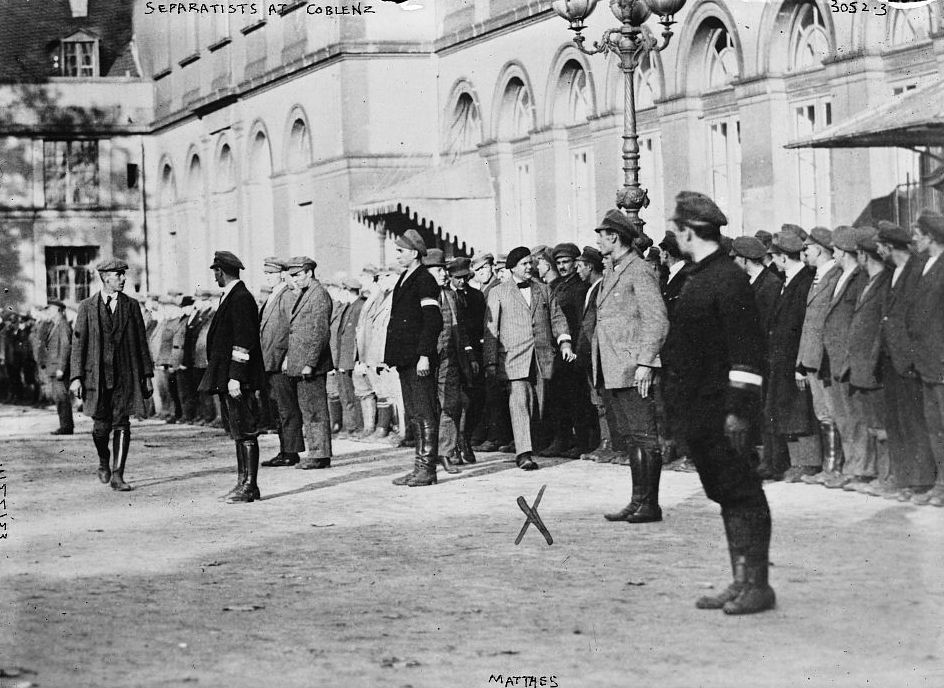
Josef Friedrich Matthes in 1923 in Koblenz during the short-lived Rhenish Republic

The city was a member of the league of the Rhenish cities, which rose in the 13th century. The Teutonic Knights founded the Bailiwick of Koblenz in or around 1231. Koblenz attained great prosperity and it continued to advance until the disaster of the Thirty Years' War brought about a rapid decline. After Philip Christopher, elector of Trier, surrendered Ehrenbreitstein to the French, the city received an imperial garrison in 1632. However, this force was soon expelled by the Swedes, who in their turn handed the city over again to the French. Imperial forces finally succeeded in retaking it by storm in 1636.

In 1688, Koblenz was besieged by the French under Marshal de Boufflers, but they only succeeded in bombing the Old City (Altstadt) into ruins, destroying among other buildings the Old Merchants' Hall (Kaufhaus), which was restored in its present form in 1725. The city was the residence of the archbishop-electors of Trier from 1690 to 1801.

In 1786, the last archbishop-elector of Trier, Clemens Wenceslaus of Saxony, greatly assisted the extension and improvement of the city, turning the Ehrenbreitstein into a magnificent baroque palace. After the fall of the Bastille in 1789, the city became, through the invitation of the archbishop-elector's chief minister, Ferdinand Freiherr von Duminique, one of the principal rendezvous points for French émigrés. The archbishop-elector approved of this because he was the uncle of the persecuted king of France, Louis XVI. Among the many royalist French refugees who flooded into the city were Louis's two younger brothers, the Comte de Provence and the Comte d'Artois. In addition, Louis XVI's cousin, the Prince of Condé, arrived and formed an army of young aristocrats willing to fight the French Revolution and restore the Ancien Régime. The Army of Condé joined with an allied army of Prussian and Austrian soldiers led by Duke Karl Wilhelm Ferdinand of Brunswick in an unsuccessful invasion of France in 1792. This drew down the wrath of the French First Republic on the archbishop-elector; in 1794, Koblenz was taken by the French Revolutionary army under Marceau (who was killed during the siege), and, after the signing of the Treaty of Lunéville (1801) it was made the capital of the new French department of Rhin-et-Moselle.

In 1814, it was occupied by the Russians. The Congress of Vienna assigned the city to Prussia, and in 1822, it was made the seat of government for the Prussian Rhine Province.

After World War I, France occupied the area once again. The city was the centre of the American occupation force from 1919 to 1923. In defiance of the French, the German populace of the city insisted on using the more German spelling of Koblenz after 1926. During World War II, it hosted the command of German Army Group B and, like many counterparts, was heavily bombed and rebuilt afterwards. From 16 to 19 March 1945, it was the scene of heavy fighting by the U.S. 87th Infantry Division in support of Operation Lumberjack. Between 1947 and 1950, it served as the seat of government of Rhineland-Palatinate.

The Rhine Gorge was declared a World Heritage Site in 2002, with Koblenz marking the northern end.

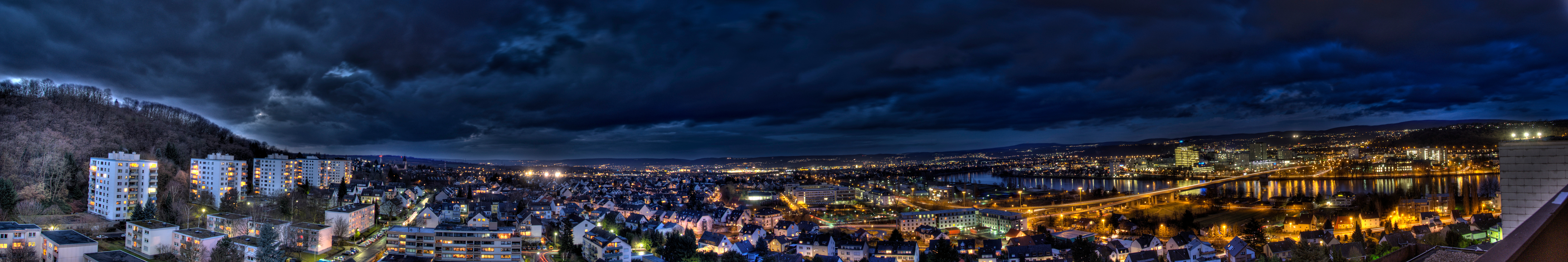
HDR panorama of Koblenz from Metternich

== Main sights ==
=== Fortified cities ===
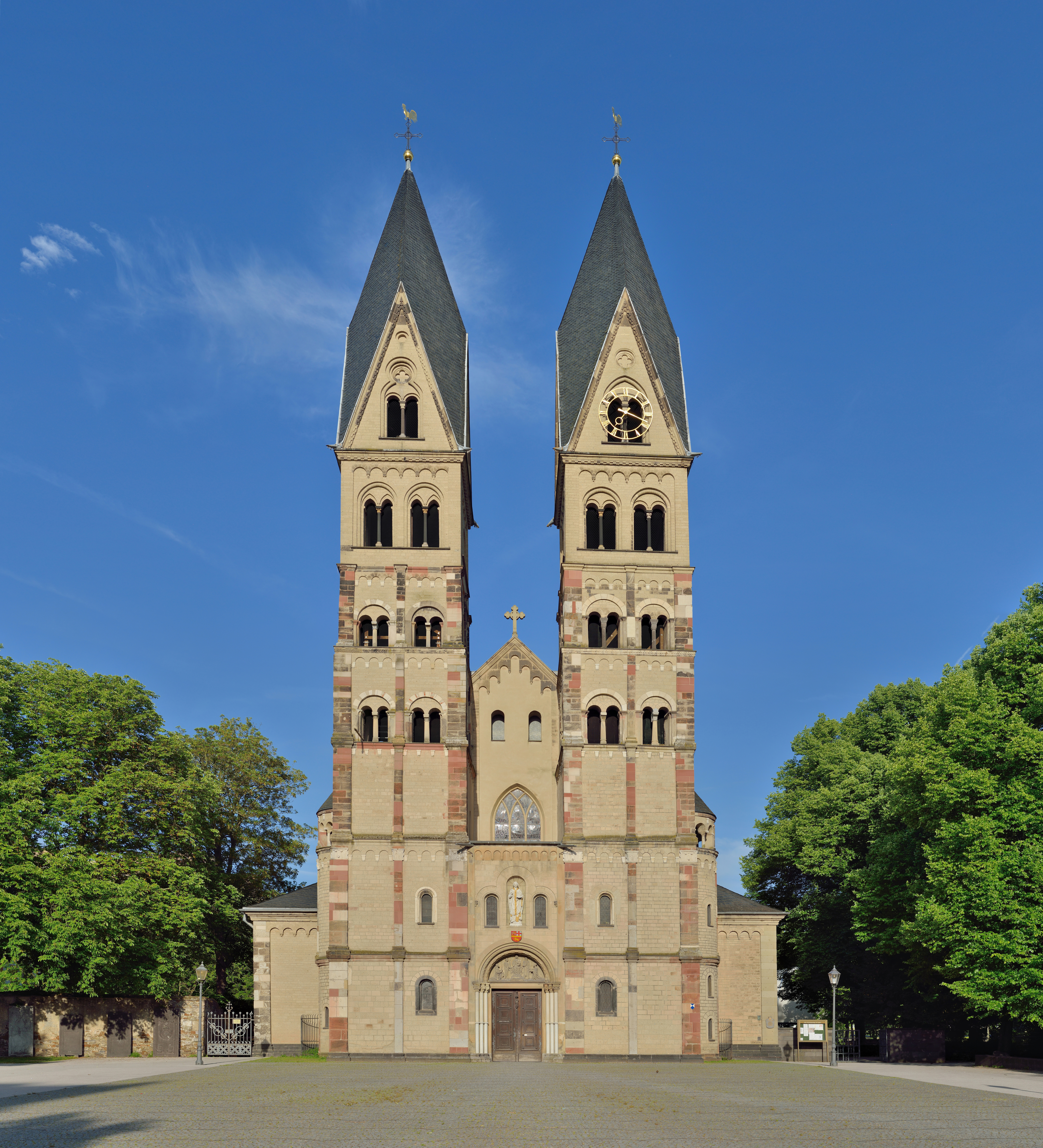
Basilica of St. Castor

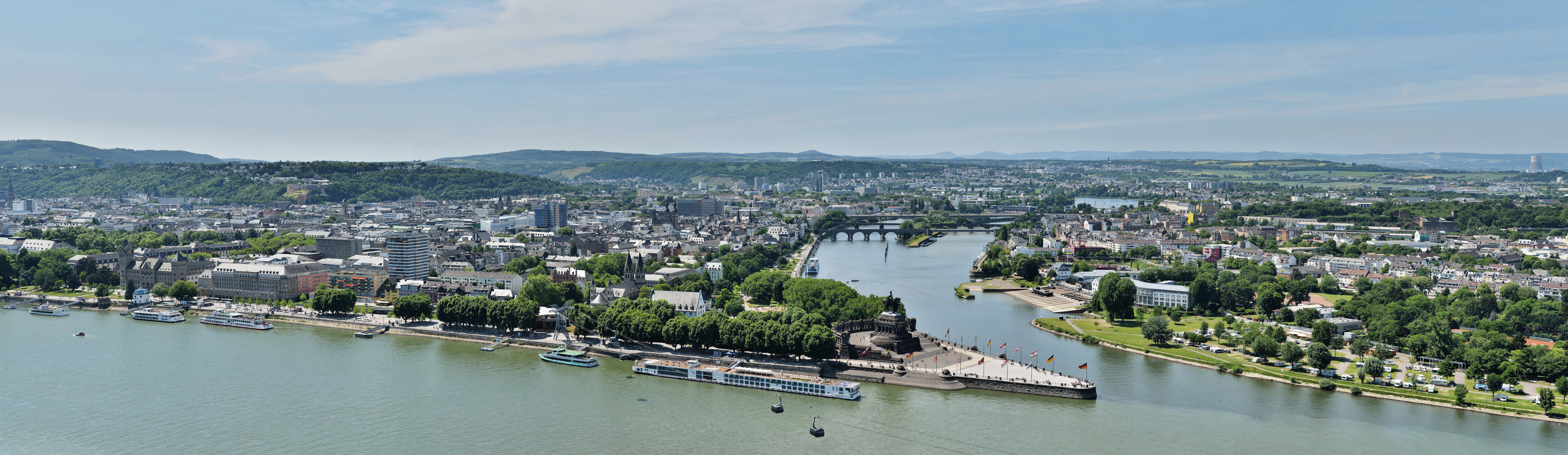
Panoramic view at Koblenz with monument at Deutsches Eck

Its defensive works are extensive and consist of strong forts crowning the hills encircling the city to the west, and the citadel of Ehrenbreitstein on the opposite bank of the Rhine. The old city was triangular in shape, two sides being bounded by the Rhine and Mosel and the third by a line of fortifications. The latter were razed in 1890, and the city was permitted to expand in this direction. The Koblenz Hauptbahnhof (central station) was built on a spacious site outside the former walls at the junction of the Cologne-Mainz railway and the strategic Metz-Berlin line. In April 2011, Koblenz-Stadtmitte station was opened in the inner city to coincide with the opening of the Federal Garden Show 2011. The Rhine is crossed by the Pfaffendorf Bridge, originally the location of a rail bridge, but now a road bridge, and a mile south of the city by the Horchheim Railway Bridge, consisting of two wide and lofty spans carrying the Lahntal railway, part of the Berlin railway referred to above. The Moselle is spanned by a Gothic freestone bridge of 14 arches, erected in 1344, two modern road bridges and also by two railway bridges.

Since 1890, the city has consisted of the Altstadt (old city) and the Neustadt (new city) or Klemenstadt. Of these, the Altstadt is closely built and has only a few fine streets and squares, while the Neustadt possesses numerous broad streets and a handsome frontage along the Rhine.

=== Electoral palace ===
In the modern part of the city lies the palace (Residenzschloss), with one front looking towards the Rhine, the other into the Neustadt. It was built in 1778–1786 by Clemens Wenceslaus, the last elector of Trier, following a design by the French architect P.M. d'Ixnard. In 1833, the palace was used as a barracks, and became a terminal post for the optical telecommunications system that originated in Potsdam. Today, the elector's former palace is a museum. Among other exhibits, it contains some Gobelin tapestries. From it, some gardens and promenades (Kaiserin Augusta Anlagen) stretch along the bank of the Rhine, and in them is a memorial to the poet Max von Schenkendorf. A statue to the empress Augusta, whose favourite residence was Koblenz, stands in the Luisenplatz.

=== William I monument ===
The Teutonic Knights were given an area for their Deutschherrenhaus Bailiwick right at the confluence of the Rhine and Mosel, which became known as German Corner (Deutsches Eck).

In 1897, a monument to German Emperor William I of Germany, mounted on a 14-meter-tall (46 ft) horse, was inaugurated there by his grandson Wilhelm II. The architect was Bruno Schmitz, who was responsible for a number of nationalistic German monuments and memorials. The German Corner is since associated with this monument, the (re) foundation of the German Empire and the German refusal of any French claims to the area, as described in the song "Die Wacht am Rhein" together with the "Wacht am Rhein" called "Niederwalddenkmal" some 60 kilometers (37 miles) upstream. During World War II, the statue was destroyed by US artillery. The French occupation administration intended the complete destruction of the monument and wanted to replace it with a new one.

In 1953, Bundespräsident Theodor Heuss rededicated the monument to German unity, adding the signs of the remaining western federal states as well as the ones of the lost areas in the East. A Flag of Germany has flown there since. The Saarland was added four years later, after the population had voted to join Germany.

In the 1980s, a film clip of the monument was often shown on late night TV when the national anthem was played to mark the end of the day, a practice which was discontinued when nonstop broadcasting became common. On 3 October 1990, the very day the former GDR states joined, their signs were added to the monument.

As German unity was considered complete and the areas under Polish administration were ceded to Poland, the monument lost its official active purpose, now only reminding of history. In 1993, the flag was replaced by a copy of the statue, donated by a local couple. The day chosen for the reinstatement of the statue, however, caused controversy as it coincided with Sedantag (Sedan Day) (2 September 1870), a day of celebration remembering Germany's victory over France in the Battle of Sedan. The event was widely celebrated from the 1870s until the 1910s.

=== Kloster Arenberg ===
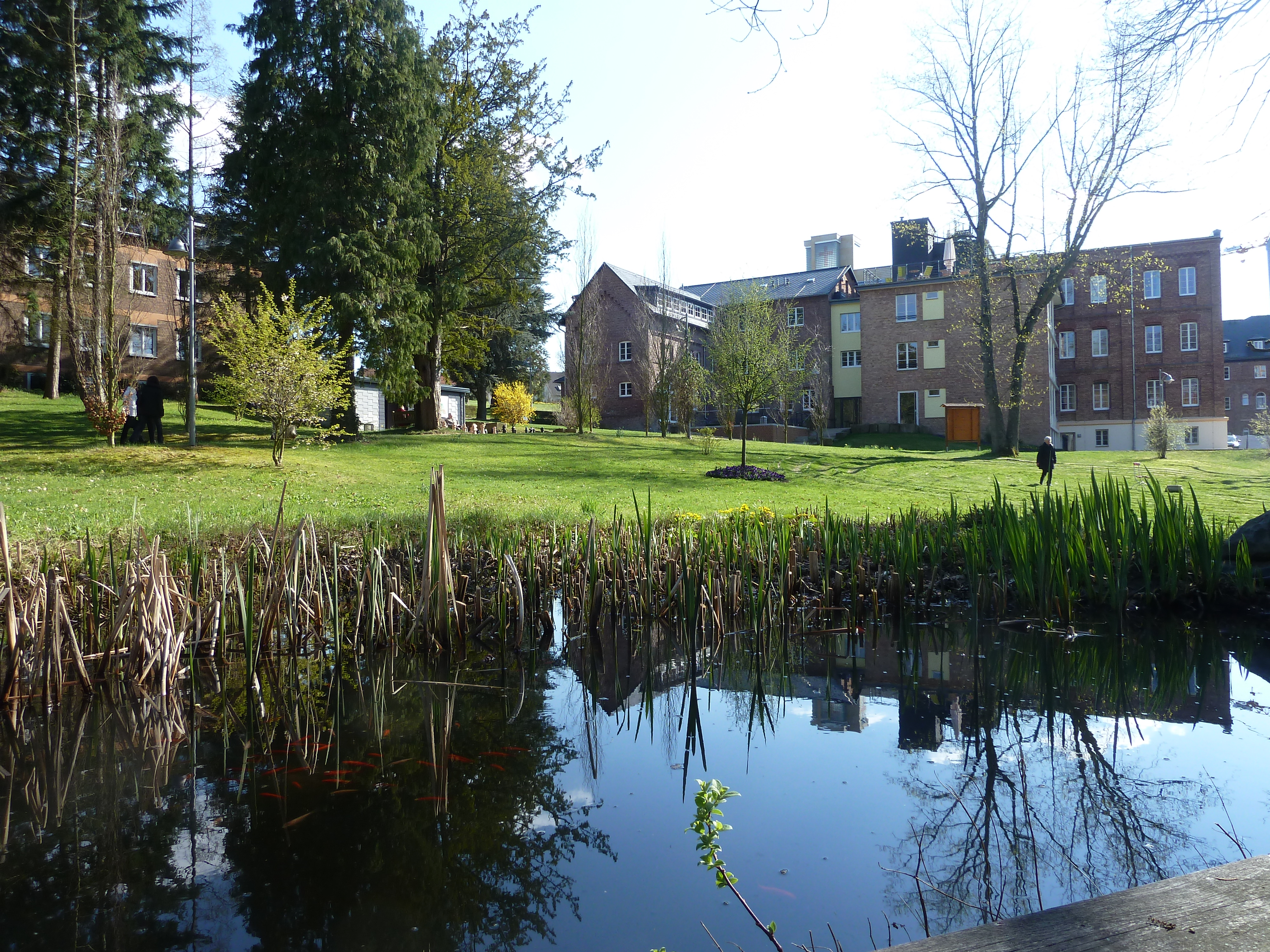
Nunnery in Arenberg district

The Kloster Arenberg of the Dominicains, is located in the district Arenberg.

=== Other sights ===
In the more ancient part of Koblenz stand several buildings which have a historical interest. Prominent among these, near the point of confluence of the rivers, is the Basilica of St. Castor or Kastorkirche, dedicated to Castor of Karden, with four towers. The church was founded in 836 by Louis the Pious, but the present Romanesque building was completed in 1208, the Gothic vaulted roof dating from 1498. In front of the church of Saint Castor stands a fountain, erected by the French in 1812, with an inscription to commemorate Napoleon's invasion of Russia. Not long after, Russian troops occupied Koblenz, and St. Priest, their commander, added in irony these words: "Vu et approuvé par nous, Commandant russe de la Ville de Coblence: 1er Janvier 1814."

In this quarter of the city, too, is the Liebfrauenkirche, a fine church (nave 1250, choir 1404–1431) with lofty late Romanesque towers; the castle of the electors of Trier, erected in 1280, which now contains the municipal picture gallery; and the family house of the Metternichs, where Prince Metternich, the Austrian statesman, was born in 1773. Also notable is the church of St. Florian, with a two towers façade from c. 1110.

The former Jesuit College is a Baroque edifice by J.C. Sebastiani (1694–1698), which now serves as the current City Hall. Near Koblenz is the Lahneck Castle near Lahnstein, open to visitors from 1 April to 31 October. The city is close to the Bronze Age earthworks at Goloring, a possible Urnfield calendar constructed some 3,000 years ago. The mild climate allows fig trees, olive trees, palm trees and other Mediterranean plants to grow in the area.

Sightings

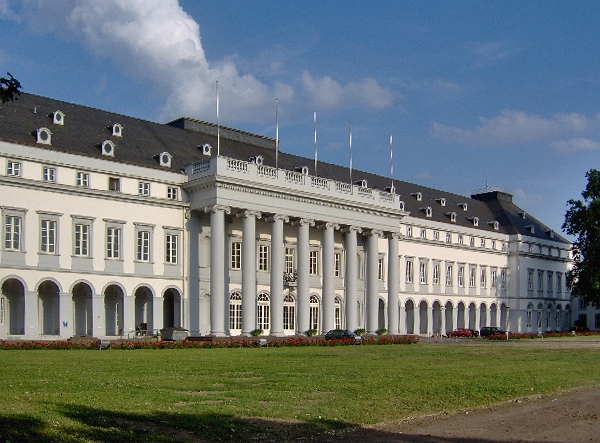
Palace of the archbishop-electors of Trier

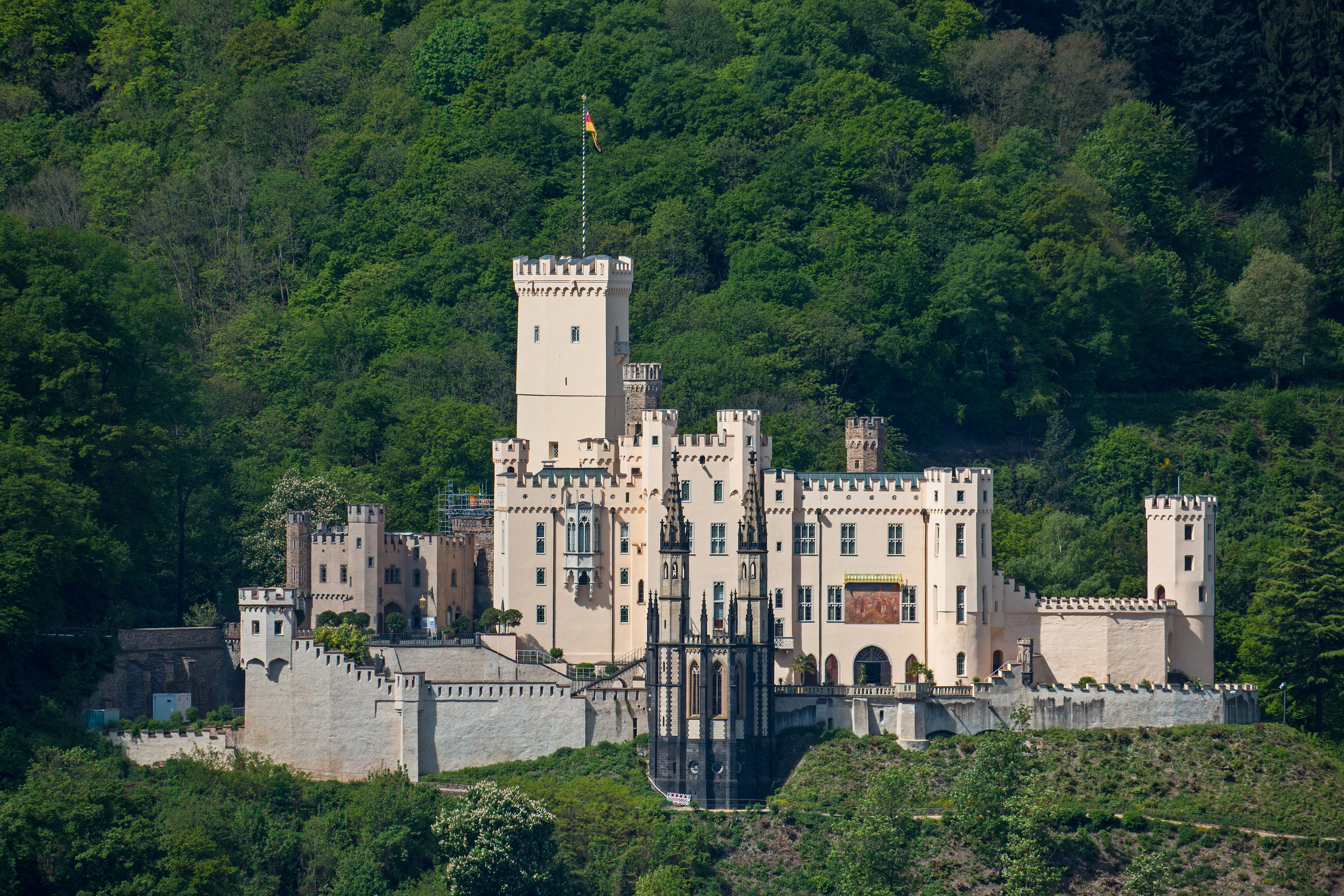
Stolzenfels Castle

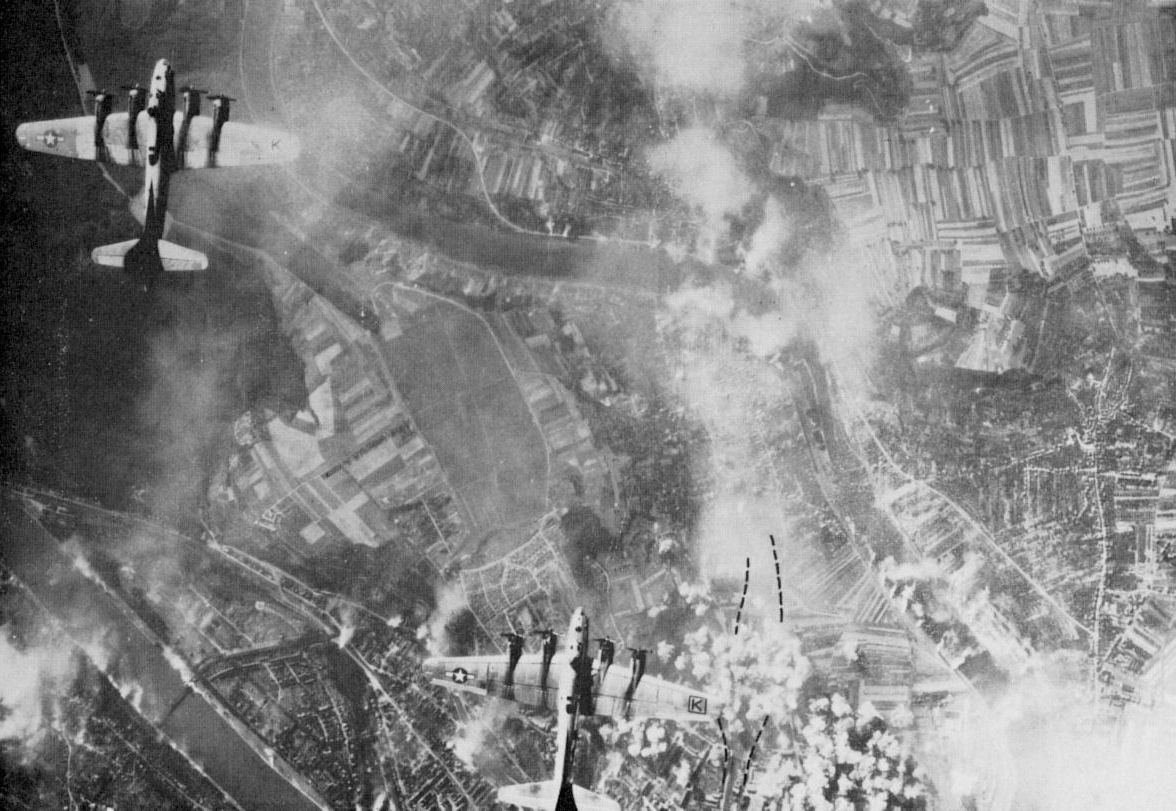
US Air Force bombing in 1944

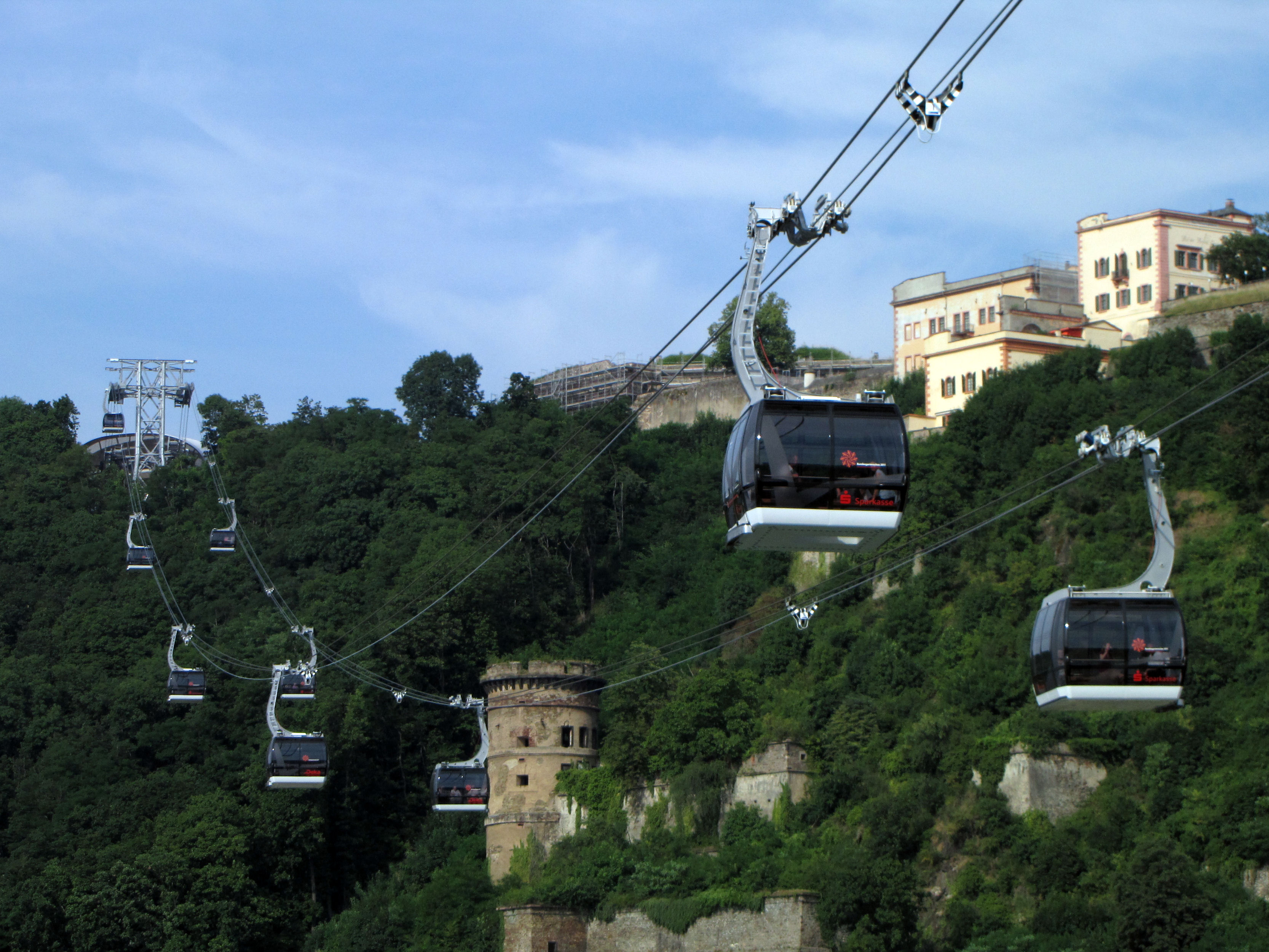
Since 2010 the Koblenz cable car has been Germany's biggest aerial tramway.

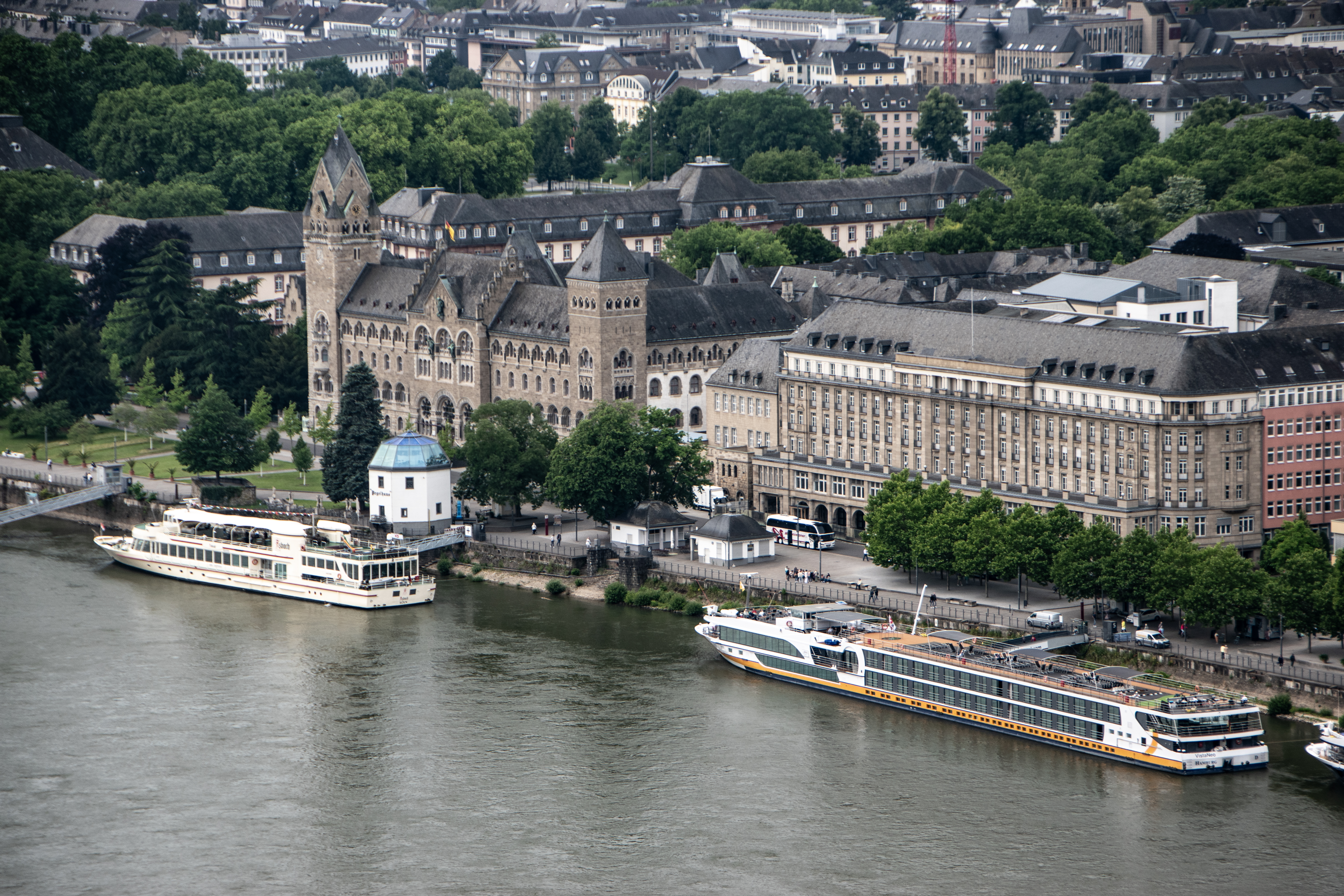
Headquarters of the Federal Office of Bundeswehr Equipment, Information Technology and In-Service Support

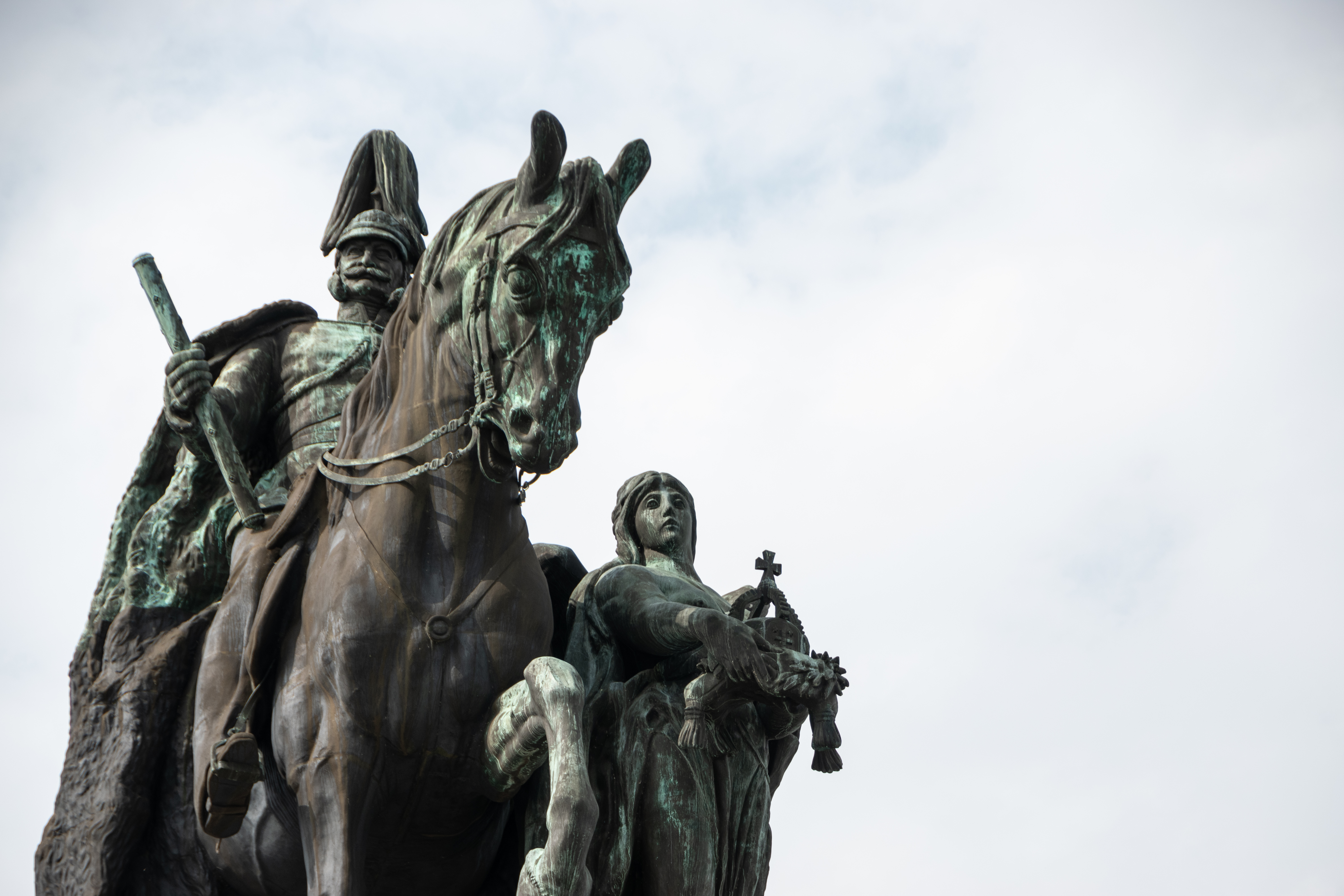
Statue of Kaiser Wilhelm I, Deutsches Eck

== Districts ==
Most districts formerly have been separate villages that are now incorporated into the jurisdiction of the city of Koblenz:

Date	Village	Area	Date	Village	Area
1 July 1891	Neuendorf and Lützel	547 hectares (2.1 sq mi)	7 June 1969	Kesselheim	?
1 April 1902	Moselweiß	382 hectares (1.5 sq mi)	7 June 1969	Kapellen-Stolzenfels	?
1 October 1923	Wallersheim	229 hectares (0.88 sq mi)	7 November 1970	Arenberg-Immendorf	?
1 July 1937	Asterstein (part of Pfaffendorf)	?	7 November 1970	Arzheim	487 hectares (1.9 sq mi)
1 July 1937	Ehrenbreitstein	120 hectares (0.46 sq mi)	7 November 1970	Bubenheim	314 hectares (1.2 sq mi)
1 July 1937	Horchheim	772 hectares (3.0 sq mi)	7 November 1970	Güls and Bisholder	?
1 July 1937	Metternich	483 hectares (1.9 sq mi)	7 November 1970	Lay	?
1 July 1937	Niederberg	203 hectares (0.78 sq mi)	7 November 1970	Rübenach	?
1 July 1937	Pfaffendorf (remaining) and Asterstein	369 hectares (1.4 sq mi)			

== Climate ==
Climate data for Koblenz (Bendorf) (1991–2020 normals)
Month	Jan	Feb	Mar	Apr	May	Jun	Jul	Aug	Sep	Oct	Nov	Dec	Year
Mean daily maximum °C (°F)	5.2 (41.4)	6.7 (44.1)	11.7 (53.1)	16.6 (61.9)	20.3 (68.5)	23.4 (74.1)	25.2 (77.4)	25.5 (77.9)	20.6 (69.1)	15.1 (59.2)	9.3 (48.7)	5.2 (41.4)	15.2 (59.4)
Daily mean °C (°F)	2.5 (36.5)	3.4 (38.1)	6.7 (44.1)	10.7 (51.3)	14.3 (57.7)	17.3 (63.1)	19.3 (66.7)	19.0 (66.2)	14.8 (58.6)	10.6 (51.1)	6.4 (43.5)	2.7 (36.9)	10.5 (50.9)
Mean daily minimum °C (°F)	−0.3 (31.5)	0.2 (32.4)	2.7 (36.9)	5.3 (41.5)	9.0 (48.2)	12.0 (53.6)	13.8 (56.8)	13.6 (56.5)	10.4 (50.7)	7.0 (44.6)	3.8 (38.8)	0.3 (32.5)	6.3 (43.3)
Average precipitation mm (inches)	41.5 (1.63)	34.4 (1.35)	44.6 (1.76)	36.1 (1.42)	59.1 (2.33)	65.8 (2.59)	75.9 (2.99)	62.1 (2.44)	62.6 (2.46)	49.3 (1.94)	52.6 (2.07)	52.8 (2.08)	630.0 (24.80)
Average precipitation days (≥ 1.0 mm)	15.1	13.9	16.0	12.6	14.4	13.8	15.7	13.4	13.4	15.1	17.5	17.3	177.6
Average relative humidity (%)	82.9	80.5	74.0	69.4	70.3	70.6	70.7	70.9	78.4	82.1	85.0	85.4	76.8
Mean monthly sunshine hours	52.2	68.0	118.8	177.6	195.1	202.3	192.2	197.4	137.9	94.7	42.9	40.0	1,486.4
Source: NOAA

== Economy ==
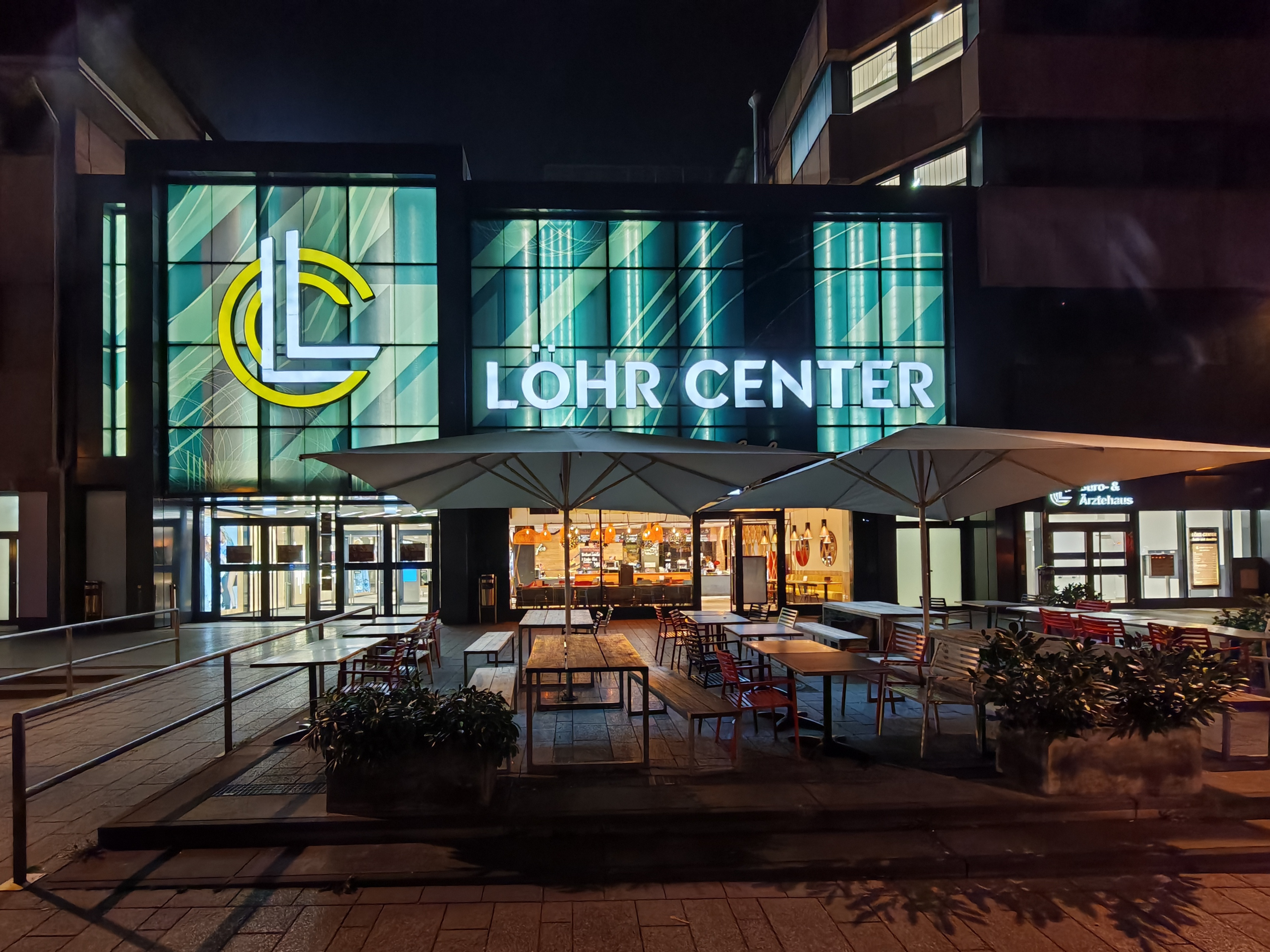
Loehr Center

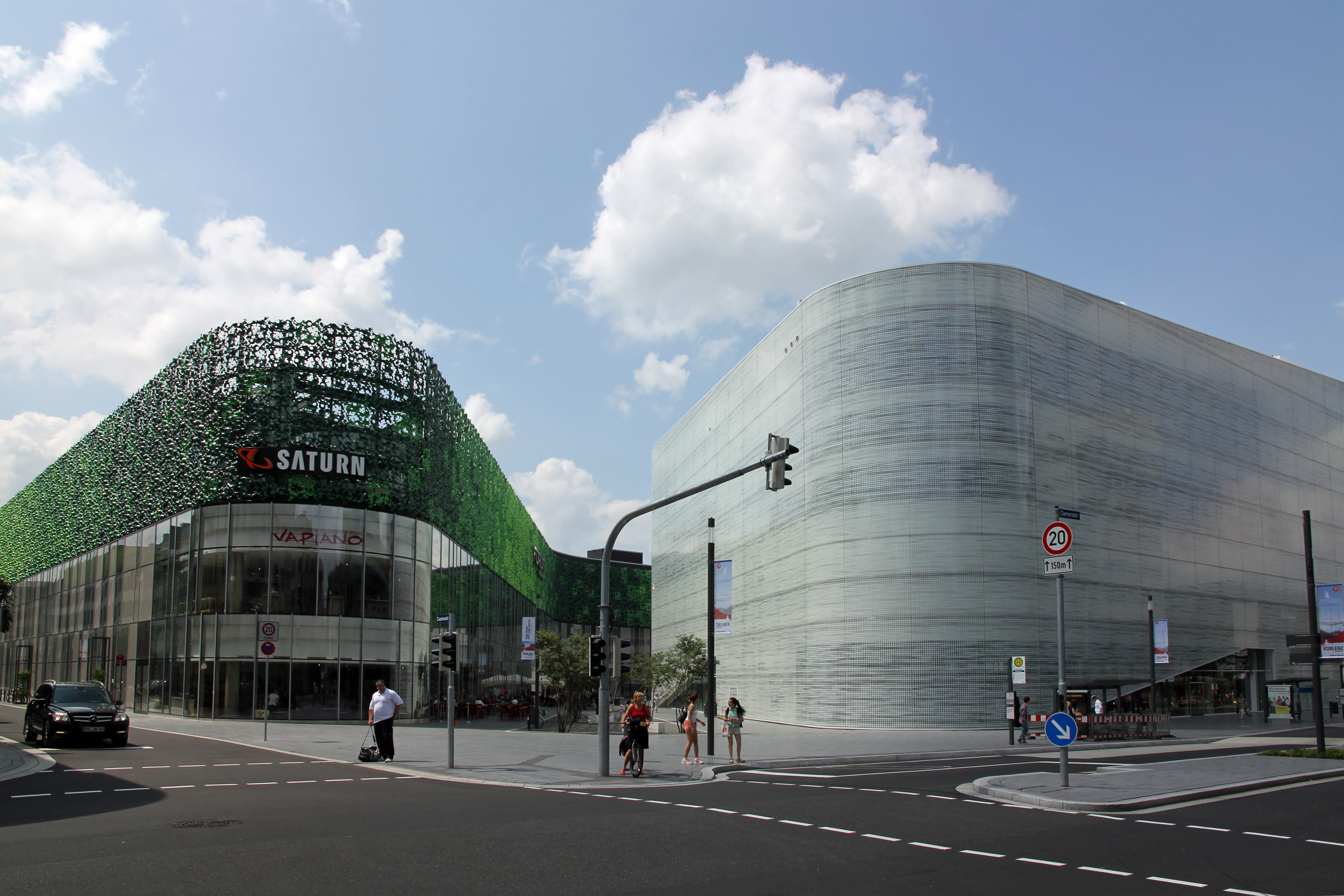
Forum Mittelrhein (left)

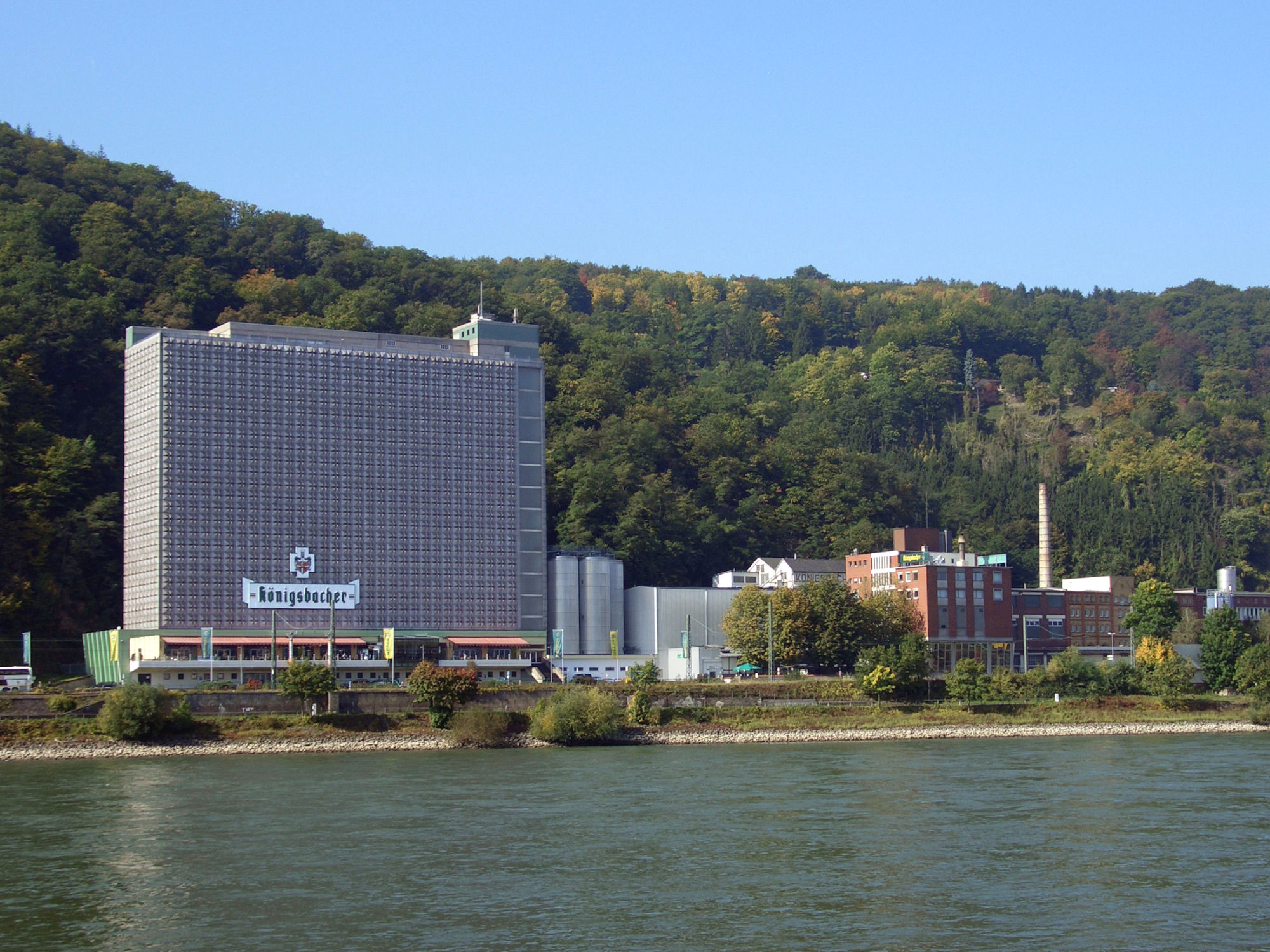
Königsbacher brewery

Center of infrastructure is the district Altstadt, where most stores, F&B's and servicers are located, the street with most stores is Loehrst., two malls are located there, the Loehr Center and the Forum Mittelrhein.

Koblenz is a principal seat of the Mosel and Rhenish wine trade, and also does a large business in the export of mineral waters. Its manufactures include automotive parts (braking systems – TRW Automotive, gas springs and hydraulic vibration dampers – Stabilus), aluminium coils (Aleris International, Inc.), pianos, paper, cardboard, machinery, boats, and barges. Since the 17th century, it has been home to the Königsbacher (now Koblenzer) brewery (the Old Brewery in Koblenz's historic centre, and now a plant in Koblenz-Stolzenfels). It is an important regional transit hub.

The headquarters of the German Army Forces Command was located in the city until 2012. Its successor, the German Army Command (German: Kommando Heer, Kdo H) is based at the von-Hardenberg-Kaserne in Strausberg, Brandenburg.

The Bundeswehr's Joint Medical Service Headquarters was formed in 2012 as part of a larger reorganisation of the Bundeswehr. It is based at the Falckenstein-Barracks (Falckenstein-Kaserne) and the Rhine-Barracks (Rhein-Kaserne) in Koblenz. It is the high command of the German Army Joint Medical Service. The Headquarters is also the Staff of the Inspector of the Joint Medical Service, Generaloberstabsarzt Dr Ulrich Baumgaertner.

An Amazon logistics hub located some 15 kilometers (9 miles) outside the city at the Autobahn Kreuz Koblenz has been in operation since 19 September 2012.

The international headquarters of Canyon Bicycles GmbH is also in Koblenz, which is where it began in 1985.

== Transport ==
=== City/local bus transport ===
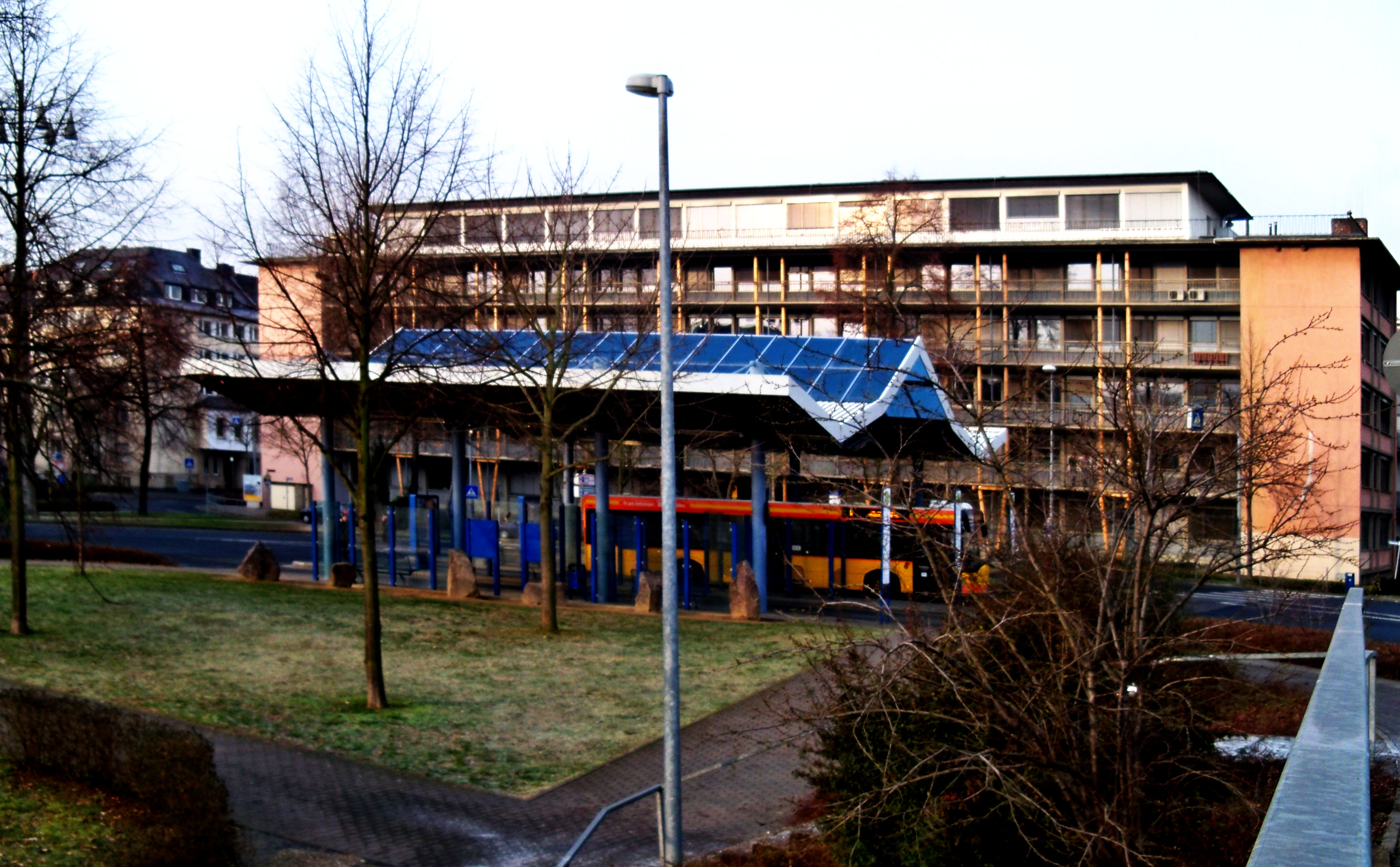
Rhein Mosel Halle bus station.with city bus of KOVEB / EVM

City busses are operated by Energieversorgung Mittelrhein (EVM) (former KEVAG), section Koblenzer Verkehrsbetriebe (KOVEB), local busses, that also can be used for rides within the city by Rhein-Mosel-Bus und Kraftwagen-Verkehr Koblenz (KVG).

=== Ferries ===
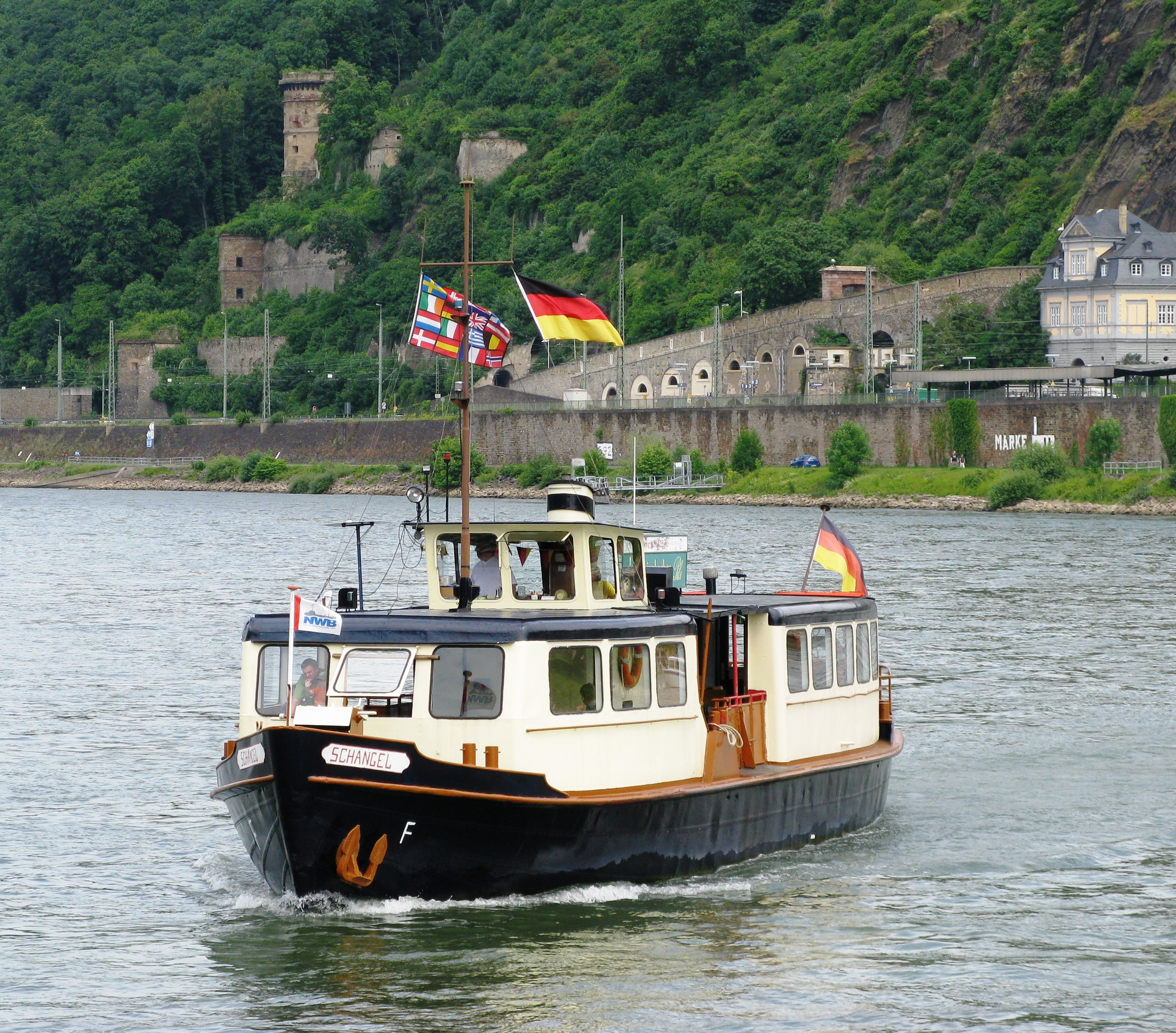
Ferry passing the Rhine in Kobmenz

There are two ferry lines, Koblenz Altstadt - Koblenz Ehrenbreitstein and Koblenz-Altstadt - Koblenz-Neuendorf which are integrated into the VRM fare.

=== Cable cars ===
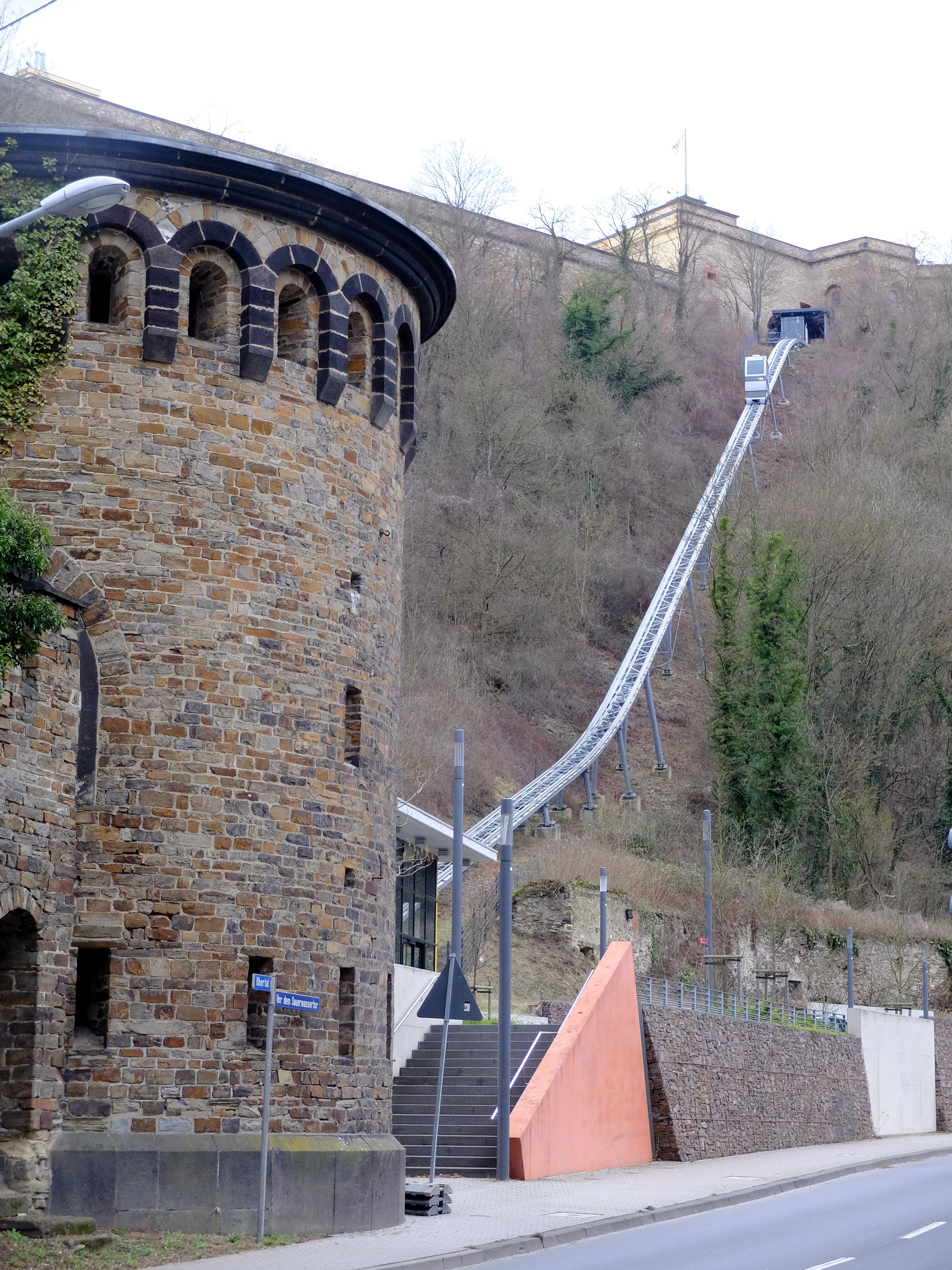
Cable car between Ehrenbreitstein valley and Ehrenbreitstein fortress

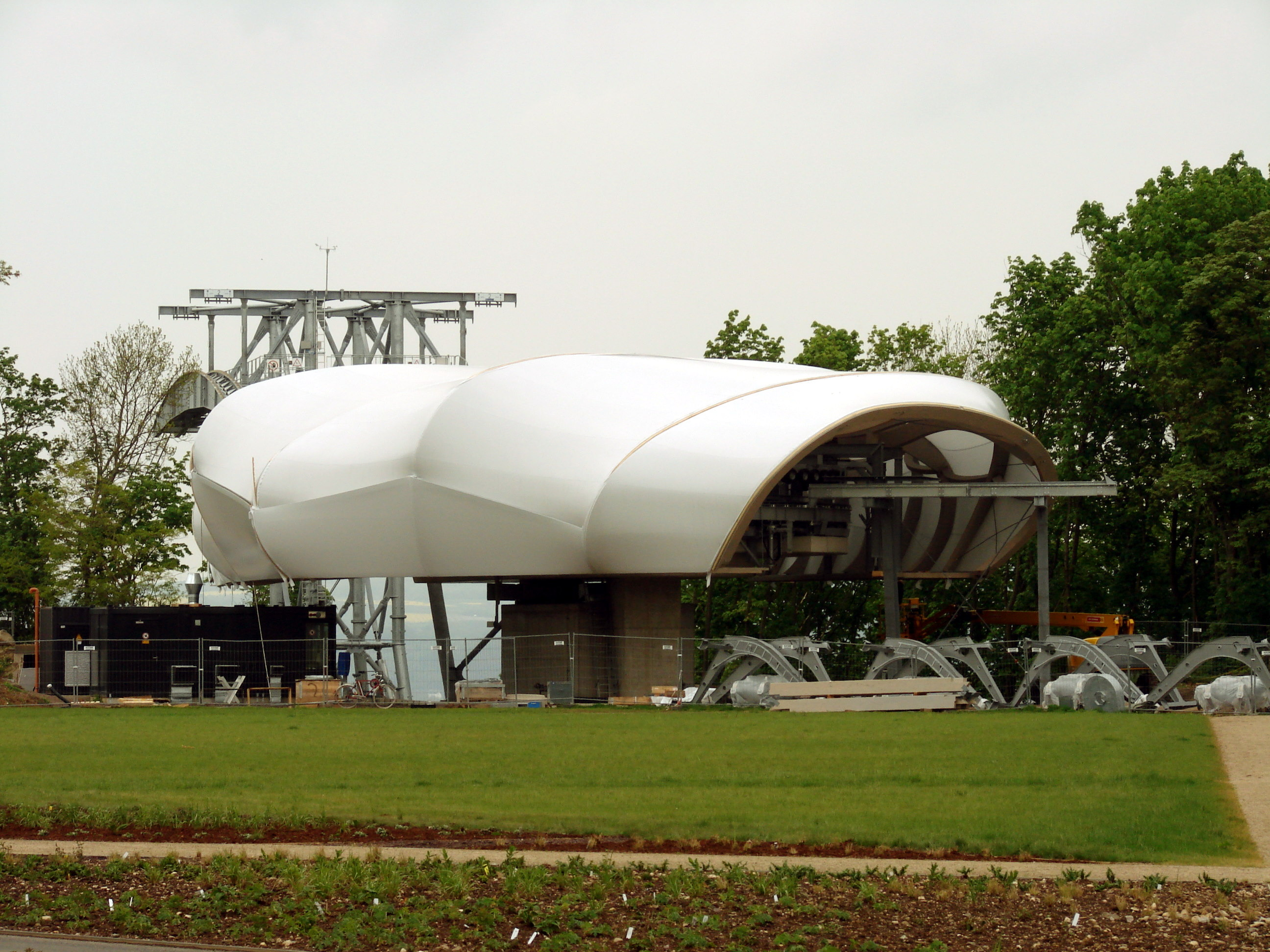
Koblenz Seilbahn (aerial ropeway), Ehrenbreitstein fortress station

There are two cable cars, Koblenz-Ehrenbreitstein (valley) - Ehrenbreitstein fortress, which is integrated into the VRM fare and the aerial ropeway from Koblenz-Altstadt to Ehrenbreitstein fortress (mountain), not integrated into the VRM fare.

=== Roads ===
To the west of the town is the autobahn A 61, connecting Ludwigshafen and Mönchengladbach, to the north is the east–west running A 48, connecting the A 1, Saarbrücken-Cologne, with the A 3, Frankfurt-Cologne. The city is also on various federal highways 9, 42, 49, 416, 258 and 327. The Glockenberg Tunnel connects the Pfaffendorf Bridge to the B 42.

The following bridges cross:

- the Rhine: Bendorf Autobahn Bridge, Pfaffendorf Bridge, Horchheim Rail Bridge, South Bridge
- the Moselle: Balduin Bridge, Mosel Rail Bridge, Europe Bridge, Koblenz Barrage, Kurt-Schumacher Bridge, Güls Rail Bridge

=== Air ===
The nearest airport is Hahn Airport, which is located approximately 69 km south of Koblenz. Frankfurt Airport is also reasonably close, it is also 113 km away from Koblenz, Cologne Bonn Airport also is reachable straight by train.

=== Railways ===
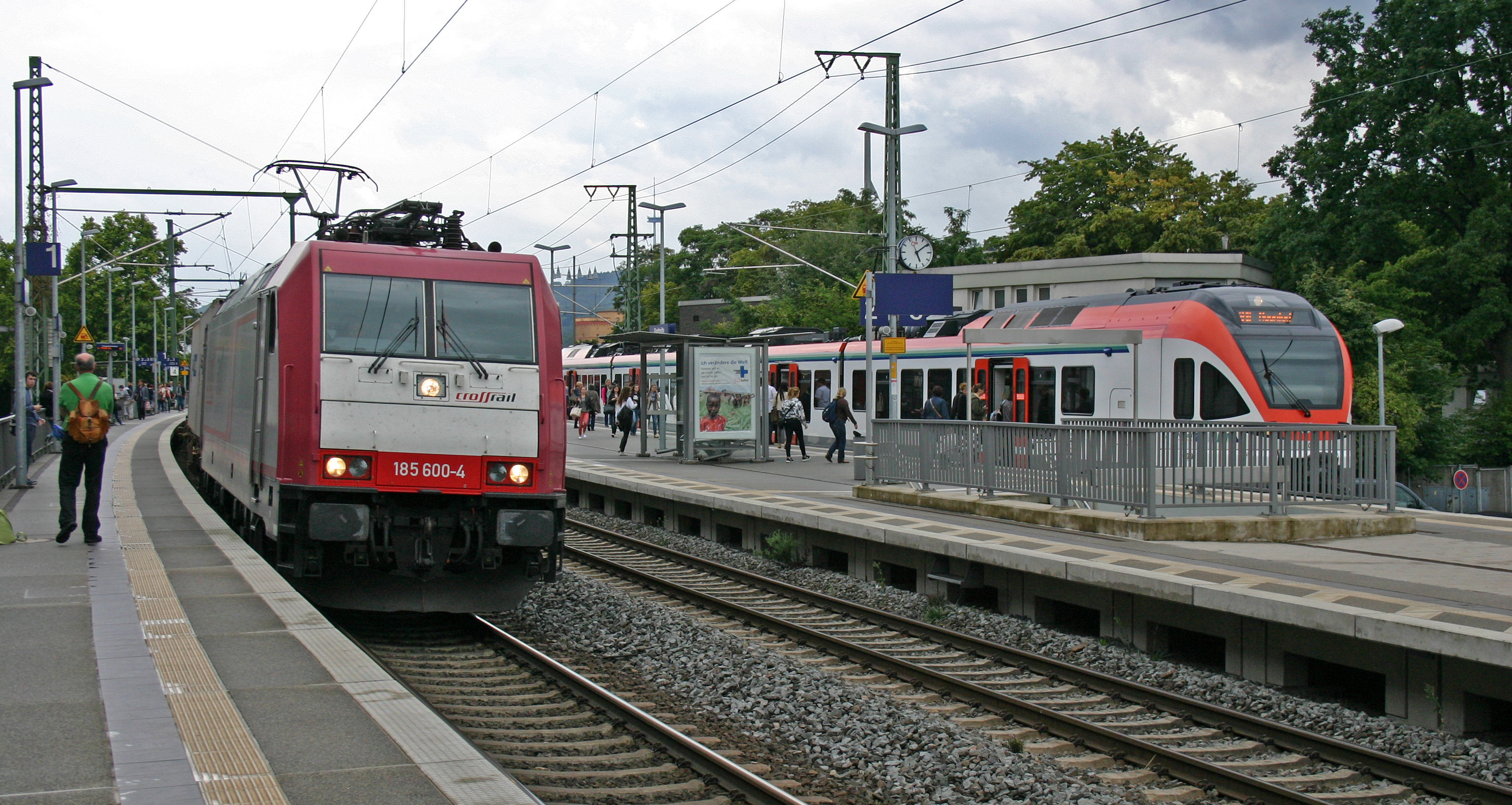
Koblenz Stadtmitte train stop

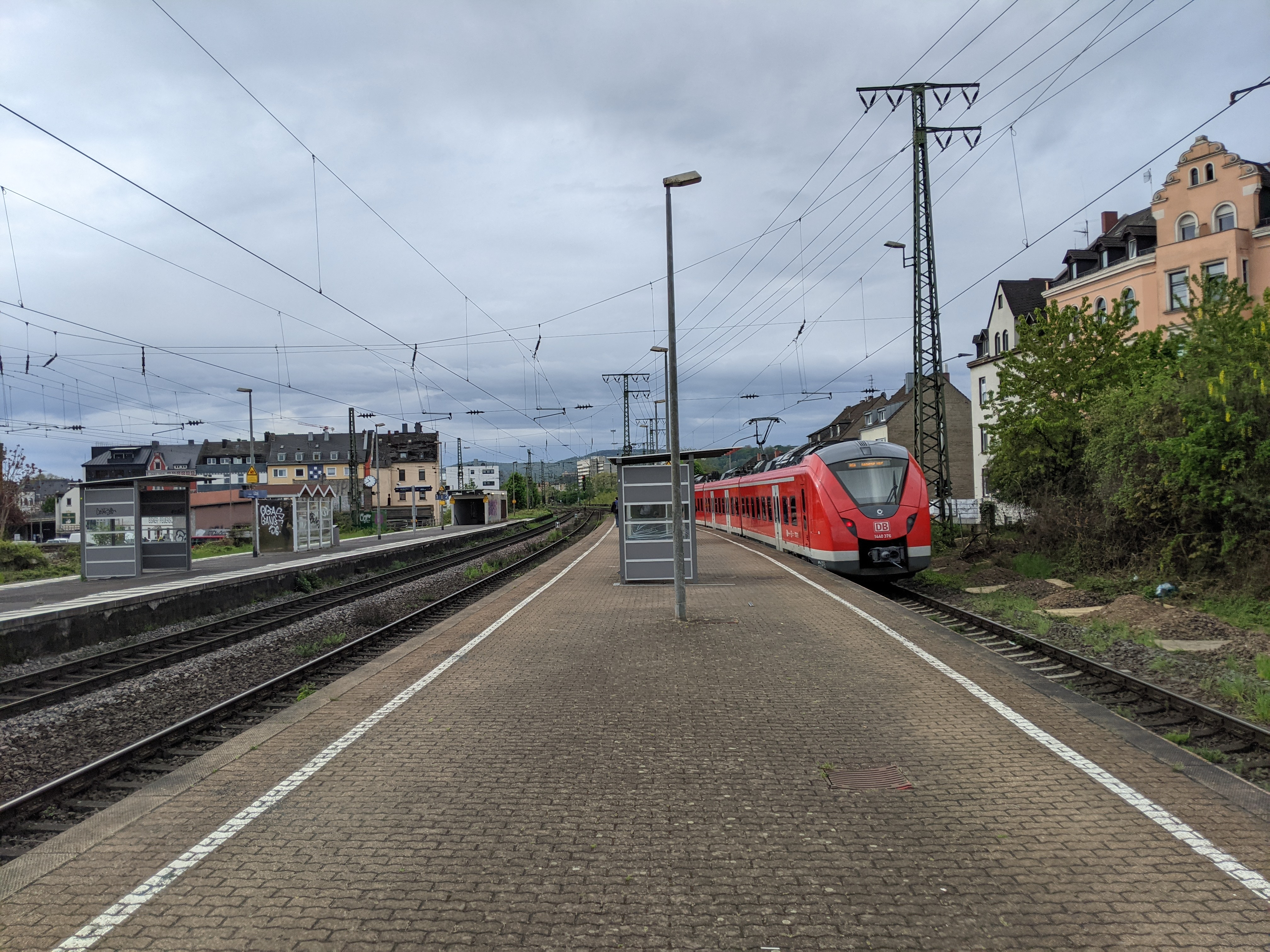
Koblenz-Lützel train station

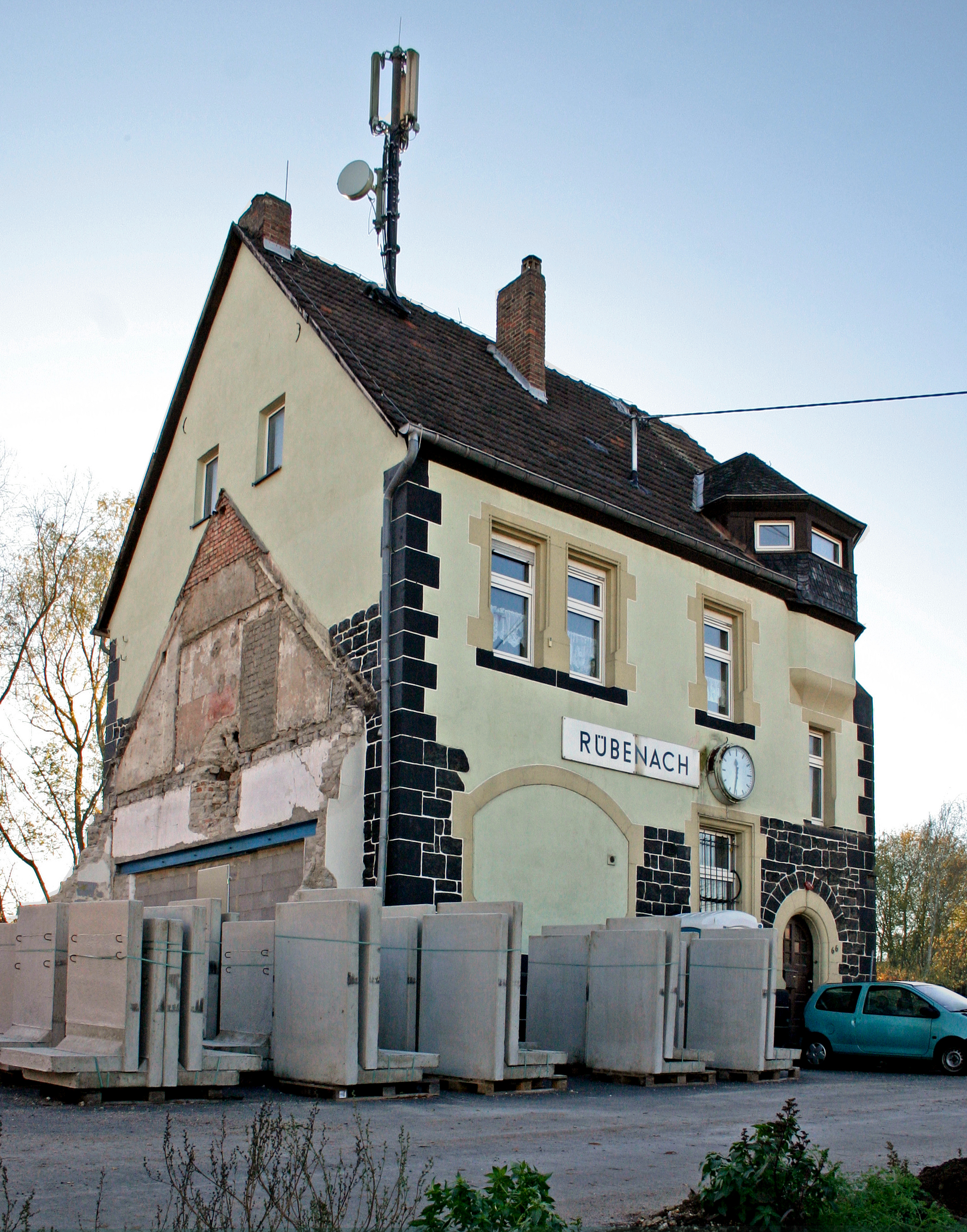
Former train station in Koblenz-Rübenach

Koblenz Hbf is an long-distance train stop on the West Rhine Railway between Bonn and Mainz and is also served by trains on the East Rhine Railway Wiesbaden–Cologne. Koblenz is the beginning of the Moselle line to Trier (and connecting to Luxemburg and Saarbrücken) and the Lahntal railway to Limburg and Gießen.

The other stations in Koblenz are Koblenz-Ehrenbreitstein, Koblenz-Güls, Koblenz-Lützel, Koblenz-Moselweiß and Koblenz Stadtmitte, which opened on 14 April 2011.

The former Koblenz-Lützel - Polch -Mayen Ost railway line, which is out of service nowadays, had stations in the districts Rübenach and Metternich.

=== Long distance bus ===
A stop for long distance busses is located close to Hauptbahnhof, served primarely by FlixBus.

=== Transport association ===
VRM logo

Koblenz is located in the area of the transport association Verkehrsverbund Rhein-Mosel (VRM), in the following zones: 101 (downtown), 102 (Karthause, Oberwerth), 103 (Rauental, Lay), 104 (Metternich), 105 (Neuendorf), 106 (Ehrenbreitstein, Arenberg), 107 (Pfaffendorf, Asterstein) as well as zone number 100 (whole city of Koblenz).

Also the headquarter of VRM is located in Koblenz downtown, at Schloßstraße 18–20.

Maps

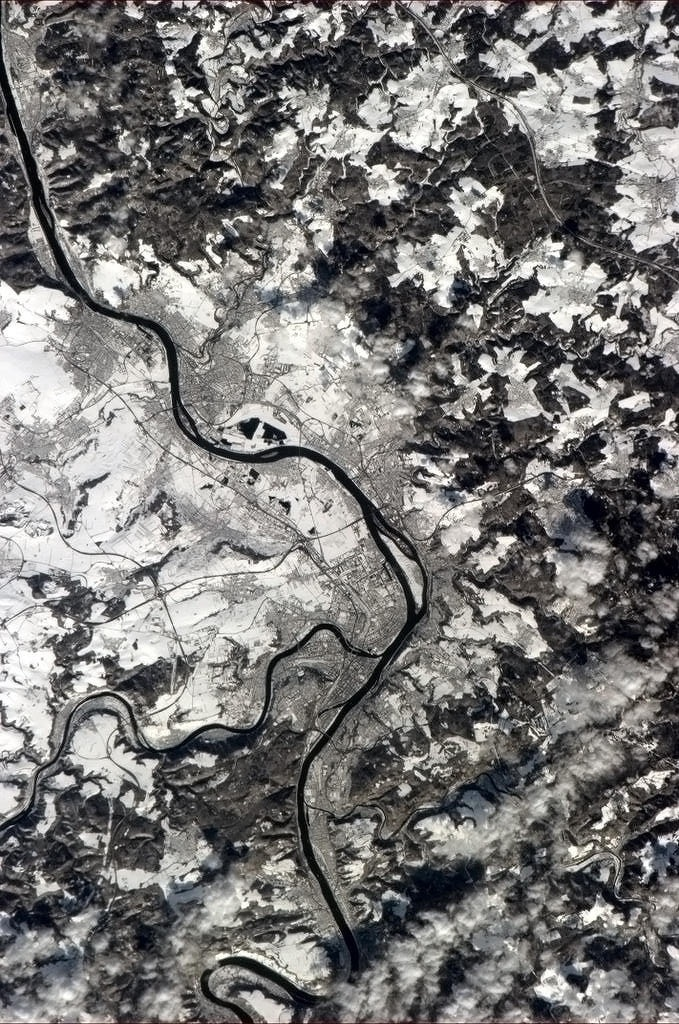
Koblenz, as seen from the International Space Station

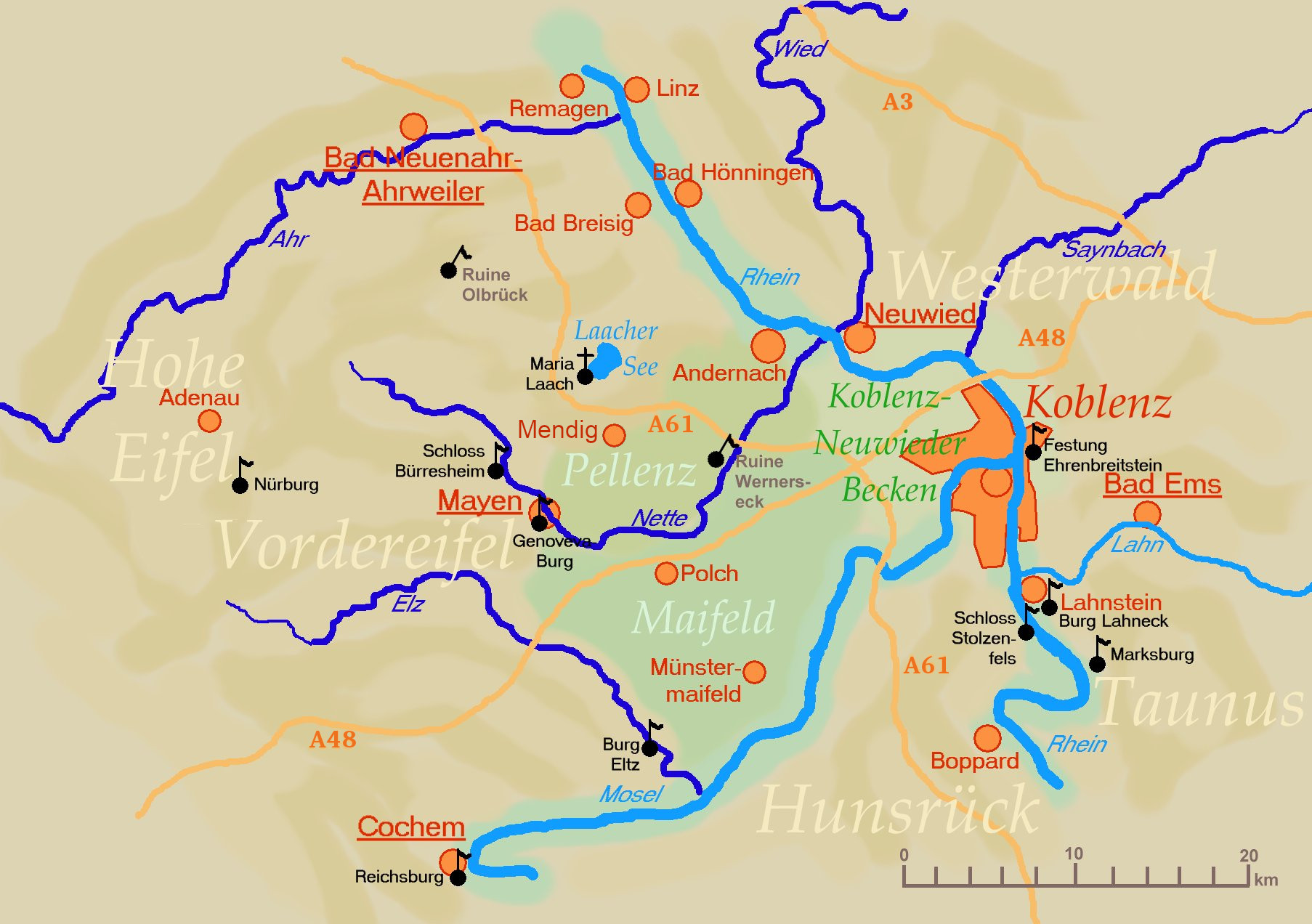
Map of the Koblenz region

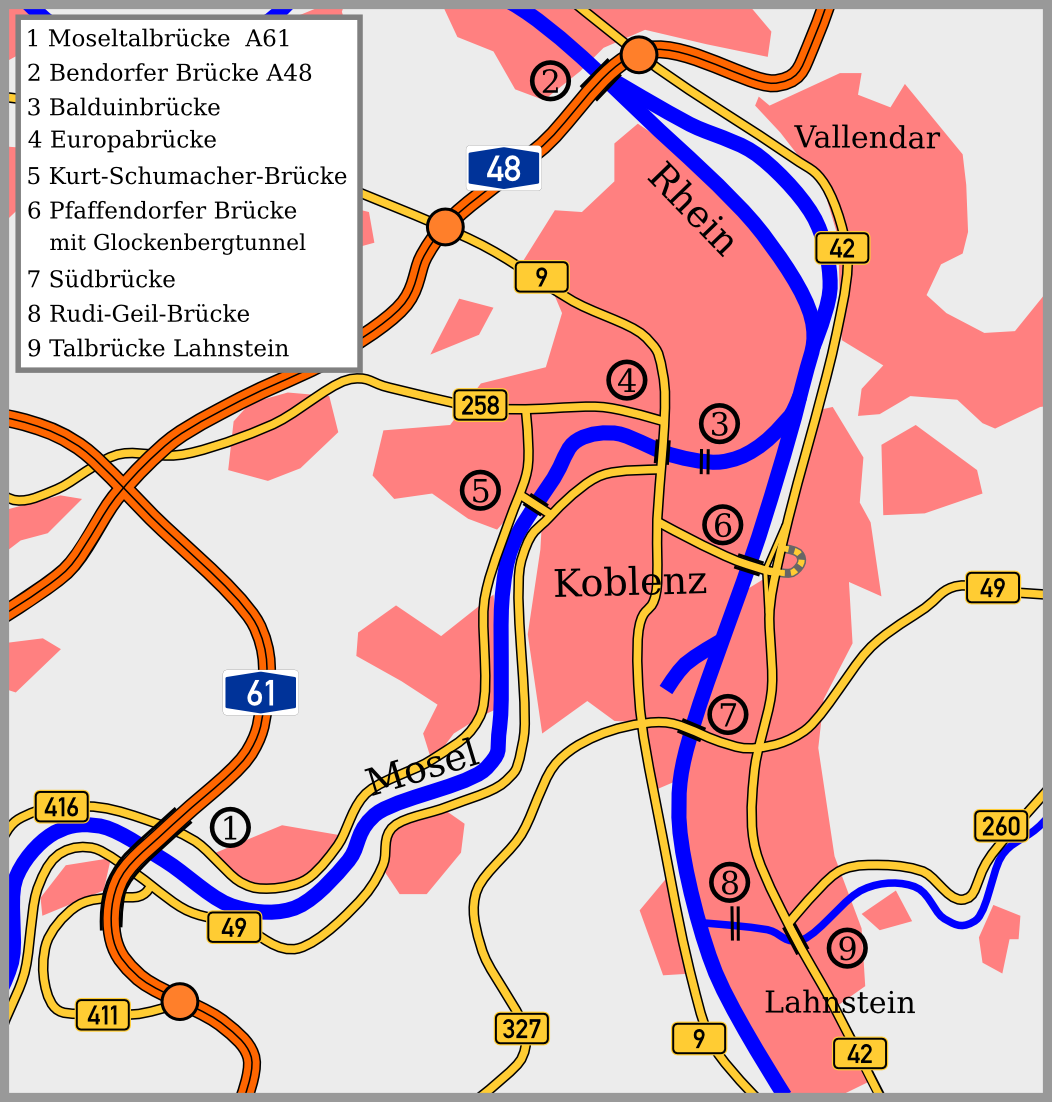
Road map

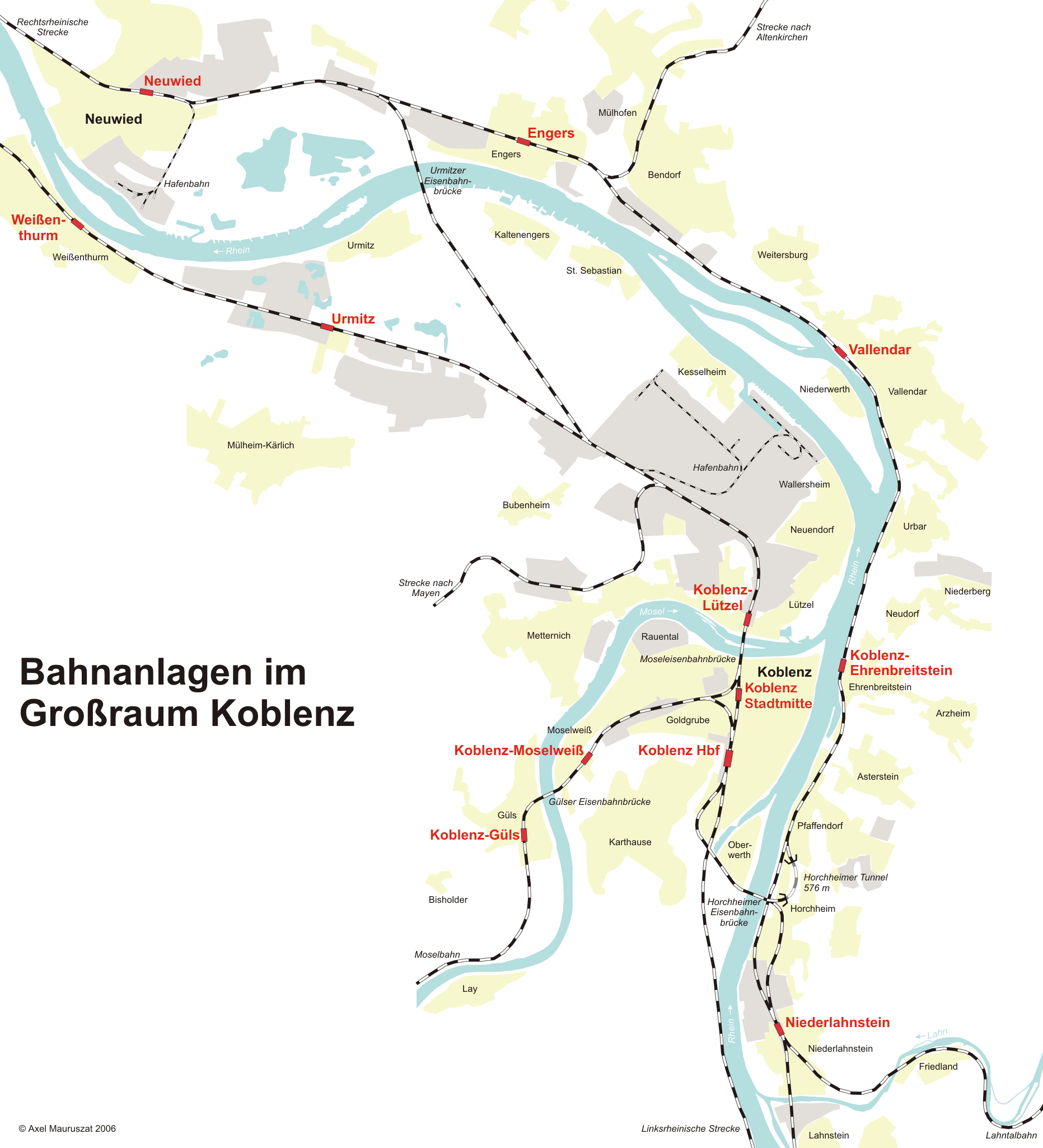
Map of railways in greater Koblenz

== Education ==
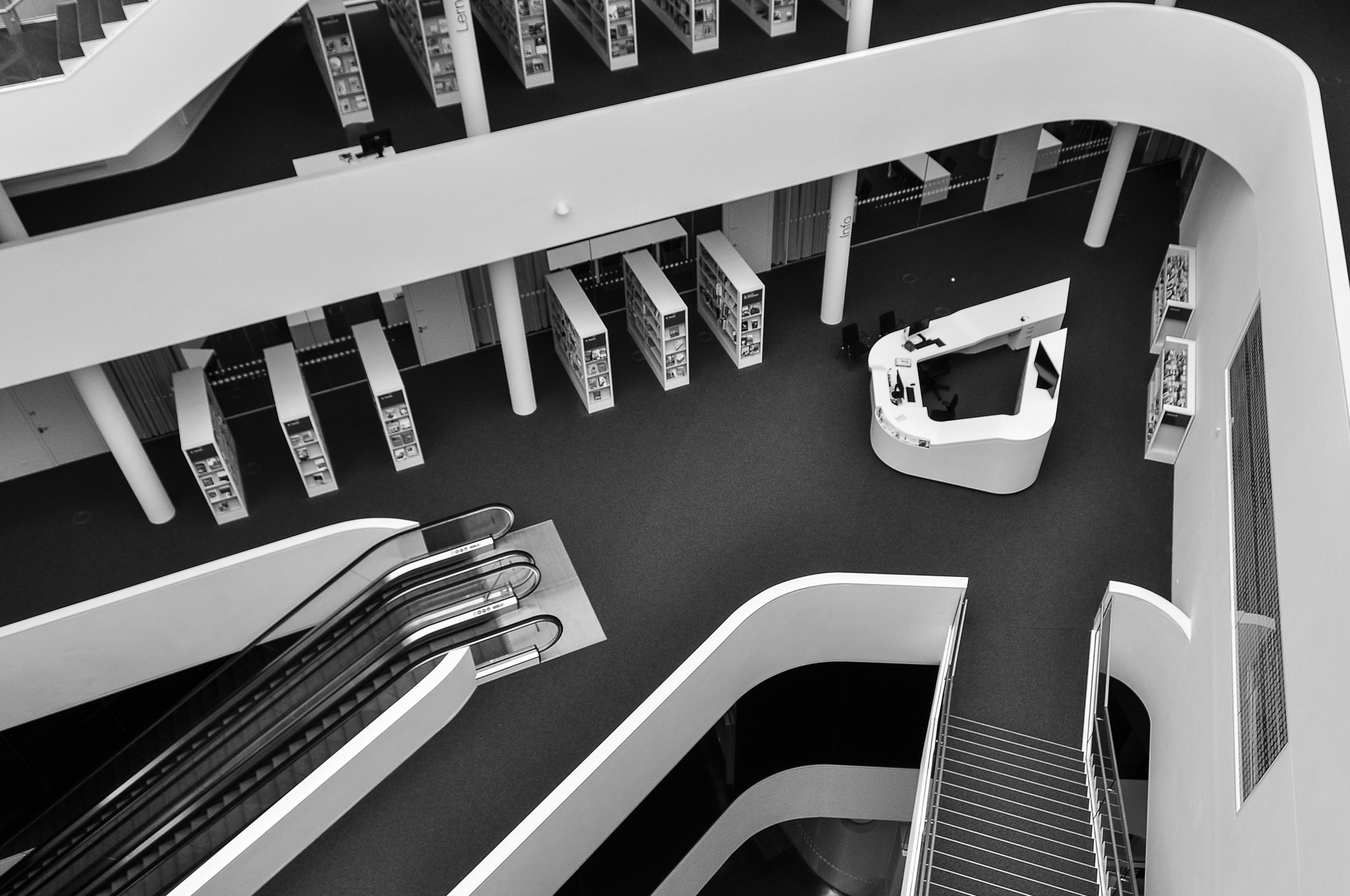
Stadtbibliothek (city library) inside Forum Confluences at Zentralplatz

In the Forum Confluentes building, on the Zentralplatz, next to Forum Mittelrhein, the City libraty, the Mittelrhein museum and the tourist information office are located in as well as the observation deck.

The campus of University of Koblenz is located in the city. The Koblenz University of Applied Sciences (German: Hochschule Koblenz) is also located in the city.

== Twin towns – sister cities ==
Koblenz is twinned with:

- Nevers, France (1963)
- Haringey, United Kingdom (1969)
- Norwich, United Kingdom (1978)
- Maastricht, Netherlands (1981)
- Novara, Italy (1991)
- Austin, United States (1992)
- Petah Tikva, Israel (2000)
- Varaždin, Croatia (2007)

== Popular culture ==
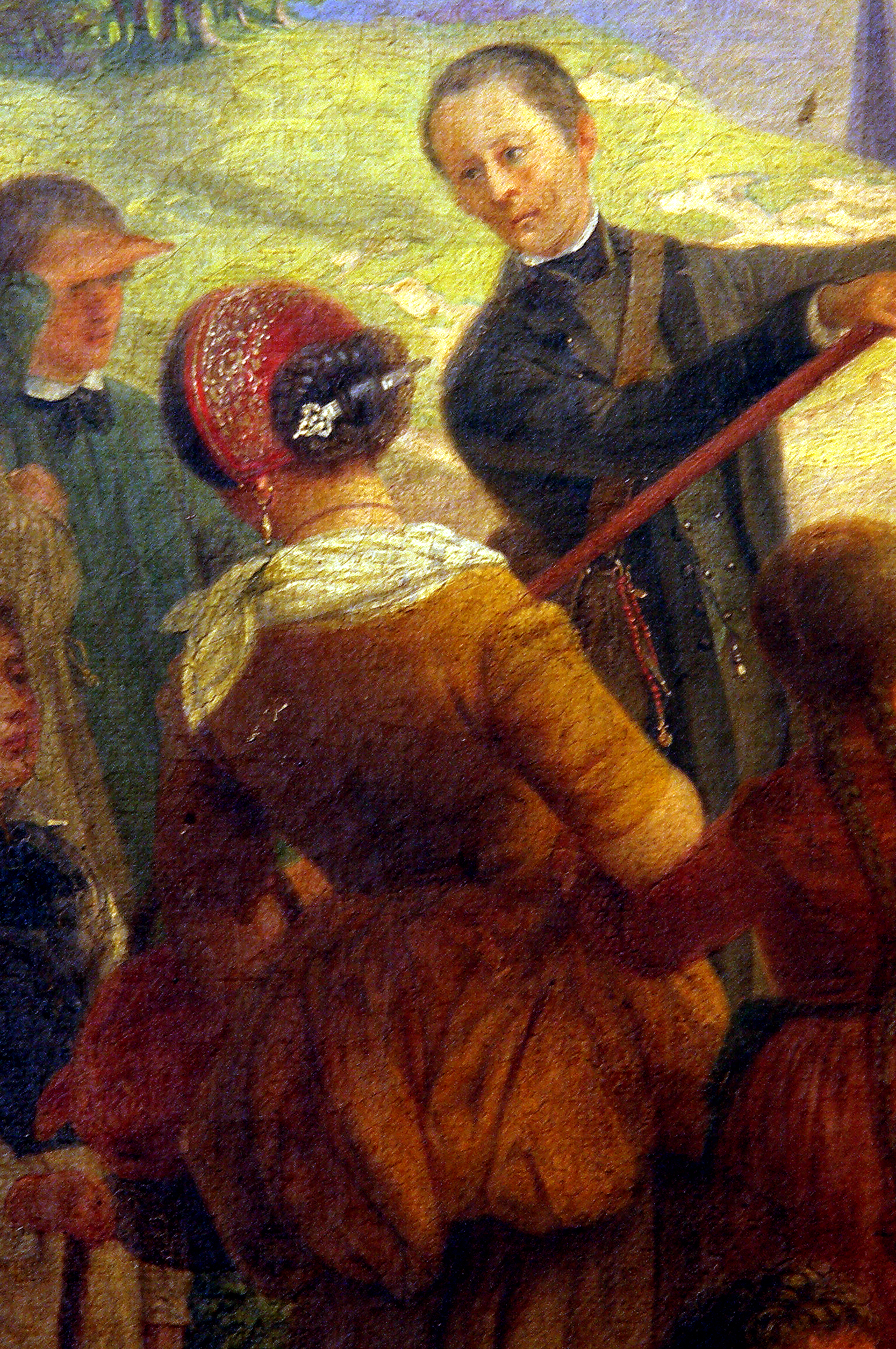
Headdress with arrow of virtue and its little cap; 1847

The children's toy yo-yo was nicknamed de Coblenz (Koblenz) in 18th century France, referring to the large number of noble French émigrées then living in the city.

The arrow of virtue (Tugendpfeil) is a large gold or silver hairpin from the female headdress of Koblenz and the left bank of the Rhine until the beginning of the 20th century. It was traditionally worn by young Catholic girls between puberty and marriage.

== Notable people ==
Largest groups of foreign residents
Nationality	Population (2017)
Turkey	1505
Poland	1,278
Bulgaria	996
Romania	780
Ukraine	627
Italy	613
Russia	600
Syria	595

- Thomas Anders (born 1963), singer, the lead singer of duo Modern Talking
- Cathinka Buchwieser (1789–1828), operatic soprano and actress
- Christian Collovà (born 1972), Italian rally driver
- Milo Emil Halbheer (1910–1978), artist
- Valéry Giscard d'Estaing (1926–2020), president of France from 1974 to 1981
- Otto Griebling (1896–1972), circus clown who performed with the Ringling Brothers
- Betty Hall (1921–2018), American politician
- Karl Haniel (1877–1944), civil servant and entrepreneur
- Ottilie von Hansemann (1840–1919), women's rights activist
- Bodo Illgner (born 1967), soccer player
- Philip Krautkremer (1844–1922), American farmer and politician
- Marty Krug (1888–1966), baseball player
- Max von Laue (1879–1960), physicist, won the Nobel Prize in Physics in 1914
- Tobias Lütke (born 1981), billionaire entrepreneur, founder and CEO of Shopify
- John A. Mais (1888–1961), racing driver
- Klemens von Metternich (1773–1859), Austrian diplomat, chancellor, and foreign minister, architect of the Congress of Vienna
- Johannes Peter Müller (1801–1858), physiologist, comparative anatomist, ichthyologist, and herpetologist
- Florian Siekmann (born 1985), politician (The Greens)
- Benedikt Oster (born 1988), politician (SPD)
- Peter Joseph Osterhaus (1823–1917), Major General in the United States Army during the American Civil War
