= Milo Emil Halbheer =

German painter

Milo or Milo Emil Halbheer (1910–1978) was a German painter.

He was born Emil Halbheer and raised in Koblenz, Germany. In 1930 he moved to Zürich, Switzerland, his father's hometown. In Zurich he studied to be a graphic artist and painter at the School of Arts and Crafts. In 1949 he opened his studio in La Garde-Freinet, France.

Milo painted scenes inspired by the "Maures", a mountain range in the Côte d'Azur region. He often painted images of the countryside in La Garde-Freinet, particularly emphasizing its old and striking chestnut trees, cork oaks, and olive trees. He also was known for his urban scenes, many based on his native town of Koblenz. His works were featured in numerous exhibitions in Switzerland, France, Germany, the United States, and Canada. In 1970 he was awarded the Gold Medal of the Grand Prix International de Provence. He died in Dietikon, Switzerland in 1978.

According to his profile at the Bel Art Gallery, Halbheer's work includes both Impressionist and Post-Impressionist elements, and may be usefully compared with that of Karl Schmidt-Rottluff and Paul Cézanne.

== Sources ==
- Bel Art Gallery profile
