= Philip Krautkremer =

American politician (1844–1922)

Philip Krautkremer (January 13, 1844 – May 23, 1922) was an American farmer and politician.

Krautkremer was born in Koblenz, Prussia (now Germany) and emigrated to the United States in 1851. He settled in Illinois, in 1851, and then moved to Helena, Scott County, Minnesota in 1857. Krautkremer lived with his wife and family in Helena, Minnesota was a farmer. He served in the Minnesota House of Representatives in 1879 and 1880.
