= Koblenz-Arzheim =

Coordinates: 50°21′18″N 7°37′57″E

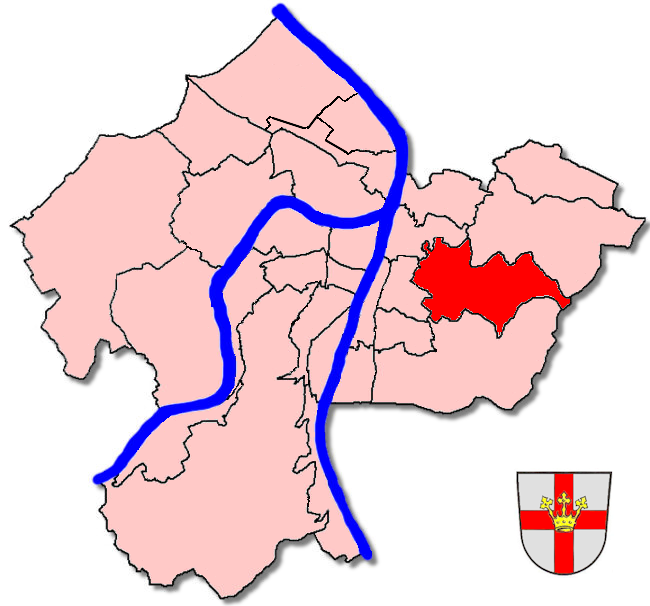
Koblenz-Arzheim
Basic Information
Suburb since:	1970
Area:	4,87 km²
Population:	2.217 (11.2006)
Population Density:	450 Inhabitants per km²
Post Code:	56077
Area Code:	0261
License Plate:	KO
Suburb
Mayor:	Josef Krämer

Since 1970 the village Arzheim has been incorporated into the jurisdiction of the city of Koblenz. Hence, the village of Arzheim is now being referred to as Koblenz-Arzheim. 2.200 people live in this suburb, in an area of 4,87km2.

In 2023, climate activists petitioned the city of Koblenz, in an effort to protect the old beech forest in Kolenz-Arzheim.

== History ==
Historical documents are proof, that the first mentioning of Arzheim has been in 868 A.D. However, excavations show that settlement in this area dates back to some time in B.C.

== Village life ==
Arzheim is well known in the surroundings of Koblenz for its many festivals where the whole community gathers. Most famous is the annual Kirmes (a type of fun fair involving drinking and dancing) in August and the Carnival in February.

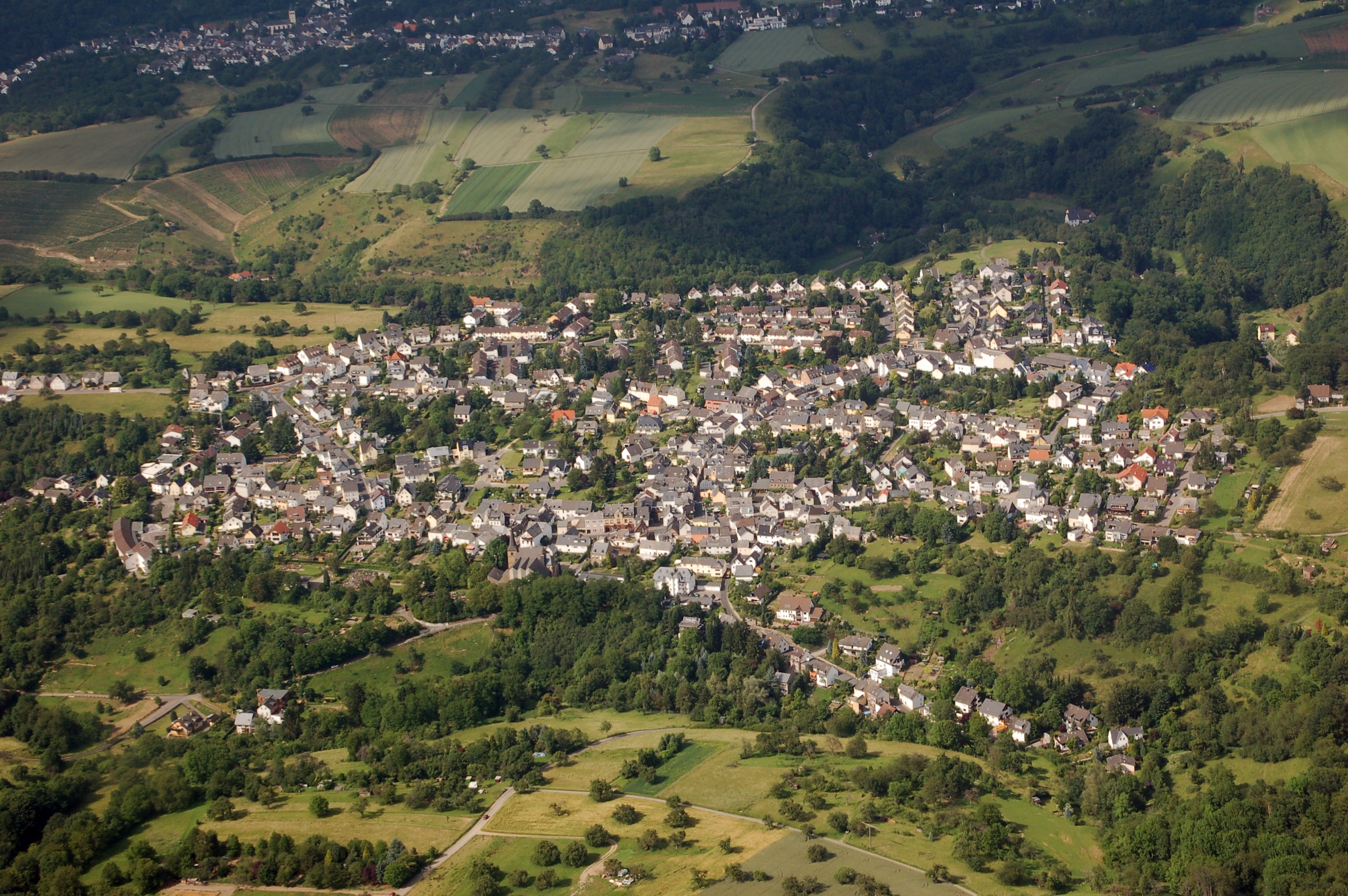
Aerial photograph 2007
