= Rheinsteig =

German hiking trail

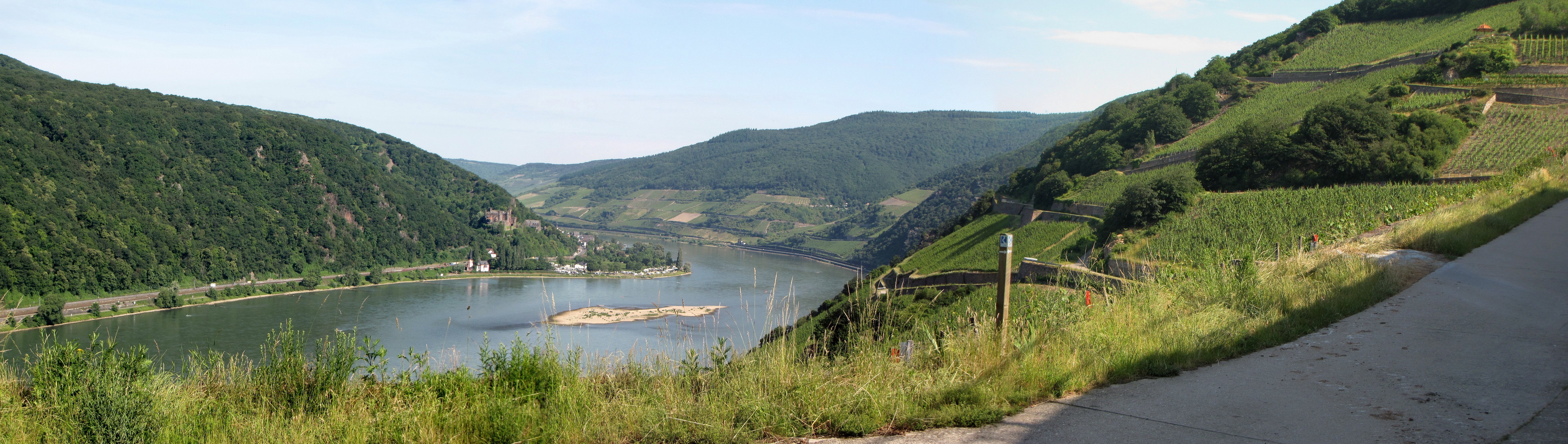
- View of the river Rhine
- Length: 320 km (200 mi)
- Location: Rhineland-Palatinate/Hesse/North Rhine-Westphalia, Germany
- Trailheads: Bonn, (Note: 50.73531°N 7.101930°E Bonn (Northern end)) Wiesbaden (Note: 50.037250520°N 8.234180450°E Wiesbaden (Southern end))
- Use: Hiking
- Elevation change: 9,500 m (31,200 ft)
- Highest point: Lykershausen, 351 m (1,152 ft)
- Lowest point: Kennedy Bridge, Bonn, 60 m (200 ft)
- Difficulty: Easy
- Season: All year
- Sights: Numerous castles along the Rhine Gorge and Siebengebirge. Vineyards of Rheingau. Woodland in Naturpark Rhein-Taunus.
- Hazards: Cyclists
- Website: www.rheinsteig.de

The Rheinsteig is a hiking trail following a mainly elevated path along the east bank of the Rhine River in Germany. Its 320 kilometres (200 mi) route stretches from Wiesbaden to Bonn, running parallel to the Rheinhöhenweg Trail and Rheinburgenweg Trail.

== Description ==
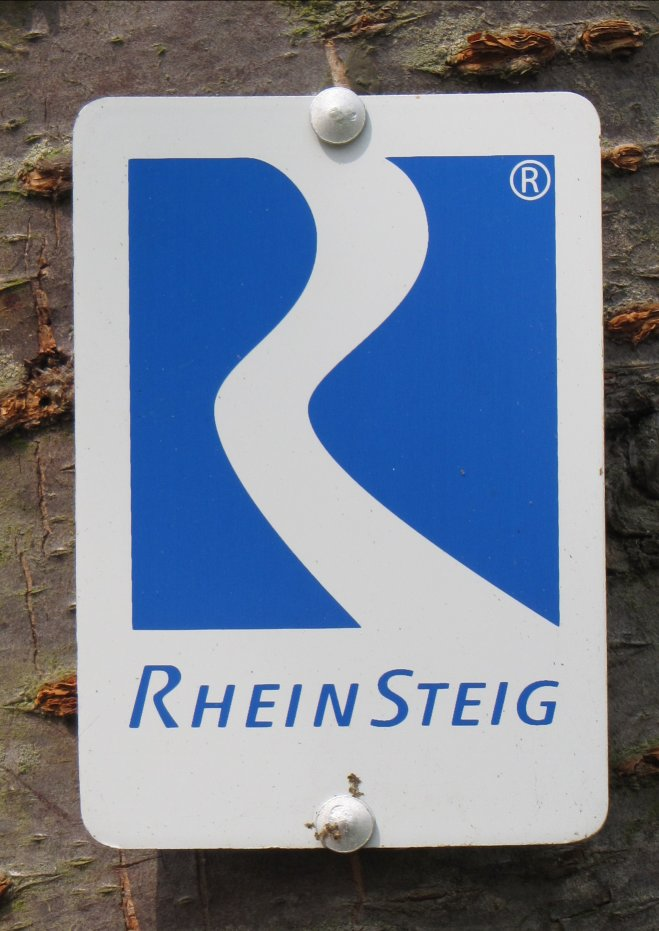
Rheinsteig trail marker

The Rheinsteig passes through woodlands and vineyards, and has challenging ascents and descents. It is signposted by signs with an 'R' on a blue background. The Rheinsteig allows either longer-distance hiking or a number of short tours.

== Route and sights of interest ==
- Wiesbaden-Biebrich, Schloss Biebrich, (Note: 50.0375°N 8.234167°E Schloss Biebrich) Wiesbaden-Schierstein, Goethestein, Burg Frauenstein, (Note: 50.065139°N 8.154583°E Burg Frauenstein) Wiesbaden-Frauenstein
- Schlangenbad, (Note: 50.094167°N 8.103333°E Schlangenbad) Burg Scharfenstein, Kiedrich,
- Eberbach Abbey (Kloster Eberbach), (Note: 50.0425°N 8.046667°E Eberbach Abbey) Steinberg, Schloss Vollrads
- Johannisberg (Geisenheim), Schloss Johannisberg,
- Marienthal Monastery, Eibingen Abbey,
- Rüdesheim am Rhein, Niederwalddenkmal, (Note: 49.980833°N 7.899722°E Niederwalddenkmal) Assmannshausen
- Lorch, Ruine Nollig, Burg Gutenfels (Note: 50.087806°N 7.765611°E Burg Gutenfels)
- Kaub, Dörscheid, Lorelei
- Sankt Goarshausen, Nochern, Burg Maus
- Kestert, Lykershausen, Burg Liebenstein, Burg Sterrenberg, (Note: 50.213417°N 7.633139°E Burg Sterrenberg) Filsen
- Osterspai, (Note: 50.245556°N 7.616111°E Osterspai) Marksburg
- Braubach
- Lahnstein, Oberlahnstein, Niederlahnstein, Lahneck Castle (Note: 50.306389°N 7.6125°E Lahneck Castle)
- Koblenz-Ehrenbreitstein, Ehrenbreitstein Fortress (Note: 50.365°N 7.615278°E Ehrenbreitstein Fortress)
- Vallendar
- Sayn (part of Bendorf)
- Rengsdorf
- Leutesdorf
- Rheinbrohl
- Leubsdorf, Linz am Rhein
- Unkel (Note: 50.600833°N 7.215°E Unkel)
- Bad Honnef, Drachenfels
- Königswinter
- Niederdollendorf
- Kennedy Bridge, (Note: 50.738167°N 7.110333°E Kennedy Bridge) Bonn

== Literature and maps ==
Opened on September 8, 2005, hikers can find maps and books giving information about where to join and leave the track, should hikers want to do just a short section.

Coordinate list

== Gallery ==
Rheinsteig

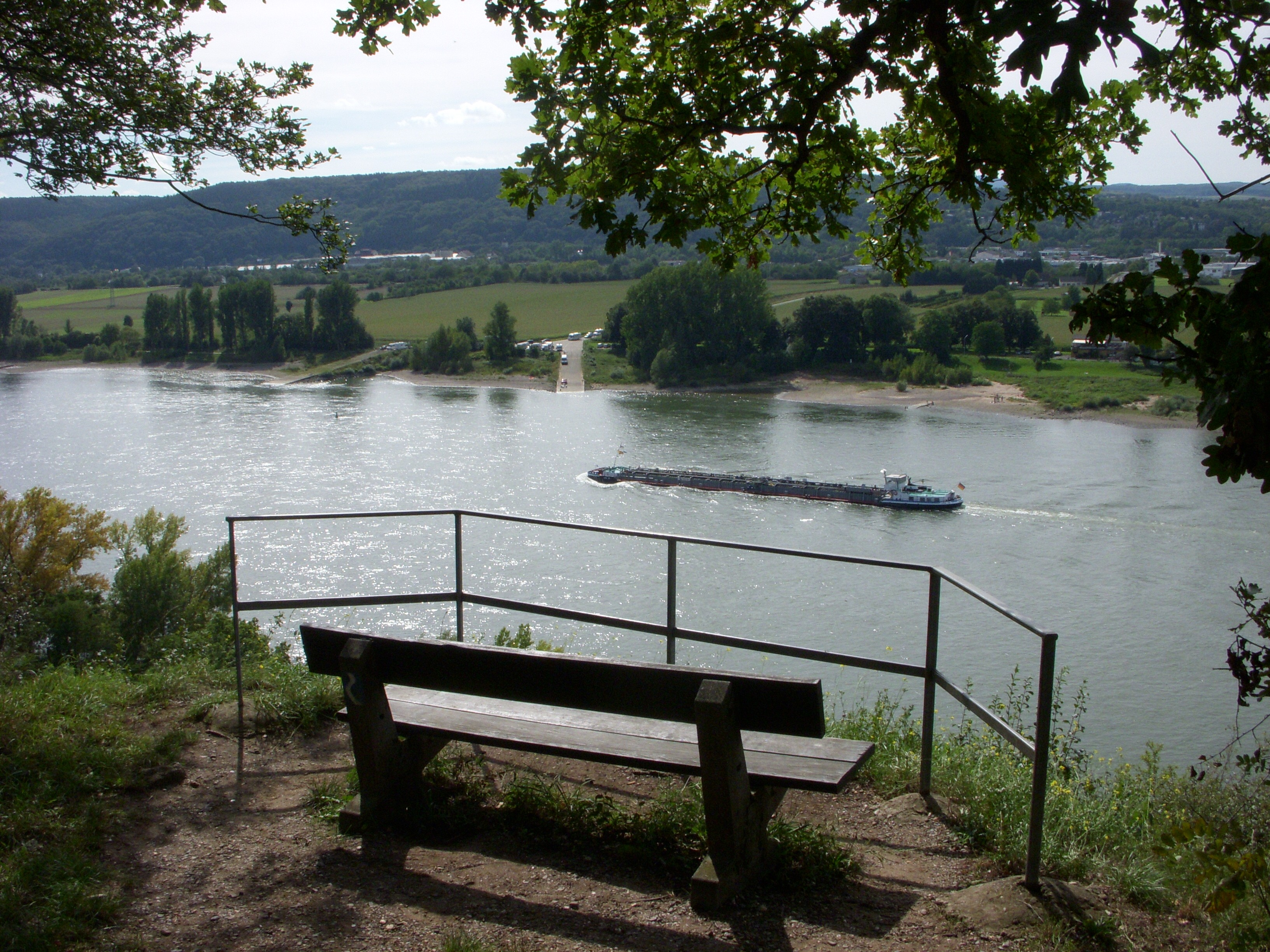

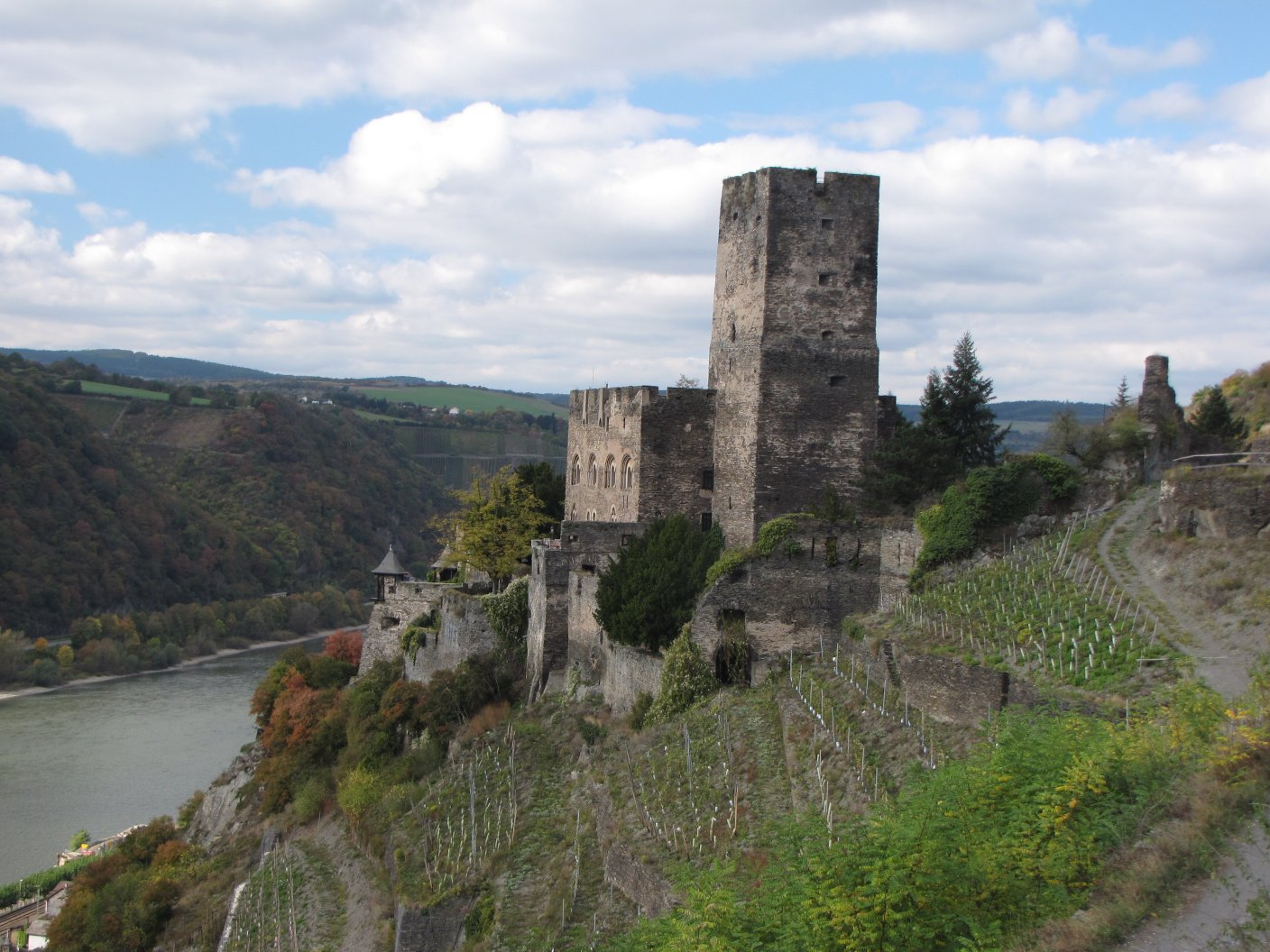

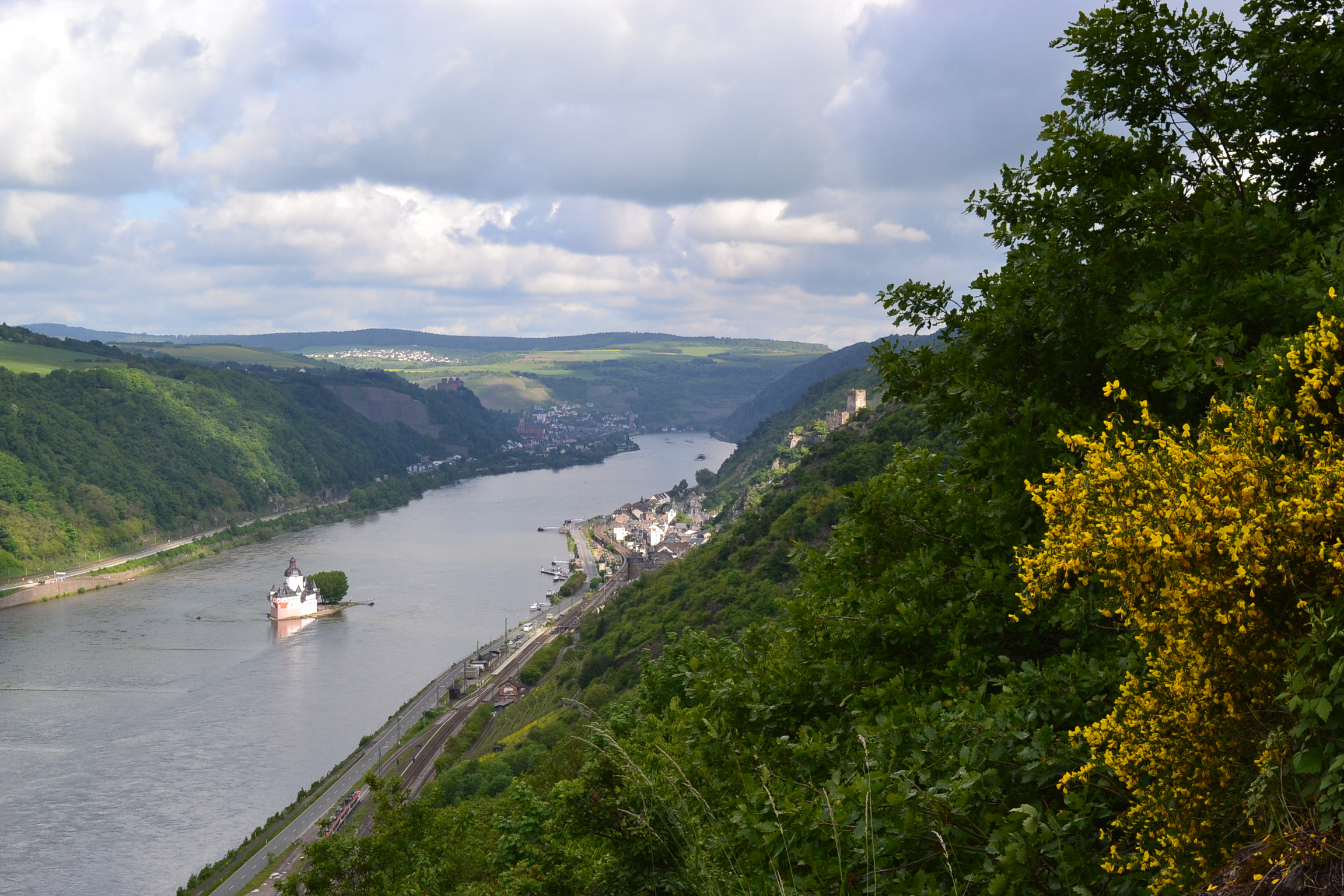

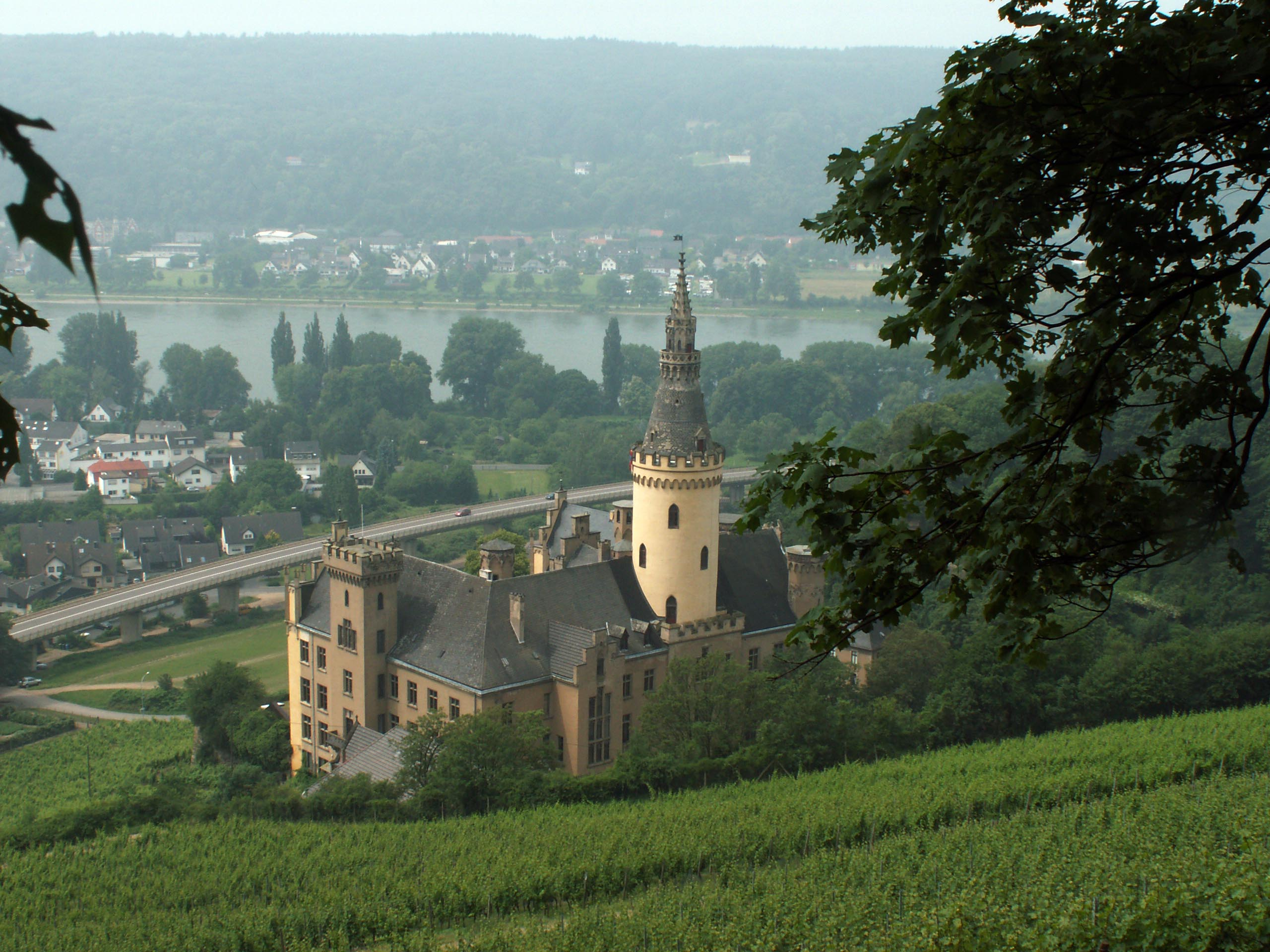
Arenfels castle

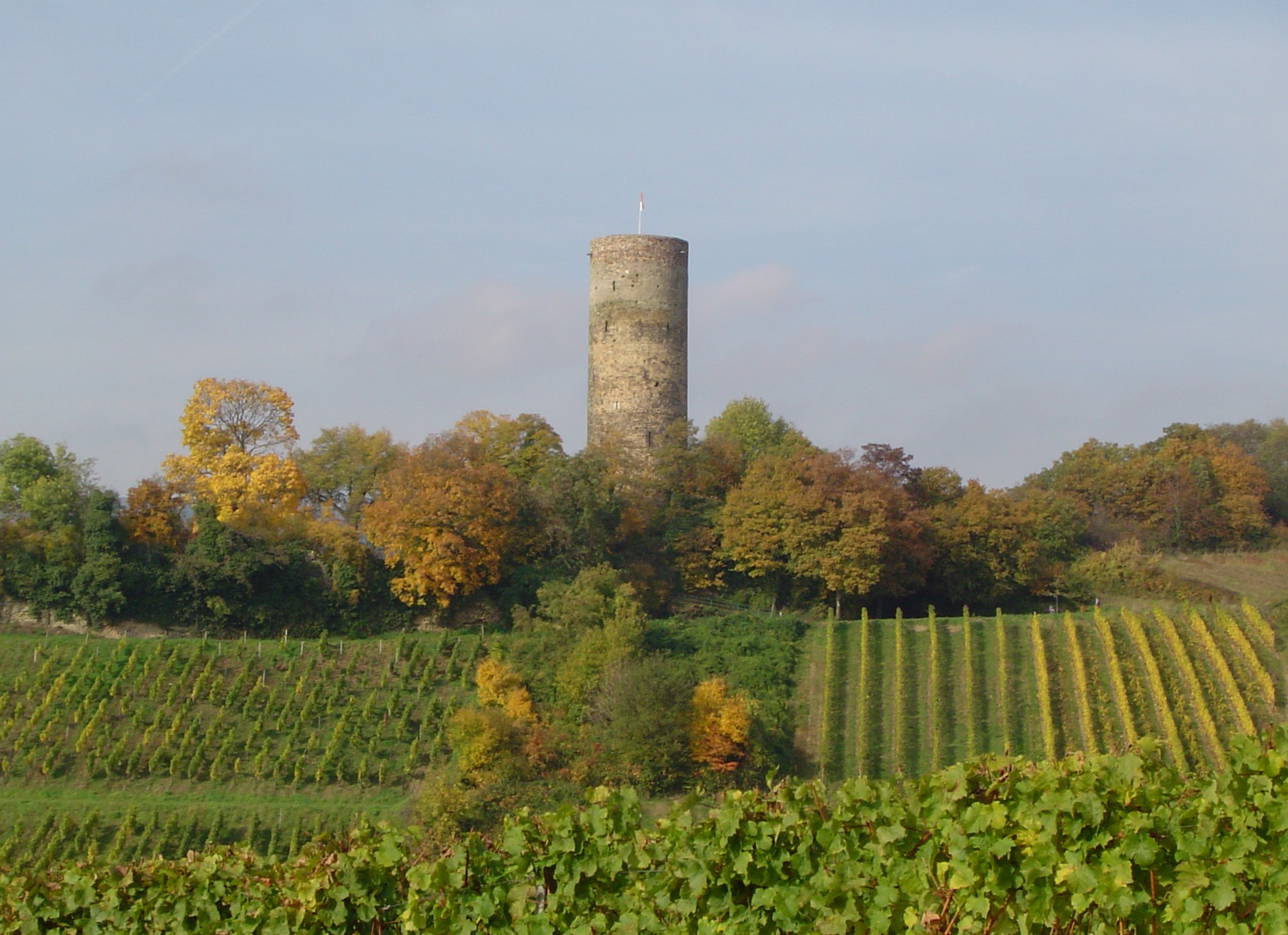

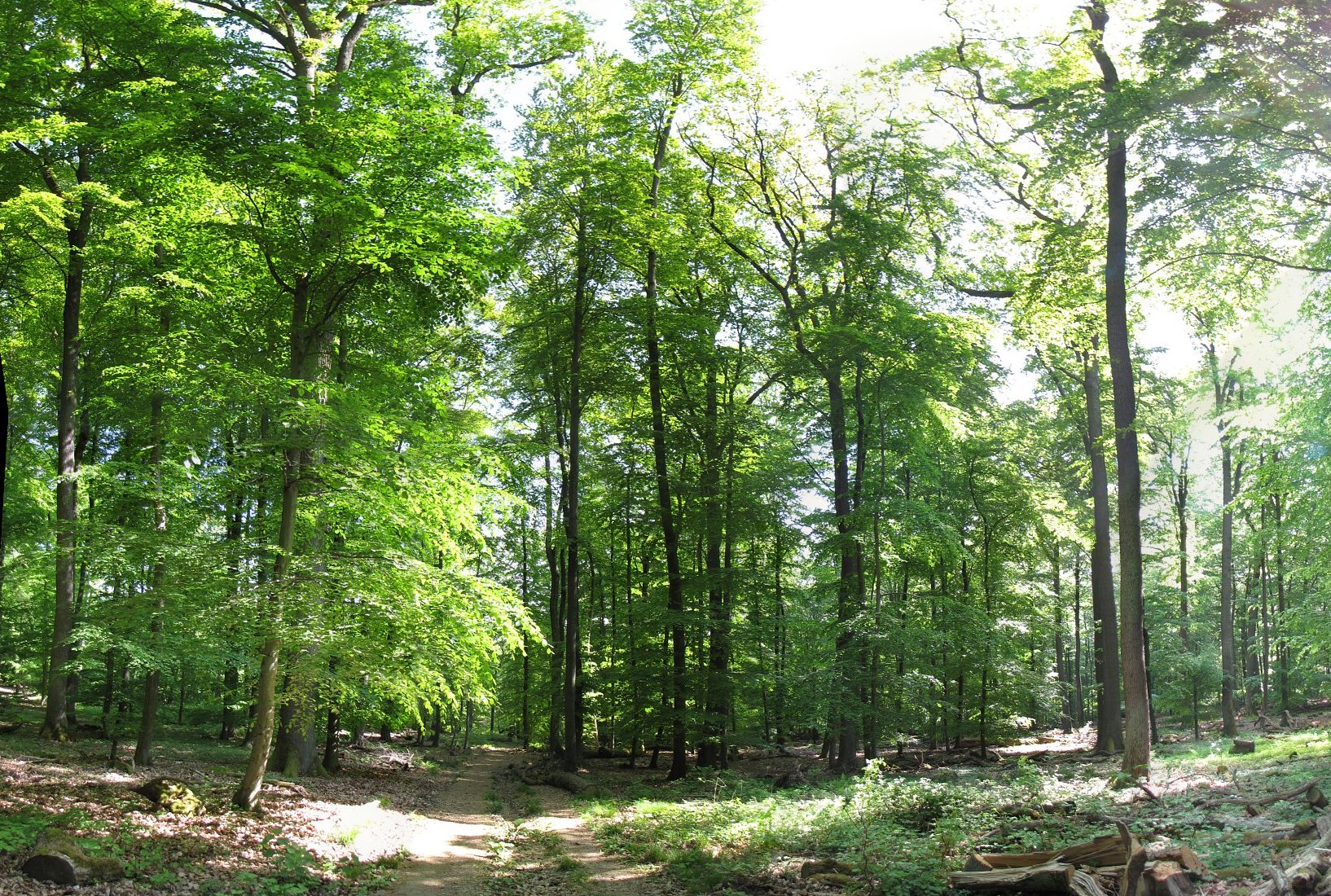
Honigberg near Kiedrich

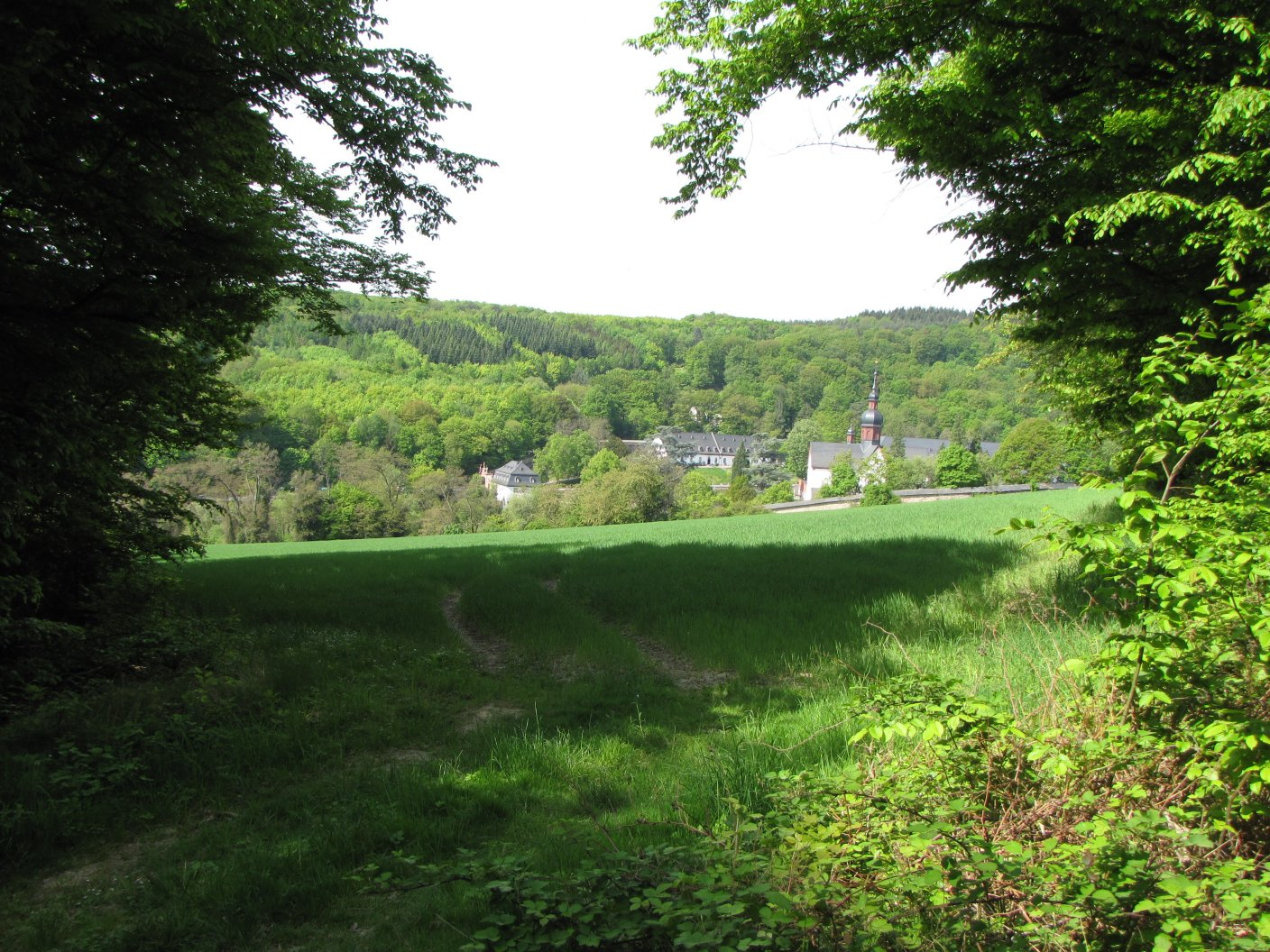
Eberbach Abbey

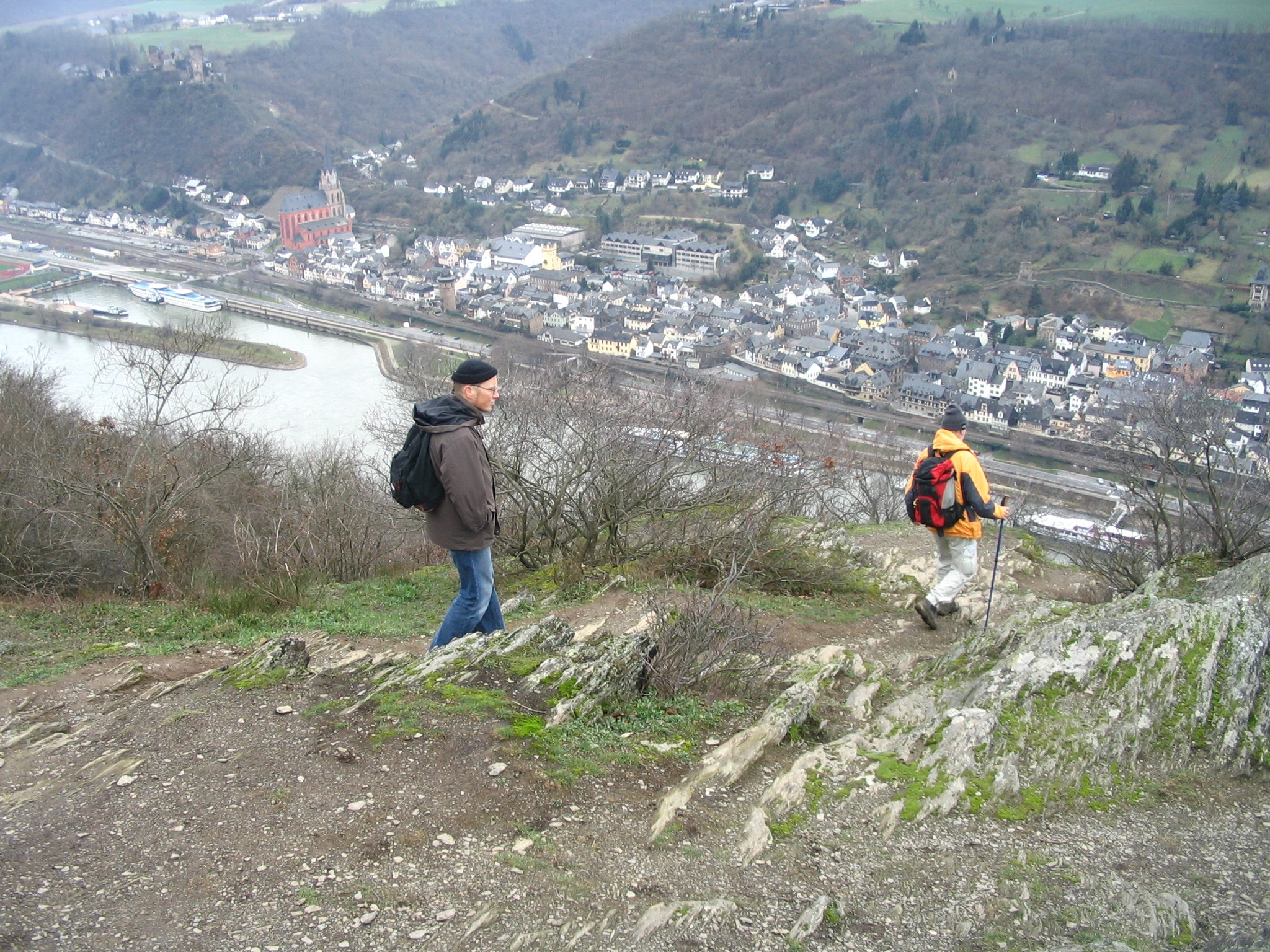
The Rheinsteig in winter, Roßstein between Kaub and St. Goarshausen, view of Oberwesel

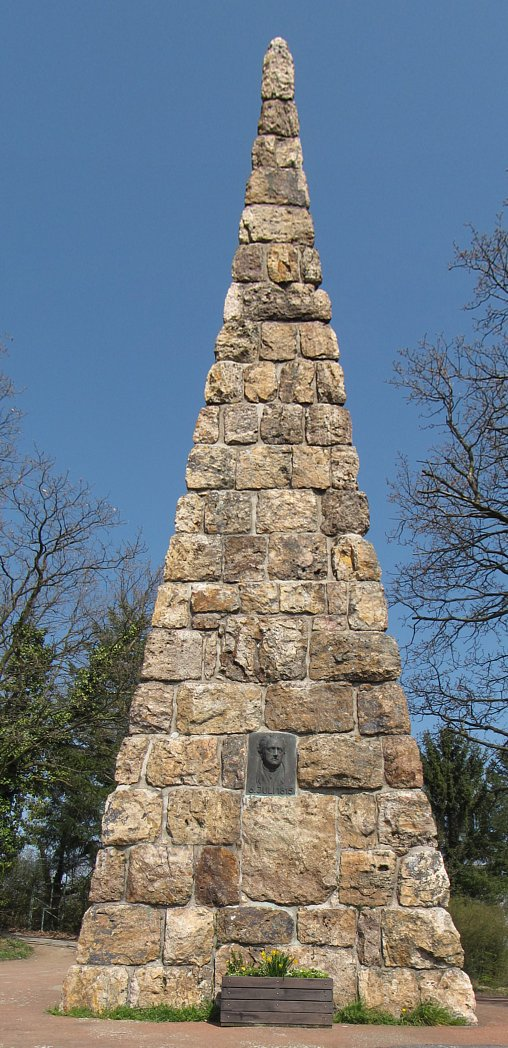
Goethestein, Wiesbaden-Frauenstein
