= Allerheiligen =

Allerheiligen (Dutch and German for All Saints) may refer to:

- Kloster Allerheiligen; see All Saints' Abbey (Baden-Württemberg)
- Allerheiligen im Mühlkreis, a municipality in Upper Austria, Austria
- Allerheiligen im Mürztal, a municipality in Styria, Austria
- Allerheiligen bei Wildon, a municipality in Styria, Austria
- Allerheiligenberg Monastery, a former Monastery in Lahnstein, Rhineland-Palatinate, Germany
- Kloster Allerheiligen, Schaffhausen, a monastery in Switzerland
