= Das Treibhaus =

1953 novel

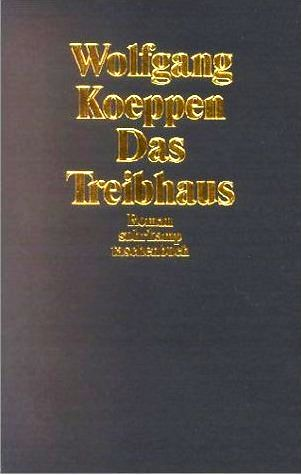
- Author: Wolfgang Koeppen
- Original title: Das Treibhaus
- Translator: Michael Hofmann (English)
- Language: German
- Series: Trilogy of Failure
- Genre: Political fiction, Literary fiction
- Publisher: Scherz & Goverts, W. W. Norton & Company (English)
- Publication date: 4 November 1953
- Publication place: Germany
- English publication date: 2001
- Media type: Print (hardcover, paperback)

Das Treibhaus (English: The Hothouse) is a 1953 novel by the German author Wolfgang Koeppen. It is the second work in what has become known as the "Trilogy of Failure", a series of three novels examining postwar West German society. Set during the Cold War and the debate over West German rearmament, the novel takes place largely in Bonn, the capital of the Federal Republic of Germany.

First published in Germany in 1953, the novel was not translated into English until 2001, when Michael Hofmann's translation was published by W. W. Norton & Company. The English translation was named a Notable Book by The New York Times and one of the Best Books of the Year by the Los Angeles Times.

== Plot ==
The protagonist is Felix Keetenheuve, a man in his mid-forties who worked as a journalist during the Weimar Republic and spent the Nazi period in exile, primarily in England, where he was employed making radio broadcasts to Germany. After 1945, he returned to Germany and became a member of the Bundestag for the SPD.

At the beginning of the novel, Keetenheuve travels by train to Bonn, where crucial votes on the Western integration of the young republic are scheduled to take place. He has just buried his young wife Elke, whose parents had committed suicide at the end of the war because her father had been a Gauleiter of the Nazi Party. Keetenheuve blames himself for neglecting Elke in favor of politics, which led to her alcoholism.

Keetenheuve is portrayed as an uncompromising intellectual, more attuned to the poetry of E. E. Cummings and Charles Baudelaire than to bourgeois life. Because of his exile, he serves as the figurehead of his party, yet he remains equally isolated within both his party and parliament. He despises the pragmatic work of parliamentarians and rejects party discipline, insisting on making decisions according to his own conscience. He observes former Nazi elites and fellow travelers returning to positions of power.

Keetenheuve is manipulated from multiple directions: by his parliamentary party leader Knurrewahn (a character representing Kurt Schumacher), who sends him into debate to maintain the party's pacifist facade while privately acknowledging they are not fundamentally opposed to rearmament; by the parliamentary majority and their almost authoritarian Chancellor (representing Konrad Adenauer), who sends an agent named Frost-Forestier (possibly representing Reinhard Gehlen) to offer Keetenheuve an ambassadorship to Guatemala to remove him as a troublesome element; and by a journalist colleague aligned with Western powers who passes him confidential material for use in his speech, while simultaneously providing it to the opposing side, thereby rendering Keetenheuve's speech worthless before he even delivers it.

At the end of the parliamentary debate, Keetenheuve knows he has lost. As on the previous evening, he wanders through the nocturnal city and eventually reaches the bridge over the Rhine. The novel ends with the sentence: "The delegate was completely useless, he was a burden to himself, and a jump from the bridge set him free."

=== Subplot ===
Keetenheuve's failure is also rooted in his private situation. After his wife's death, he has become unmoored. He becomes a victim of his impulses, which repeatedly draw him to very young women. Shortly before his death, Keetenheuve meets sixteen-year-old Lena, a refugee from Thuringia who is equally uprooted. In Thuringia, she had begun an apprenticeship as a mechanic and is baffled by the reactions to her "unfeminine" desire to pursue this profession in West Germany, where men mock and sexually harass her.

In her distress, she turns to Keetenheuve, together with Gerda, a Salvation Army soldier she met in the West. Keetenheuve wants to help Lena ("Keetenheuve a good person"), but considers it her "fate" that he will seduce her ("Keetenheuve a bad person"). When an attempted sexual encounter between them takes place on a bombed-out plot of land, the delegate becomes aware of the questionable nature of his existence. Immediately after this scene, he drowns himself.

== Title and setting ==
While Koeppen and many interpreters of his first novel in the trilogy, Pigeons on the Grass, insisted that "the city" should not simply be replaced with "Munich" (even though the local color of the Bavarian capital is easily recognizable), in Das Treibhaus it is clear that the action takes place in Bonn. The city's basin location in the Rhine Valley creates a literal "hothouse climate" that explains the book's title. The title also refers to the political landscape—the ghettoization of professional politicians in Bonn, who had already lost touch with reality and the populace just four years after the founding of the Federal Republic.

Scholars who have closely examined the novel point out that Wolfgang Koeppen depicted the third and final reading of the Germany Treaty and the European Defence Community Treaty on Thursday, 19 March 1953, and its particular accompanying circumstances. This would suggest that the narrated time of the novel spans this day and the day before. However, the full development of the hothouse effect requires that the novel be set primarily in summer, and many passages confirm high temperatures during the narrated time, which contradicts a March date.

This circumstance explains what Koeppen means when he says that "the novel has its own poetic truth" and should not be understood as a political roman à clef. Nevertheless, literary scholar Bernd W. Seiler criticizes Koeppen's attempt to prevent decoding: "What kind of imagination would a reader need to have who reads, for example, about a Chancellor of the Federal Republic of Germany 'who after years of annoying retirement was unexpectedly given the chance to go down in history as a great man,' who 'looks like a clever fox,' who in the Bundestag demands accession to the European Defence Community, etc.—and who does not identify this man with Adenauer? Is that even possible?"

Historian Kurt Sontheimer placed the literary figure of Keetenheuve on equal footing with the politicians Konrad Adenauer, Theodor Heuss, and Kurt Schumacher in his book Die Adenauer-Ära. He wrote: "Keetenheuve's encounter with Bonn politics reveals—aptly, albeit often pointedly—so many facets of the reality of political life in the German 'hothouse' that the novel is almost indispensable for understanding German politics in the Adenauer era. To this day, this literary portrait of the Adenauer period, focused on its restorative tendencies, has not been surpassed."

== Writing and publication history ==
The first notes and sketches for the novel date back to 1947. Concrete plans for writing developed only in 1951, after Koeppen's previous novel Pigeons on the Grass had been published. In early 1952, he informed his publisher Scherz & Goverts about his work on the new novel; the publisher showed interest and expected a manuscript by June of that year.

Koeppen delayed submission of the manuscript, which at that time had the working titles Ein Ölzweig auf ein Grab ("An Olive Branch on a Grave") and later Oelzweige auf ein Grab ("Olive Branches on a Grave"). He asked publisher Henry Goverts to arrange a trip to Bonn so he could gain a behind-the-scenes view of the Bonn Republic. In November 1952, Goverts and Koeppen still anticipated possible publication in spring 1953.

Due to illness, Koeppen had to interrupt his work on the novel, and the trip to Bonn was postponed until early February 1953. Goverts suggested that his friend Kuno Ockhardt, head of the press office at the Federal Ministry of Economics under Ludwig Erhard, accompany Koeppen on his Bonn visit. Koeppen expressed skepticism about this proposal in his letters to Goverts, fearing political influence.

After spending several days around 6 February 1953 exploring Bonn and the suburbs of Bad Godesberg and Mehlem and collecting material, Koeppen began writing the novel. In April and May, he rented a room in a Stuttgart bunker hotel - a former World War II bunker converted into a hotel beneath the marketplace. In this windowless room, he found the peace to complete the novel within a few weeks. According to scholarly analysis, he completed the novel in six weeks. His ideas for the title ranged from Die goldene Rose ("The Golden Rose"), Die politische Rose ("The Political Rose"), and Die künstliche Rose ("The Artificial Rose") to Im Treibhaus ("In the Hothouse") and finally Das Treibhaus.

In early June 1953, Koeppen delivered the finished manuscript to Scherz & Goverts. However, his fears that the novel might displease the political establishment and complicate publication proved justified: the publisher hesitated to publish the then-shocking work. Goverts suggested publishing the novel in the Rowohlt rororo paperback series instead. Since Rowohlt would only publish in its weaker main program and not until spring 1954, Koeppen decided to publish a revised version with Scherz & Goverts.

Koeppen instructed his editor Heinz Seewald to make some softening changes to the text, though Seewald did not follow all of Koeppen's suggestions. The revised manuscript went to press in September and October 1953 and was published on 4 November 1953 in an edition of approximately 12,000 copies. A second and third printing followed the same year. A paperback edition appeared in 1955, which made some cuts. Most later editions followed this abridged paperback version; whether Koeppen agreed to these textual interventions remains unclear.

== Literary style and allusions ==
The novel employs a stream of consciousness technique, similar to that used by James Joyce and Malcolm Lowry, making it difficult at times to distinguish between action and the protagonist's thoughts. Publishers Weekly praised the novel for its "dazzling prose, rich with allusions to classical and German literature."

Charles Baudelaire's poem "Le beau navire," published in 1857 in the poetry collection Les Fleurs du mal, plays a significant role as one of the novel's recurring motifs. Keetenheuve attempts to translate the poem in memory of his wife but, due to the course of events, never gets beyond the first few lines.

The death of the politician Keetenheuve strongly recalls the death of Georg Bendemann in Franz Kafka's story "The Judgment": Bendemann also kills himself at the end of the story by jumping from a busy bridge into a river after realizing that he has lived his life wrongly.

== Critical reception ==
Upon publication, the novel was highly controversial in Germany. Former Chancellor Helmut Schmidt once declared that no book had ever "annoyed" him as much as Das Treibhaus. The aggressive reactions at the time amused Koeppen, who stated that "the novel arose from the horror of the Hitler era, the fear that something like it could happen again."

The novel gradually gained recognition as a classic of postwar German literature. Literary critic Marcel Reich-Ranicki stated: "Those who haven't read this novel cannot claim to know German literature after 1945." Günter Grass called Koeppen "Germany's greatest living writer."

When the English translation appeared in 2001, it received widespread critical acclaim. Publishers Weekly gave it a starred review, calling it "almost eerily contemporary in its concerns, and remarkable as a sidelong, searing appraisal of the legacy of the Nazi years, it is a recovered masterpiece." Kirkus Reviews described it as "a rediscovered masterpiece" and "a meticulously observed chronicle" featuring "spectacular stream-of-consciousness passages."

The Wall Street Journal noted that translator "Hofmann has rendered this difficult novelist's richness of observation, insight and verbal elan into vibrant prose." Nadine Gordimer called the novel "scathingly beautiful...it is lyrically inescapable." The Independent praised Michael Hofmann's translation: "In a brilliant translation of this great German novel, Michael Hofmann has illuminated a dark corner of recent European history. A forgotten masterpiece." The Frankfurter Allgemeine Zeitung wrote: "The Hothouse is literature of a quality that is not often attained."

The Times Literary Supplement observed that "the whorl of Koeppen's fragments is always steeled by his precision and capacity for revelation, and each word in Hofmann's translation feels fixed in place as though it were a mortared brick." Writer Pankaj Mishra noted that "Wolfgang Koeppen, a remorselessly brilliant German writer of the twentieth century, has long remained scandalously obscure in the Anglophone world."

== Adaptations ==
=== Film ===
In 1987, the novel was adapted into a film of the same name directed by Peter Goedel. The film was nominated for the German Film Award for Outstanding Feature Film.

Cast and crew
Role	Name
Director, Writer, Producer	Peter Goedel
Cinematography	David Slama
Film editing	Peter Goedel, Christiane Jahn
Music	Richard Wagner (from Das Rheingold)
Keetenheuve	Christian Doermer
Elke	Laila-Florentine Freer
Frost-Forestier	Jörg Hube
Mergentheim	Hanns Zischler
Knurrewahn	Otto A. Buck
Self	Wolfgang Koeppen

The film incorporates documentary elements including an interview with Koeppen himself and historical newsreel footage. It uses music from Richard Wagner's Das Rheingold and attempts to draw connections between the 1950s setting and political events of the late 1980s.

=== Stage ===
In 2008, the novel was adapted into a stage drama by Frank Heuel and Stephanie Gräve and performed with considerable success by the Bonn Municipal Theatre (Theater Bonn).

== See also ==
- Vergangenheitsbewältigung
- Adenauer era
