= Niederlahnstein station =

Railway station in Lahnstein, Germany

Niederlahnstein
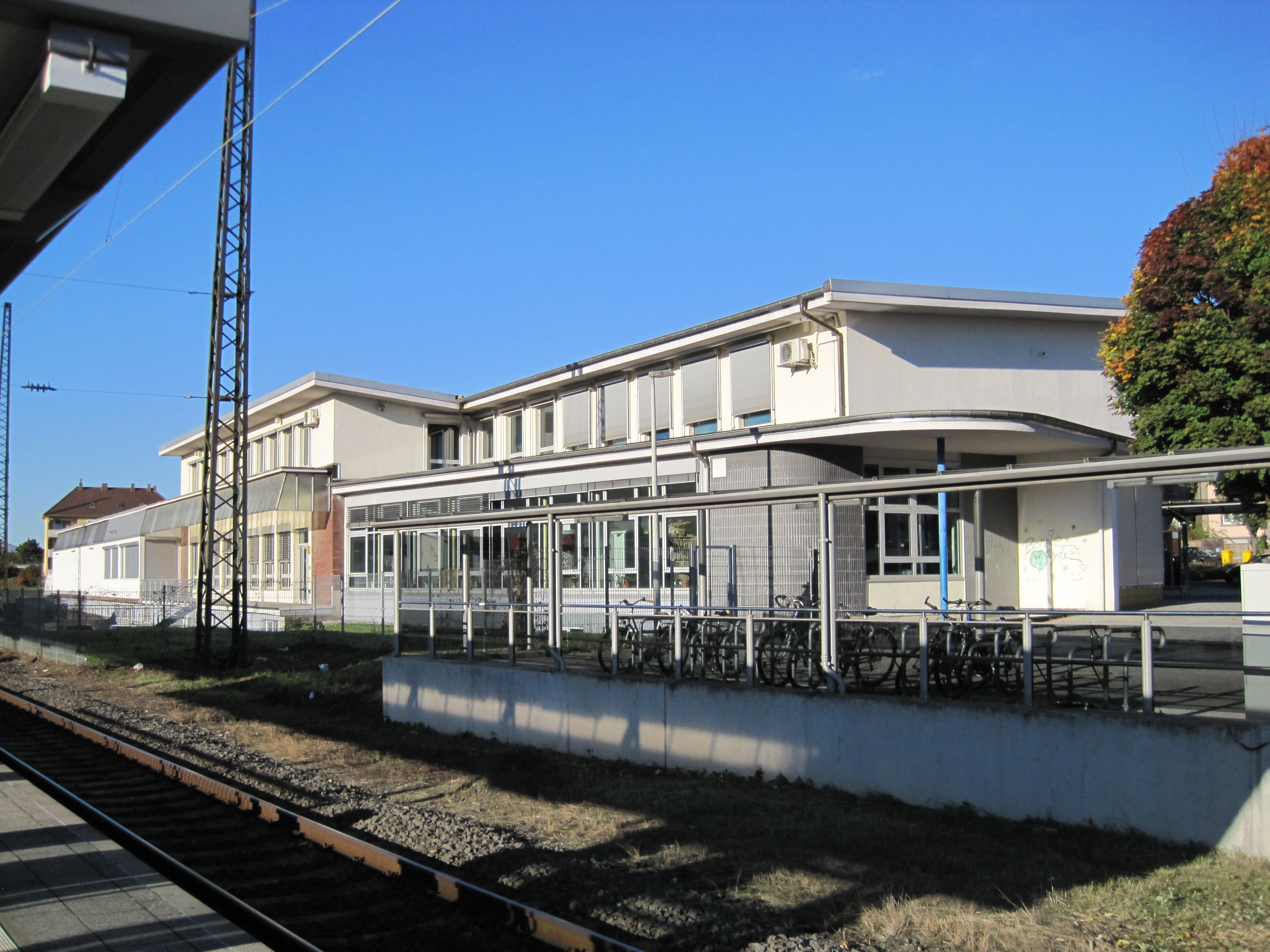

General information
- Location: Koblenzer Str. 1, Lahnstein, Rhineland-Palatinate; Germany
- Coordinates: 50°19′01″N 7°35′59″E
- Lines: East Rhine Railway (123.8 km); Lahn Valley Railway (99.2 km)
- Platforms: 4 (previously 6)

Construction
- Accessible: Yes

Other information
- Station code: 3360
- DS100 code: KNL
- IBNR: 8000278
- Category: 4
- Fare zone: VRM: 501
- Website: www.bahn.de

History
- Opened: 3 June 1864; 162 years ago

Services
Preceding station	DB Regio Mitte	Following station
Koblenz Hbf Terminus	RE 25	Bad Ems towards Gießen
Koblenz Hbf towards Mayen Ost	RB 23	Friedrichssegen towards Limburg (Lahn)
Preceding station	VIAS	Following station
Koblenz Hbf towards Neuwied	RB 10	Oberlahnstein towards Frankfurt (Main) Hbf
Location

Niederlahnstein station is, along with Oberlahnstein and Friedrichssegen, one of three stations in the town of Lahnstein in the German state of Rhineland-Palatinate. It is a separation station on the East Rhine Railway (German: Rechte Rheinstrecke) and the Lahn Valley Railway and is located in the Niederlahnstein district and forms a public transport hub for the Rhine-Mosel-Lahn area.

== History ==
The Nassau Rhine Railway Company (Nassauische Rhein Eisenbahn-Gesellschaft) opened in 1856, the first section of the Nassau Rhine Railway (Nassauische Rheinbahn) from Wiesbaden to Rudesheim, which was authorised in 1853. Due to financial and technical difficulties, the line was not opened to Oberlahnstein until 1862. It was extended to Niederlahnstein on 3 June 1864. There, the Rhine Railway ran over the Pfaffendorf Bridge to Koblenz to connect with the West Rhine Railway (Linke Rheinstrecke) of the Rhenish Railway Company (Rheinische Eisenbahn-Gesellschaft). A train ferry had connected Oberlahnstein and Königsbach in order to connect the two lines for two years from the second half of 1862. The extension of the Nassau Rhine Railway from Niederlahnstein to Neuwied was opened on 27 October 1869.

With the annexation of Duchy of Nassau by Prussia as a result of the Austro-Prussian War of 1866 and the subsequent absorption of the Nassau State Railway, including the Lahn Valley Railway by the Prussian state railways, a direct connection was opened on 15 May 1879 from Niederlahnstein to the Lahn Valley Railway near Friedrichssegen. In 1878/79, the Horchheim rail bridge was opened to the south of Koblenz to connect the east and west Rhine lines. Thus, the direct connection was built from Niederlahnstein to Koblenz. In the same period, the station received a new entrance building.

At the end of the Second World War, the station was the target of Allied air raids on 26 December 1944 and the station building was completely destroyed. After the Niederlahnstein–Hohenrhein section of the Lahn Valley Railway was destroyed in the Second World War it was rebuilt as a single-track line. Around 1960, the entire East Rhine Railway from Cologne to Wiesbaden was electrified.

During the introduction of the interim Rhineland-Palatinate integrated regular-interval timetable (Rheinland-Pfalz-Taktes) between early June 2004 and early November 2009, Niederlahnstein station was made a pilot project of Rhineland-Palatinate to convert it into an "environmental station". The core of the concept was the upgrading of the platforms to make them barrier-free. This involved the building of three passenger lifts to the platforms. In addition, new platform canopies, bicycle parking, short-term parking and a new pedestrian underpass as an entry to the station were built. The municipality of Lahnstein was commissioned to carry out the redevelopment of the station forecourt. The total construction cost of the project was €5.4 million.

In December 2007, an electronic interlocking was commissioned on the Right Rhine line. In the summer of 2008, the second phase of the project was completed and the Oberlahnstein–Niederlahnstein section was connected to the electronic interlocking system.

In 2007, services on the Frankfurt-Koblenz section were tendered Europe-wide by the Rhein-Main-Verkehrsverbund (Rhine-Main Transport Association, RMV) and the Zweckverband Schienenpersonennahverkehr Rheinland-Pfalz Nord (Rail Transport Association of Rhineland-Palatinate North, SPNV). As a result, VIAS GmbH took over operations between Neuwied, Koblenz, Wiesbaden and Frankfurt under the 2010/2011 timetable on 12 December 2010.

=== Depot ===
A locomotive depot (Bahnbetriebswerk) with a turntable was formerly attached to Niederlahnstein station. It was disbanded as an independent agency in August 1952.

== Platforms ==
Niederlahnstein station has an extensive layout of tracks. Four platform tracks next to two island platforms serve passenger traffic. There is no “home” platform next to the station building.

The numbering begins on the west side of the station building.

- Track 2 is a through track and the main track for the Lahn Valley Railway and shares an island platform with track 3. Today, trains of Vectus Verkehrsgesellschaft operate as line RB 25 and the Lahntalexpress (RE 25) towards Koblenz Hbf.
- Track 3 is a through track and is located on the island platform next to track 2. Today, it is used by trains towards Limburg and Gießen.
- Track 4 is a through track of the East Rhine Railway. It shares another island platform with track 5. Today, it is used by VIAS trains to Koblenz Hbf and Neuwied.
- Track 5 is another through track and is located on the island platform next to track 4. It is used by VIAS trains to Frankfurt Hbf via Rüdesheim and Wiesbaden Hbf.
- Track 6 was formerly a through track without a platform, which was used by freight. There is now a buffer stop on this track approximately in the middle of the station, making this track usable from Niederlahnstein to Koblenz.
- Track 7 is usable for through freight trains. During the recent rebuilding of the station access to the former island platform, which was formerly also used by track 8, was removed.
- Track 8, like track 7, is usable only for freight traffic.

== Rail services ==
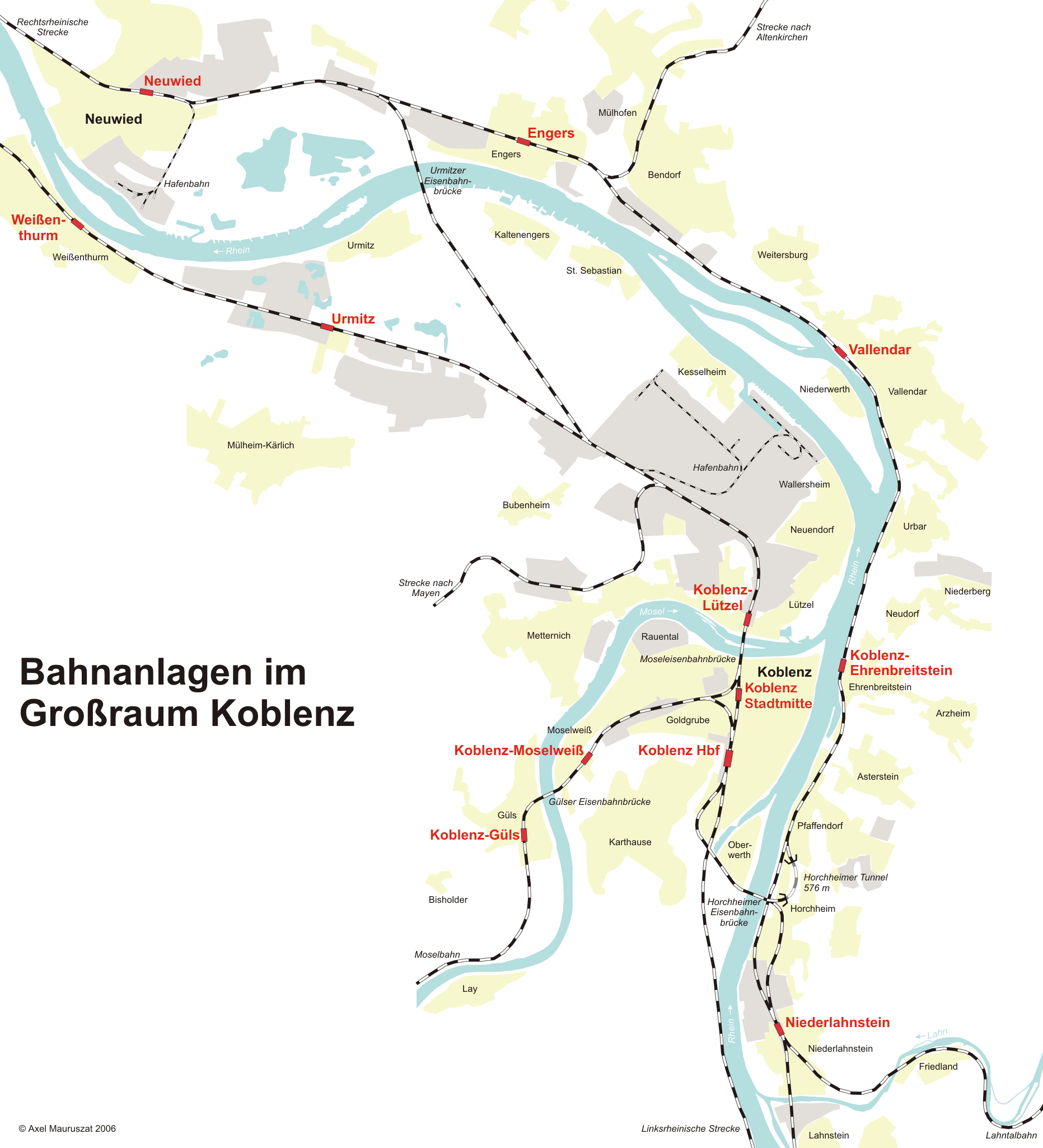
Railways in greater Koblenz

All local trains (Regional-Express and Regionalbahn) running on the two lines serving the station stop here. Freight and some long-distance trains pass through the station without stopping.

The southern section of the East Rhine Railway (Koblenz–Wiesbaden–Frankfurt) was served until the beginning of the 2010/2011 timetable in December 2010 by the Loreley-Bahn (RB 10) and the Loreley-Express (RE 10), which were operated by Deutsche Bahn (DB). As the result of a Europe-wide tender, services since 12 December 2010 have been operated as a single Regionalbahn service every hour, sometimes even every half hour, by VIAS GmbH, using new Stadler FLIRT sets.

After the change to the 2004/2005 timetable on 12 December 2004, diesel multiple units were operated on the Lahn Valley Railway as RB 23 by Vectus between Koblenz Hbf and Limburg (Lahn), usually hourly. In addition there was a Regional-Express service (RE 25) that ran between Koblenz Hbf, Limburg and Gießen. Both these services have been operated by DB Regio Südwest and marketed as the Lahn-Eifel-Bahn since the timetable change in December 2014. The Regionalbahn service has been extended from Koblenz to Mayen Ost.

Line	Service	Route	Frequency
RB 10	RheingauLinie	Neuwied – Koblenz – Niederlahnstein – Wiesbaden – Frankfurt	60 mins, every 30 mins in the peak Koblenz–Frankfurt
RB 23	Lahn-Eifel-Bahn	Koblenz – Niederlahnstein – Limburg – Weilburg – Wetzlar – Gießen	60 mins
RE 25	Lahn-Eifel-Bahn	Mayen Ost – Andernach – Koblenz – Niederlahnstein – Bad Ems – Diez – Limburg	120 mins
