= Lahnstein =

- Town
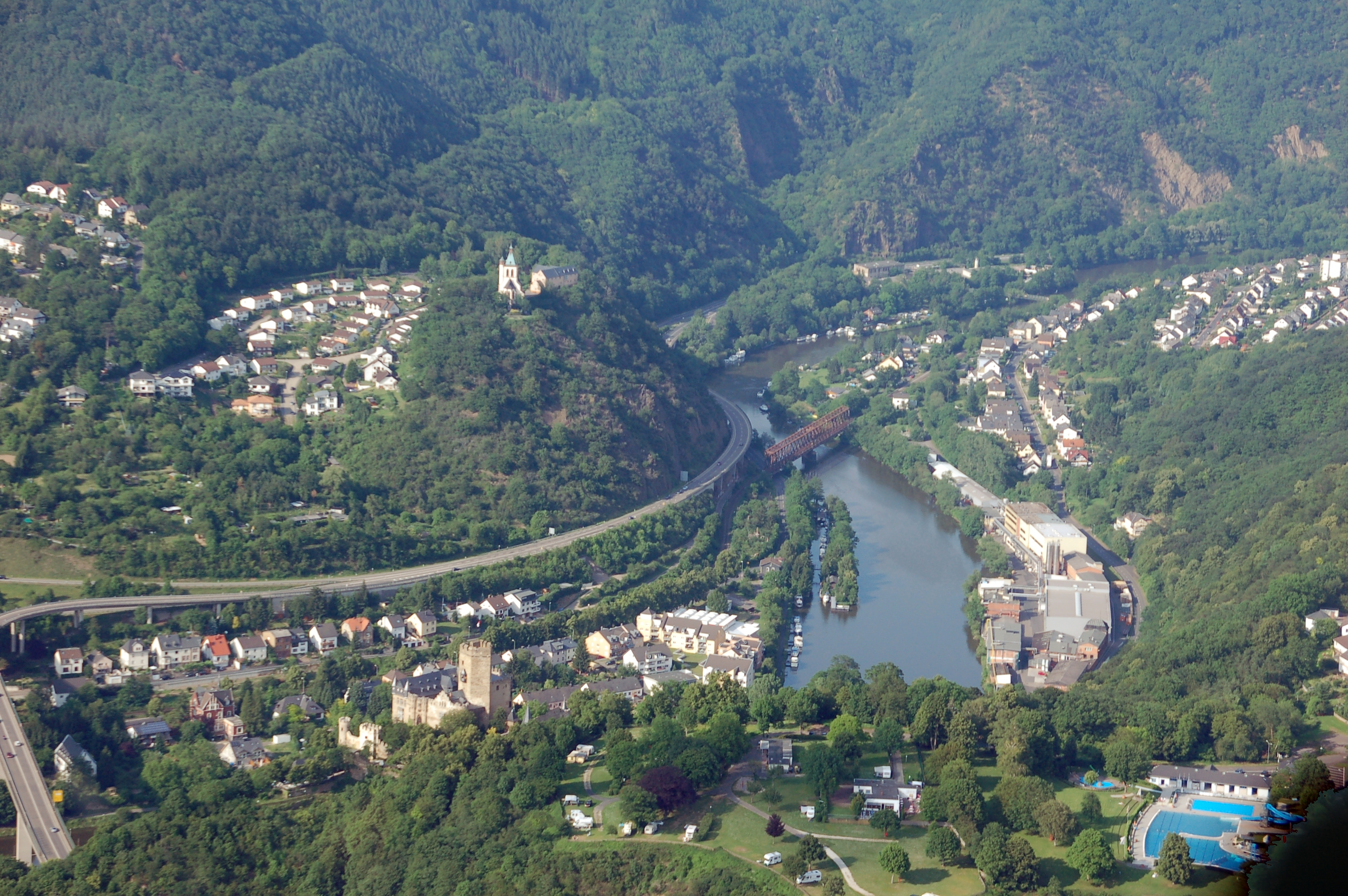
- Lahnstein and the Lahn Valley

- Coat of arms

- Location of Lahnstein within Rhein-Lahn-Kreis district
- Interactive map of Lahnstein
- Location within Germany Location within Rhineland-Palatinate
- Coordinates: 50°18′04″N 7°36′20″E
- Country: Germany
- State: Rhineland-Palatinate
- District: Rhein-Lahn-Kreis
- Subdivisions: Oberlahnstein and Niederlahnstein

Government
  - Mayor (2021–29): Lennart Siefert

Area
  - Total: 37.62 km^{2} (14.53 sq mi)
- Elevation: 74 m (243 ft)

Population (2025-12-31)
  - Total: 18,887
  - Density: 502.0/km^{2} (1,300/sq mi)
- Time zone: UTC+01:00 (CET)
  - Summer (DST): UTC+02:00 (CEST)
- Postal codes: 56112
- Dialling codes: 02621
- Vehicle registration: EMS, DIZ, GOH
- Website: www.lahnstein.de

Lahnstein (German pronunciation: [ˈlaːnʃtaɪn]) is a verband-free town of Rhein-Lahn-Kreis in Rhineland-Palatinate, Germany. It is situated at the confluence of the Lahn with the Rhine, approximately 6 kilometres (3.7 mi) south of Koblenz. Lahnstein was created in 1969 by the merger of the previously independent towns of Oberlahnstein (or Upper Lahnstein) on the south side of the Lahn (above the river mouth) and Niederlahnstein on the north side (below the river mouth). In 2020, it had a population of 18,030.

Situated on the heights of the foothills of the Westerwald and the Taunus, Lahnstein is considered a fresh-air spa city with spa facilities and thermal baths. It is also the seat of a district court. In religious affairs, it is assigned to the Roman Catholic Diocese of Limburg and to the Evangelical Church in Hesse and Nassau.

Because of its strategic importance on the Rhine, Lahnstein was heavily fortified. Many old gates and towers still demonstrate its importance in the Middle Ages. Lahneck Castle, situated high above Oberlahnstein, was built between 1240 and 1245 and served as a residence of the Archbishop-Electors of Mainz. Other sights in Lahnstein include Martinsburg Castle on the bank of the Rhine in Oberlahnstein, the Allerheiligenbergkapelle, St. John's Abbey (Johanneskloster), and the Rheinsteig hiking trail.

== Geography ==
=== Transport ===
- Rail

Lahnstein is located on the right side of the Rhine line and the Lahntal railway. Lahnstein has three railway stations, Oberlahnstein, (Environmental Train Station) Niederlahnstein and Friedrichssegen.

- Road

Lahnstein is connected on the right side of the Rhine with the Federal Roads 42 and 260.

- Bridges

The Lahn Lahn Valley can be crossed by the Lahn bridge (B 42), Rudi Geil Bridge between Ober- and Niederahnstein, the Lahn bridge Friedrichssegen and two railway bridges.

- Waterways

Rhineships dock on in Oberlahnstein and Niederlahnstein

=== Climate ===
The annual rainfall is 673 mm. The rainfall is in the middle third of the recorded values in Germany. The driest month is February, the wettest June. In June fall 2.1 times more rainfall than in February. The rainfall varies moderately.

== History ==
=== Early history ===
Based on archeological evidence, settlement in Lahnstein dates to the Late Stone Age (4000 to 1800 BC), continuing through the Bronze Age and Iron Age.

Around c. 369–370 AD, the Romans built a burgus (or watch tower) at the mouth of the Lahn on the site of present-day Niederlahnstein. It served the Rhine border fortifications and acted as a sentry for the fortress at Koblenz (Latin: Castellum apud Confluentes). It was this tower made of stone, which was called the "fortified house on the Lahn" (Latin: domus fortis supra Lonetam) in the Middle Ages, that gave the town its name. Traces of the Roman Limes Germanicus, the border fortifications built to safeguard the Empire from the Germanic tribes, still exist today about 8 km (5 mi) from the town in the Oberlahnstein city forest.

=== Medieval history ===
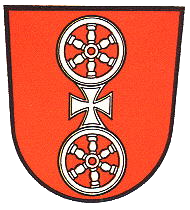
Coat of arms of Oberlahnstein before 1969, with the Wheel of Mainz

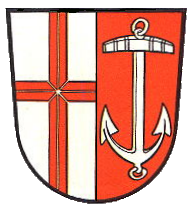
Coat of arms of Niederlahnstein before 1969, with the Cross of Trier

In the Carolingian Empire, the Lahn formed the border between two provinces (or gaus). Niederlahnstein belonged to the Engersgau, while Oberlahnstein was part of the Rheingau.

Around 900 AD, the Frankish Salhof of Oberlahnstein came into the possession of the Archbishopric of Mainz. Under Archbishop Siegfried III of Eppstein, Mainz acquired the rest of town of Oberlahnstein in 1220. The documents also mention a nearby silver mine at a Diefendal Mountain. Siegfried had Lahneck Castle built in 1226 to protect these territories, which were Mainz's northernmost exclave (in religious matters, Oberlahnstein was under the Archbishopric of Trier).

In 1298, Mainz built a customs castle on the Rhine in Oberlahnstein. In 1324 Holy Roman Emperor Louis the Bavarian gave Oberlahnstein town rights. The construction of the town fortifications dates to this time.

In 1018, the Castle "Lohenstein/Logenstein/Lainstein" (the former Roman burgus) at Niederlahnstein came into the possession of the Archbishopric of Trier. Niederlahnstein received town rights in 1322. In 1348, the Archbishopric of Trier built a customs tower there on the Lahn.

On 4 June 1400, King Wenceslaus of Germany was called by the four Rhenish Prince-electors to appear before them in Oberlahnstein to answer charges of failing to maintain the public peace. Together with his overlord the Prince-Elector of Mainz, the Burggraf of Lahneck Castle, Friedrich of Nuremberg, hosted many of many delegates sent by the cities at the castle. When Wenceslaus failed to appear, the electors declared him deposed in August 1400 on account of drunkenness and incompetence. In Rhens, the following day, Rupert, Count Palatine of the Rhine, was elected the new "King of the Romans".

=== Modern era ===
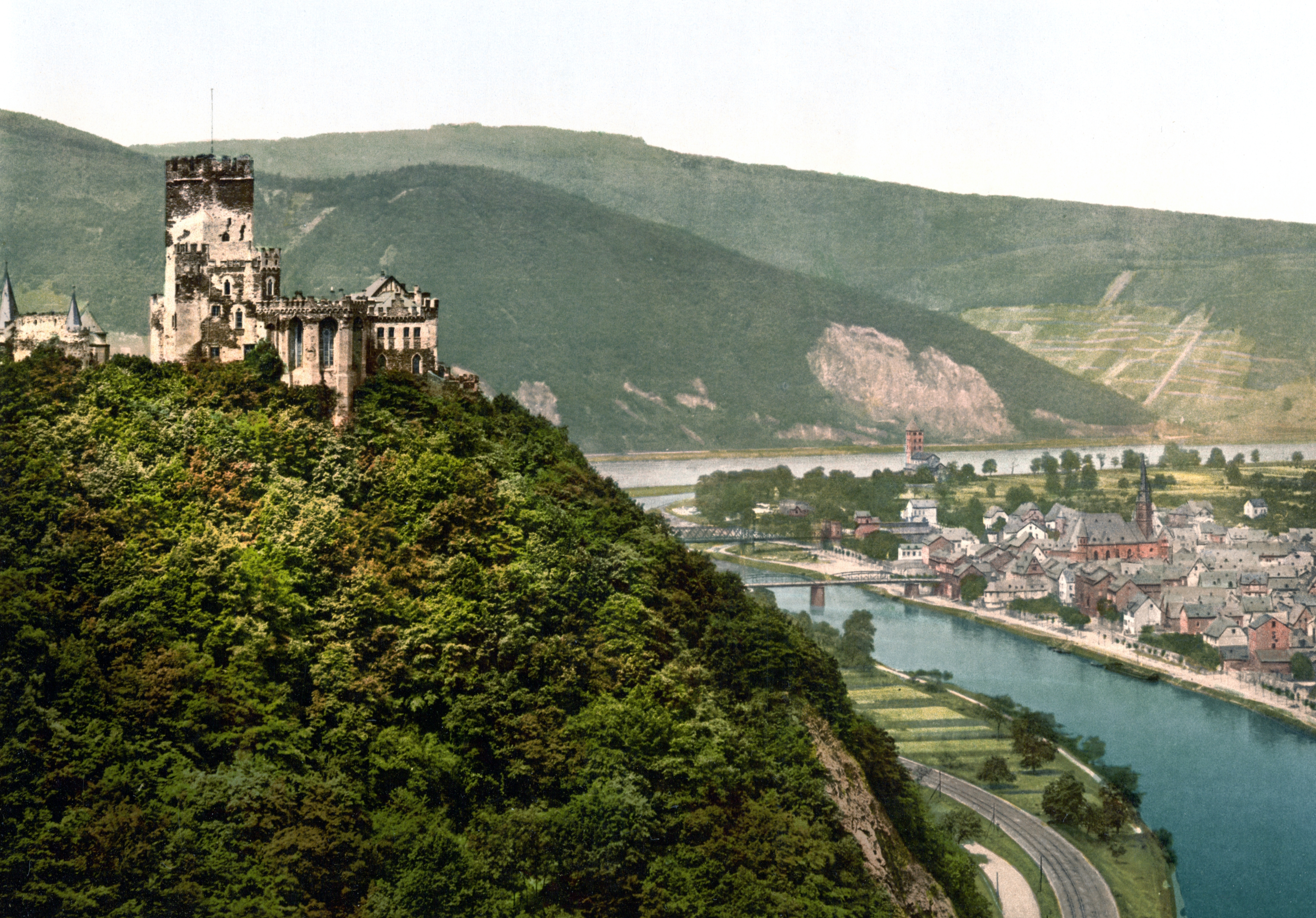
Lahneck Castle c. 1900

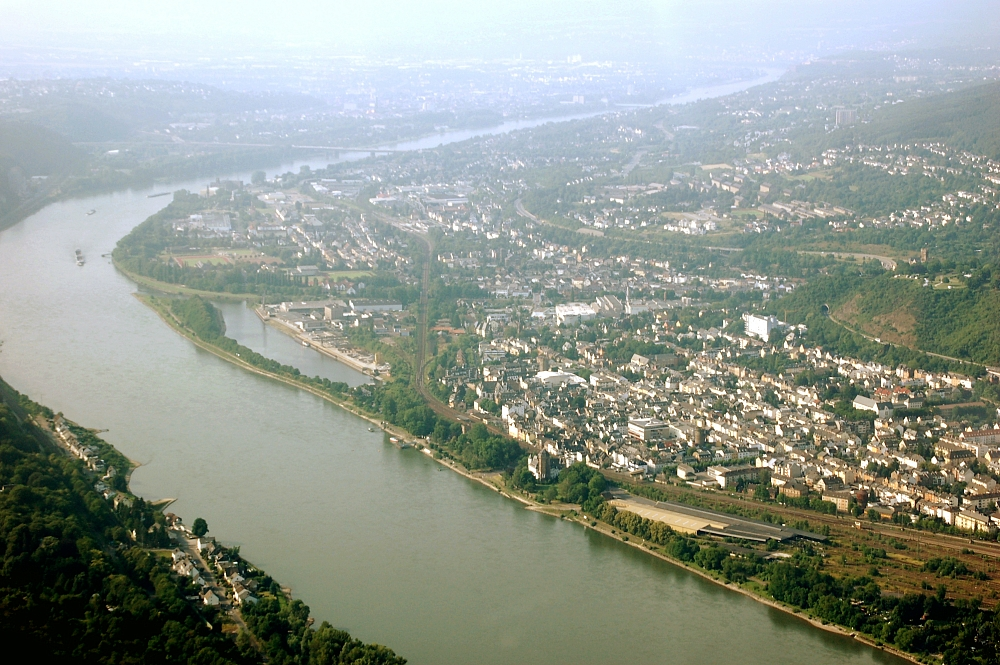
Aerial photograph of Lahnstein and the Rhine Valley

Between 1632 and 1646, during the Thirty Years War, both towns experienced multiple occupations by Swedish, Imperial, Hessian and French troops. In 1688, Lahneck Castle was destroyed and burned by French troops. Between 1795 and 1800, during the French Revolutionary Wars, both towns again experienced multiple occupations by foreign troops (Austrians, Prussians, French and Russians).

In the German mediatisation of 1803, Oberlahnstein came into the possession of Nassau-Usingen, while Niederlahnstein fell to Nassau-Weilburg. In 1806, the independent Nassau principalities were united in the Duchy of Nassau.

In the mid-19th century, under Nassau rule, Oberlahnstein became an important railway junction. In 1858, Nassau's Lahntal railway was built from Oberlahnstein to Bad Ems (and eventually Wetzlar). In 1860, a shipping port on the Rhine was built at Oberlahnstein. In 1862, the East Rhine railway from Wiesbaden to Oberlahnstein was built. In 1864, the East Rhine Railway of Nassau was connected to the Prussian State Railway at Koblenz through construction of a railway bridge over the Lahn.

In 1866, after the Austro-Prussian War, the Duchy of Nassau was annexed by the Kingdom of Prussia. The Nassau state railway was taken over by Prussia, and Oberlahnstein's role as a railway junction was largely transferred to the stations of Niederlahnstein and Koblenz Hauptbahnhof.

In 1873, the first permanent traffic bridge over the Lahn between Oberlahnstein and Niederlahnstein was built. In 1875, the first Protestant church was opened in Oberlahnstein. In 1879 came the construction of the Hohenrhein Railway Bridge (Kanonenbahn) and the new station in Niederlahnstein. In 1885 of the town rights of Niederlahnstein (first awarded 1332) were renewed.

After World War I, the towns were occupied by French troops from 1918 to 1929. In 1926/27, the New Lahn Bridge was built. In 1940, came the first aerial attacks on the town of World War II. The two Lahnsteins were 35% destroyed by bombing by the end of the war. From 1945 to 1956, the towns were occupied by American and later French troops.

On 7 June 1969, Oberlahnstein and Niederlahnstein were united into the City of Lahnstein.

Ever since the unification in 1969, Lahnstein has developed into a regional place for culture, tourism and commerce along the Middle Rhine. The town has invested in preserving its historic architecture while promoting cultural events such as the annual Burgspiele Lahnstein, drawing visitors from across Germany. In recent years, urban revitalization efforts have focused on expanding recreational areas, encouraging sustainable tourism, and improving riverfront access, making Lahnstein as both a scenic gateway and a livable community.

=== History of wine ===
In 1258, a vineyard called Koppelstein was owned by the Counts of Katzenelnbogen. It is a vast field of land, containing a large body of water making the area perfect for wine production.

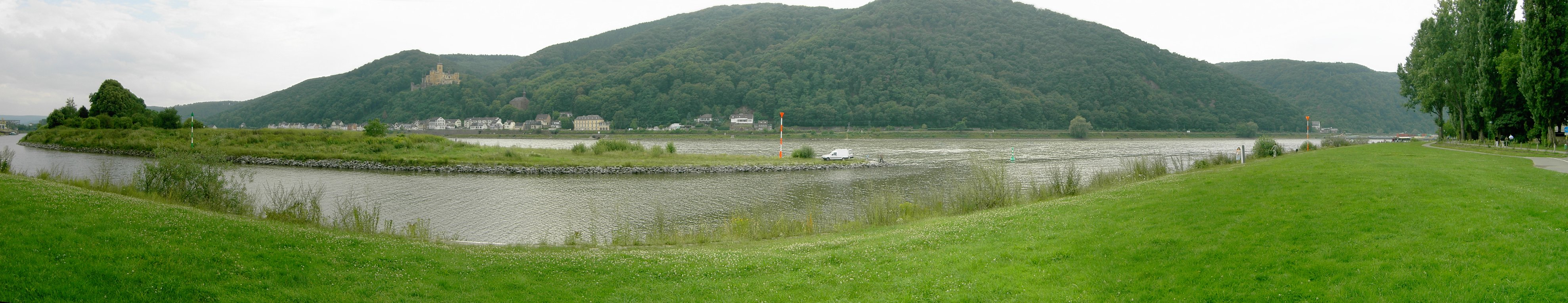
Confluence of the Lahn with the Rhine at Niederlahnstein (opposite Stolzenfels of Koblenz with Schloss Stolzenfels)

== Historic places and visitor attractions ==
=== Niederlahnstein ===
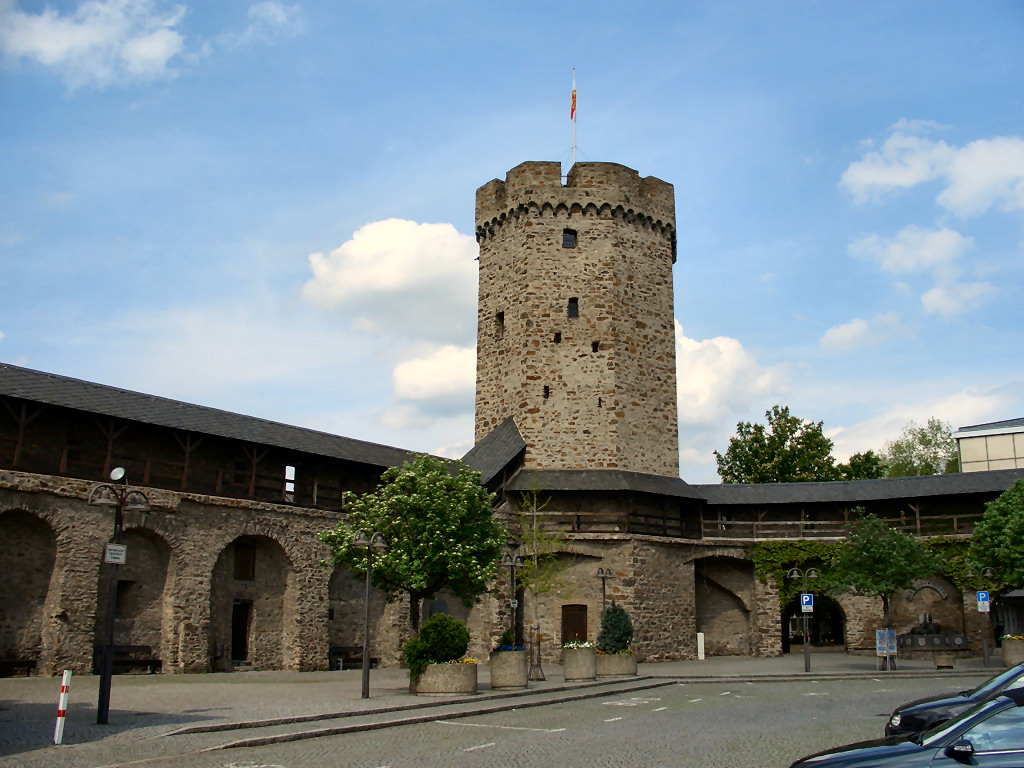
Hexenturm in Lahnstein

- St. John's Church and Abbey – A small church had already existed at the mouth of Lahn since the 9th century. It was the mid-10th century by a slightly larger Ottonian one-nave church. The present church, a flat-roofed Romanesque five-bay pillar basilica was built ca. 1130. It is regarded as the oldest galleried church on the Rhine and was the model for the churches of the so-called Lahn Group, which included the parish churches of Moselweiß and Güls (both villages are now boroughs of Koblenz), Ems, Dietkirchen, and Morsbach in the Siegerland.

By the end of the 18th century, the church had become the parish church of the town of Niederlahnstein, and still belongs to the parish. About being destroyed several times, it remained a ruin after its destruction during the turmoil of the French Revolution until 1856. It was rebuilt between 1856 and 1866. In the meantime, Niederlahnstein’s second church, St. Barbara, became the parish church and remains so today. A centuries old cemetery surrounds the church.

St. John’s Abbey (Johanniskloster) is overseen by the Congregation of the Sacred Hearts of Jesus and Mary (Arnstein Fathers). Colocated with the Abbey is the private St. John's Gymnasium, a state-grant funded high school.

- Parish Church of St. Barbara – The parish of Saint Barbara dates to as early in 1358. It was later rebuilt in 1712 and 1889. The current Neo-Gothic structure near the Lahnbrücke, designed by the architect Martin Weber of Frankfurt, was built between 1937 and 1939.

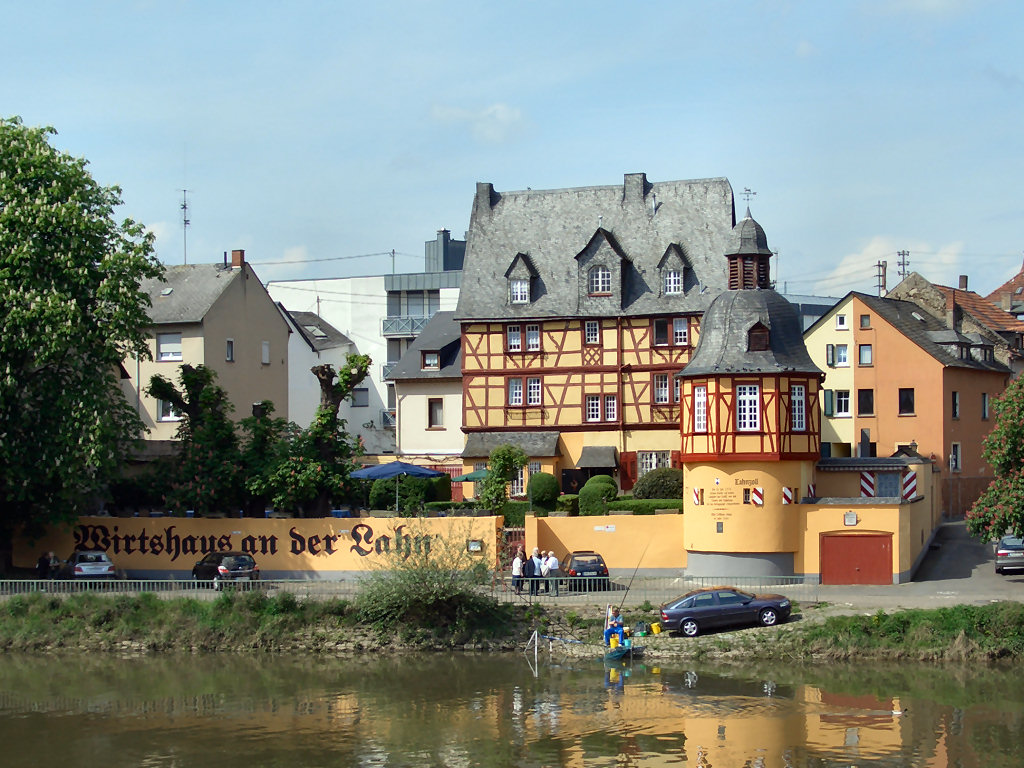
Wirtshaus an der Lahn

- Wirtshaus an der Lahn (Tavern on the Lahn) – This inn on the banks of the Lahn, built in 1697, is allegedly the infamous setting of the legendary Wirtinnenverse (literally "landlady verses", which are bawdy poems similar to limericks). There are actually numerous taverns along the Lahn with long histories of operation and many claim to be the "genuine" Wirtshaus an der Lahn from the song. The most likely is this one in Niederlahnstein, located on the Lahnstraße directly above the bridge.

The estate, rather large for its time, was based on a customs tower of the Archbishopric of Trier from 1348, called the "Land Stronghold" (Landfeste). On the shore in front of the customs tower was a jetty serving shipping along the Lahn. It was popularly known as the "port", although there was never a proper harbor there. The road to Nassau, which followed the banks of the Lahn, also passed by the location.

In this visible location, the innkeeper Balthasar Kalkofen built his original inn, popular with boatmen and wagon drivers, in 1697. This part of the building, then situated parallel to the Lahn, still exists. The ground floor of the three-floor building is constructed of masonry with massive quarried stone, while the upper stories are of half-timbered construction (Fachwerkbau). The round half-timbered customs tower with a curved roof and the distinctive roof lantern dates from 1741. After the death of Balthasar Kalkofen, his widow, Catherine, operated the inn alone until 1727. She could have been the "woman hostess" from the song.

A historically interesting episode occurred here on 18 July 1774. Johann Wolfgang von Goethe, accompanied by Johann Kaspar Lavater and Johann Bernhard Basedow, came to Lahnstein while on a boat trip on the Lahn and Rhine Rivers. He had lunch at the inn on the Lahn, after which, inspired by the sight of Lahneck Castle, he wrote the poem Geistesgruß. The Wirtshaus an der Lahn is still a restaurant today.

=== Friedrichssegen ===
This former mining village is situated about 5 km (3.1 mi) east of Lahnstein proper near the town of Frücht. In 2000, the Friedrichssegen Mine Workers Association opened a mining museum. The exhibits include historic photos of the mine (1905–1910) and over 40 displays of genuine Friedrichssegen minerals. The mine produced minerals, primarily lead, with zinc, silver and copper all as co-products. The mine ceased operations in 1913.

== Politics ==
=== Town council ===
==== Leadership ====
The mayor is the head of the institution "Stadtverwaltung Lahnstein". He implements the decisions of the council and is transferred to the state affairs (contract matters) responsible. He is manager and supervisor of the municipal officials.

The current Lord Mayor of Lahnstein is Lennart Siefert, elected in September 2021. He succeeded Peter Labonte (CDU).

==== Parties ====
The distribution of seats in the town council (German: Stadtrat) is as follows:

Parties and Voter Groups		Seats 2019
CDU	Christian Democratic Union	9
SPD	Social Democratic Party	7
ULL	independent list	6
Greens	Alliance '90/The Greens	5
FBL	Free Citizens List (Freie Bürger Liste)	3
FDP	Free Democratic Party	2
Total		32

== Twin towns ==
- Kettering, England, since 1956
- Vence, France, since 1967
- Ouahigouya, Burkina Faso, since 1978
- Hermsdorf, Thuringia, Germany, since December 1990
- Montesilvano, Italy, since May 2016

== Sport and leisure ==
Lahnstein offers a variety of climbing and hiking trails

- The Rheinsteig

The new Rhine mountain trail from Bonn to Wiesbaden in traverses the district of Lahnstein on the health resort and the Ruppertsklamm. Oberlahnstein is on the trail of the Lahneck Castele connected to the Rheinsteig.

- The Rheinhöhenweg

This trail leads over Lahneck Castle and the Lahn bridge between Ober- and Niederlahnstein.

- The Lahnhöhenweg

This trail starts in Oberlahnstein and ends at the Lahneck Castle

- The Lahn-Camino

The Jakobsweg from Wetzlar to Oberlahnstein ends at the hospital chapel, from where it continues towards Kaub on the Rhine-Camino

== People ==
- Daniel Bahr (born 1976), politician (FDP)
- Timo Scheider (born 1978), racing driver

== Transport ==
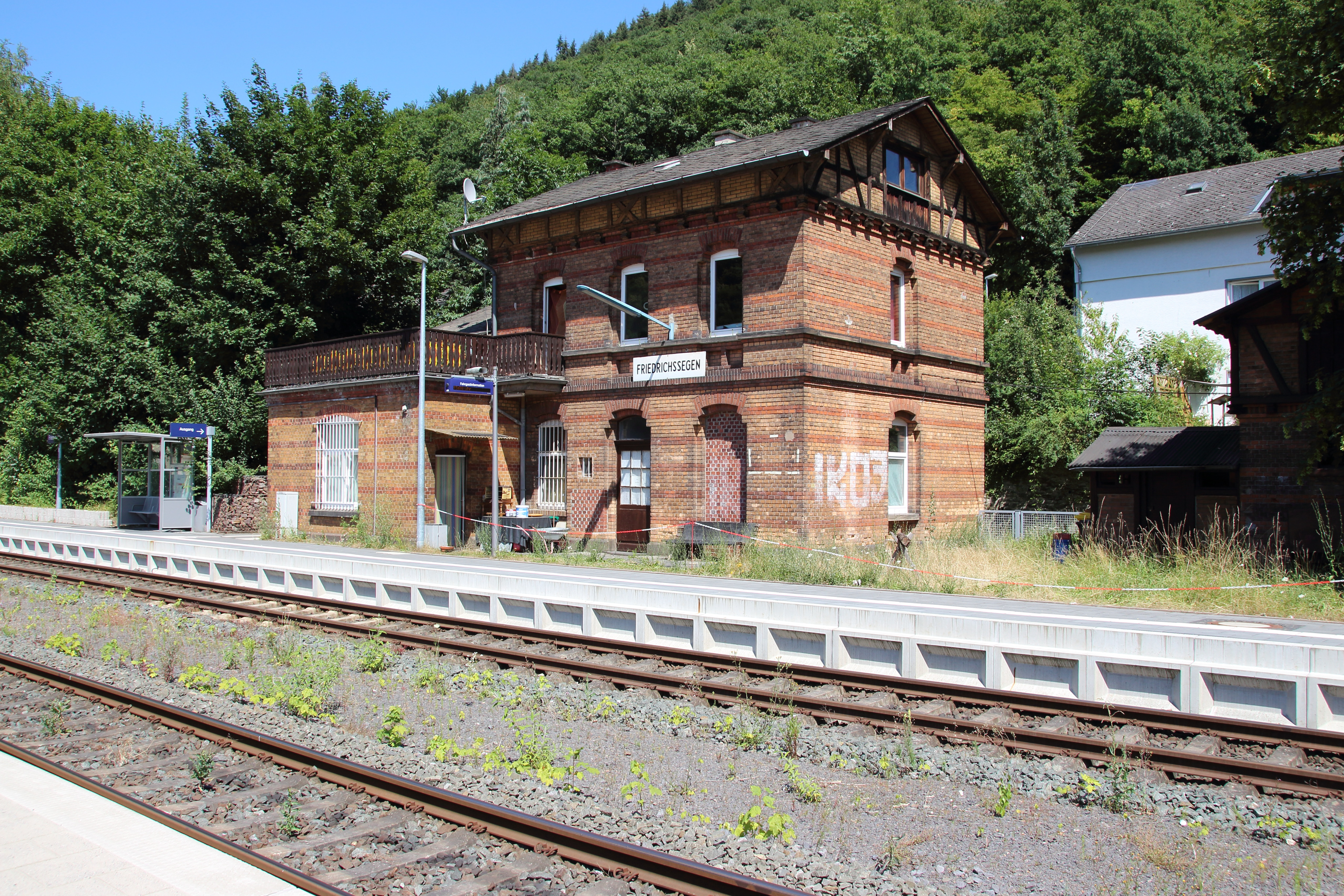
Friedrichssegen station

The train stations Niederlahnstein, Oberlahnstein and Friedrichssegen are located in Lahnstein. Lahnstein is located in the area of the transport association Verkehrsverbund Rhein-Mosel (VRM), in the zone number 313.

== See also ==
- Allerheiligenberg Monastery
