= Oberlahnstein station =

Railway station in Lahnstein, Germany

Oberlahnstein
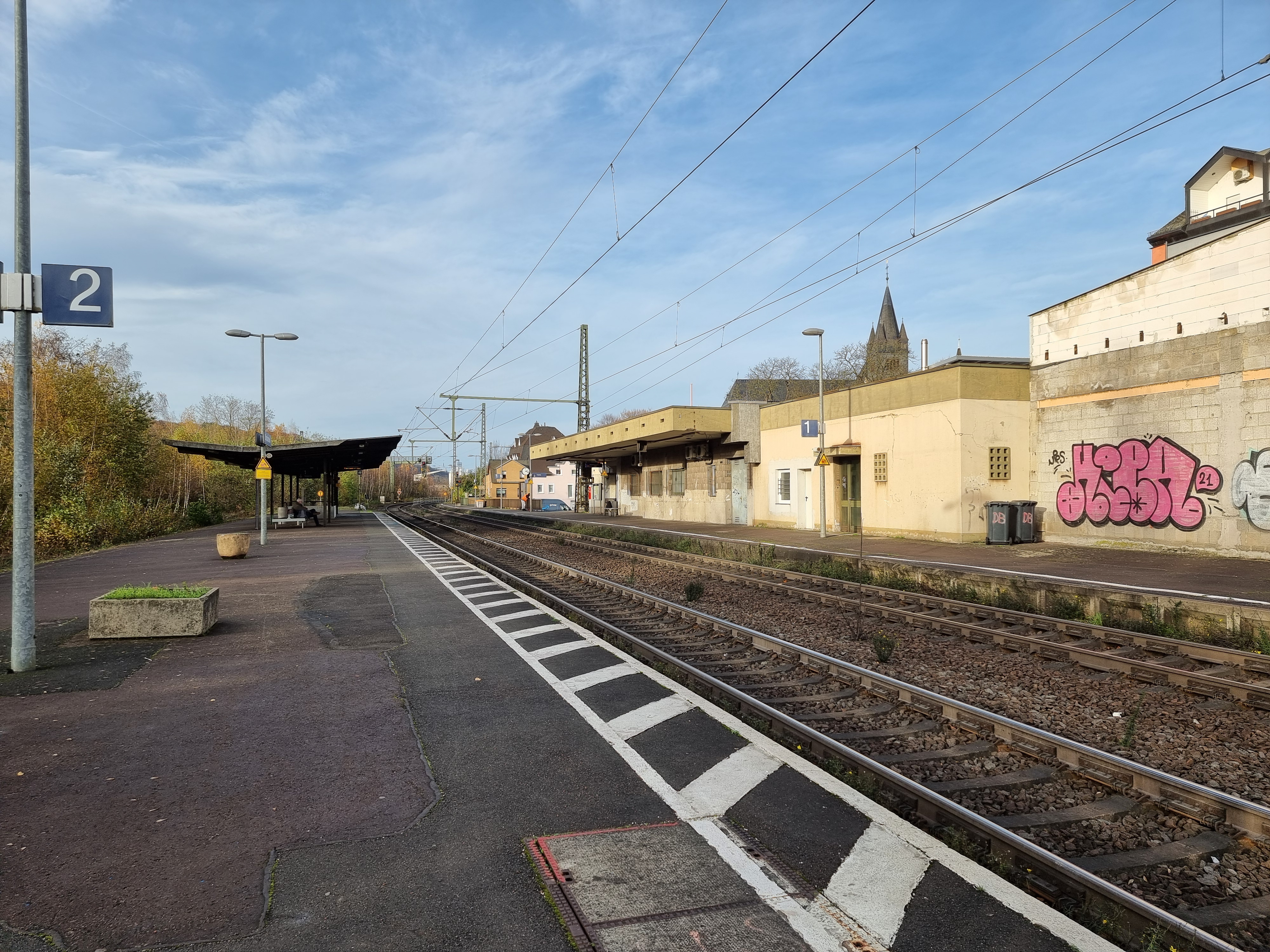

General information
- Location: Bürgermeister-Müller-Str. 2, Lahnstein, Rhineland-Palatinate; Germany
- Coordinates: 50°17′59″N 7°36′14″E
- Lines: East Rhine Railway (122.0 km); Lahn Valley Railway (99.0 km)
- Platforms: 3

Construction
- Accessible: Platform 1 only

Other information
- Station code: 4659
- DS100 code: KOL
- IBNR: 8004550
- Category: 5
- Fare zone: VRM: 501
- Website: www.bahnhof.de

History
- Opened: 1 July 1858; 168 years ago

Services
Preceding station	VIAS	Following station
Niederlahnstein towards Neuwied	RB 10	Braubach towards Frankfurt (Main) Hbf
Location

Oberlahnstein station is, along with Niederlahnstein and Friedrichssegen, one of three stations in the town of Lahnstein in the German state of Rhineland-Palatinate. It is a through station with 3 platform tracks on the East Rhine Railway (German: Rechte Rheinstrecke) and is located in the Oberlahnstein district. The adjacent former freight depot is now a brownfield site.

== History ==
The first section of the Lahn Valley Railway was opened from Oberlahnstein to Bad Ems on 1 July 1858, but shortly afterwards it was buried by a landslide. The Nassau Rhine Railway Company (Nassauische Rhein Eisenbahn-Gesellschaft) opened in 1856, the first section of the Nassau Rhine Railway (Nassauische Rheinbahn) from Wiesbaden to Rudesheim, which was authorised in 1853. Due to financial and technical difficulties, the line was not opened to Oberlahnstein until 1862. It was extended to Niederlahnstein on 3 June 1864. The Stolzenfels–Oberlahnstein train ferry connected the right and the left Rhine lines for two years from the second half of 1862.

A direct connection was opened from Niederlahnstein to Hohenrhein junction on the Lahn Valley Railway in 1879. This meant that Oberlahnstein station lost some of its importance.

Around 1960, the entire East Rhine Railway from Cologne to Wiesbaden was electrified. The station building, which had been heavily damaged in World War II, was replaced by a new building in 1968.

On 30 May 1983, the Oberlahnstein–Friedrichssegen section of the Lahn Valley Railway was closed and dismantled. Thus Oberlahnstein station lost its function as a railway junction in the Rhine-Mosel-Lahn area, which has now largely been transferred to the Niederlahnstein station and Koblenz Central Station (Hauptbahnhof). However, no passenger trains had run on this section since the 1910s, except for a brief period after the Second World War.

In December 2007, an electronic interlocking was commissioned on the Right Rhine line. In the summer of 2008, the second phase of the project was completed and the Oberlahnstein–Niederlahnstein section was connected to the electronic interlocking system.

=== Oberlahnstein depot ===
As early as 1862 a small locomotive depot (Lokstation) was established in Oberlahnstein, which later developed into the Oberlahnstein depot (Bahnbetriebswerk). The depot was disbanded as a separate unit in 1962, when the roundhouse was also demolished.

== Platforms ==
Oberlahnstein station once had an extensive system of tracks, which were mainly located in the now closed and dismantled freight yard. Passenger services use a “home” and a side platform.

The numbering begins on the southwest side of the station building.

- Track 1 is a through track and is the home platform in front of the station building. Today the Stadt-Express services on the RheingauLinie (SE 10) towards Koblenz Hbf and Neuwied stop here.
- Track 2 is also a through track and shares an island platform with track 4. This is used by the VIAS trains to Frankfurt Central Station (Hbf) via Rüdesheim and Wiesbaden Central Station (Hbf).
- Track 4 is a through track and shares the platform with track 2. This track is overgrown with vegetation and is no longer usable today.

The tracks of the former Oberlahnstein freight yard are slightly offset to the tracks of the passenger station and the site is considered a brownfield.

== Rail services ==
Oberlahnstein station is only served by local trains. The southern section of the East Rhine Railway (Koblenz–Wiesbaden–Frankfurt) was served until the beginning of the 2010/2011 timetable in December 2010 by the Loreley-Bahn (RB 10) and the Loreley-Express (RE 10), which were operated by Deutsche Bahn (DB). As the result of a Europe-wide tender, services since 12 December 2010 have been operated as a single Regionalbahn service every hour, sometimes even at half-hour intervals, by VIAS GmbH, using new Stadler FLIRT sets.

Line	Service	Route	Frequency
RB 10	RheingauLinie	Neuwied – Koblenz – Oberlahnstein – Wiesbaden – Frankfurt	Hourly
