= Nochern =

- Municipality
- Coat of arms

- Location of Nochern within Rhein-Lahn-Kreis district
- Interactive map of Nochern
- Location within Germany Location within Rhineland-Palatinate
- Coordinates: 50°10′39″N 7°43′28″E
- Country: Germany
- State: Rhineland-Palatinate
- District: Rhein-Lahn-Kreis
- Municipal assoc.: Loreley

Government
  - Mayor (2019–24): Rudolf Speich

Area
  - Total: 7.11 km^{2} (2.75 sq mi)
- Elevation: 250 m (820 ft)

Population (2025-12-31)
  - Total: 468
  - Density: 65.8/km^{2} (170/sq mi)
- Time zone: UTC+01:00 (CET)
  - Summer (DST): UTC+02:00 (CEST)
- Postal codes: 56357
- Dialling codes: 06771
- Vehicle registration: EMS, DIZ, GOH
- Website: www.nochern.de

Nochern (German pronunciation: [ˈnɔxɐn]) is a municipality and village in the district of Rhein-Lahn, in Rhineland-Palatinate, in western Germany. It has 12 hectares of vineyards facing south down into the Rhine valley. The Rheinsteig walking track passes it.

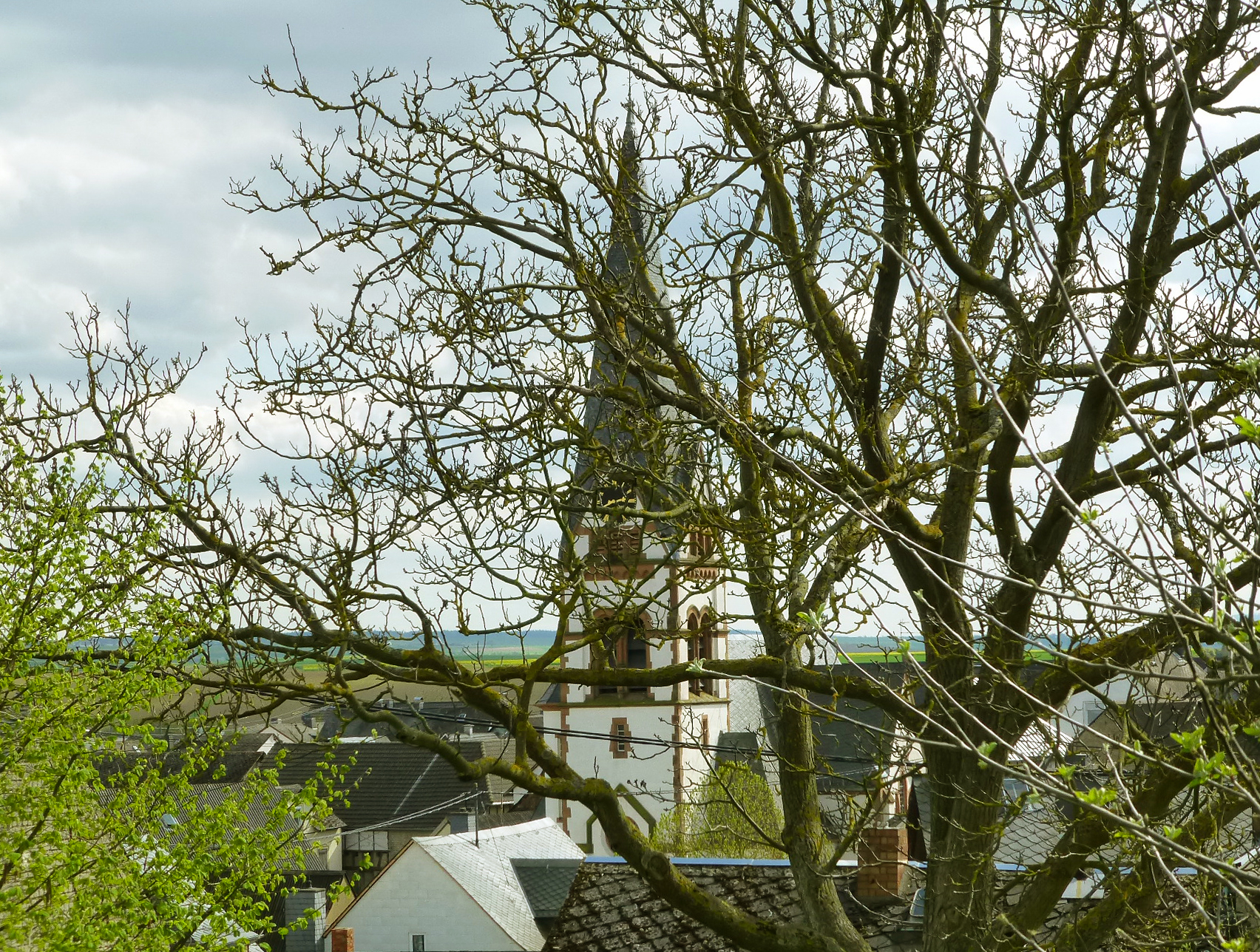
The church tower of Nochern
