= Lykershausen =

- Municipality
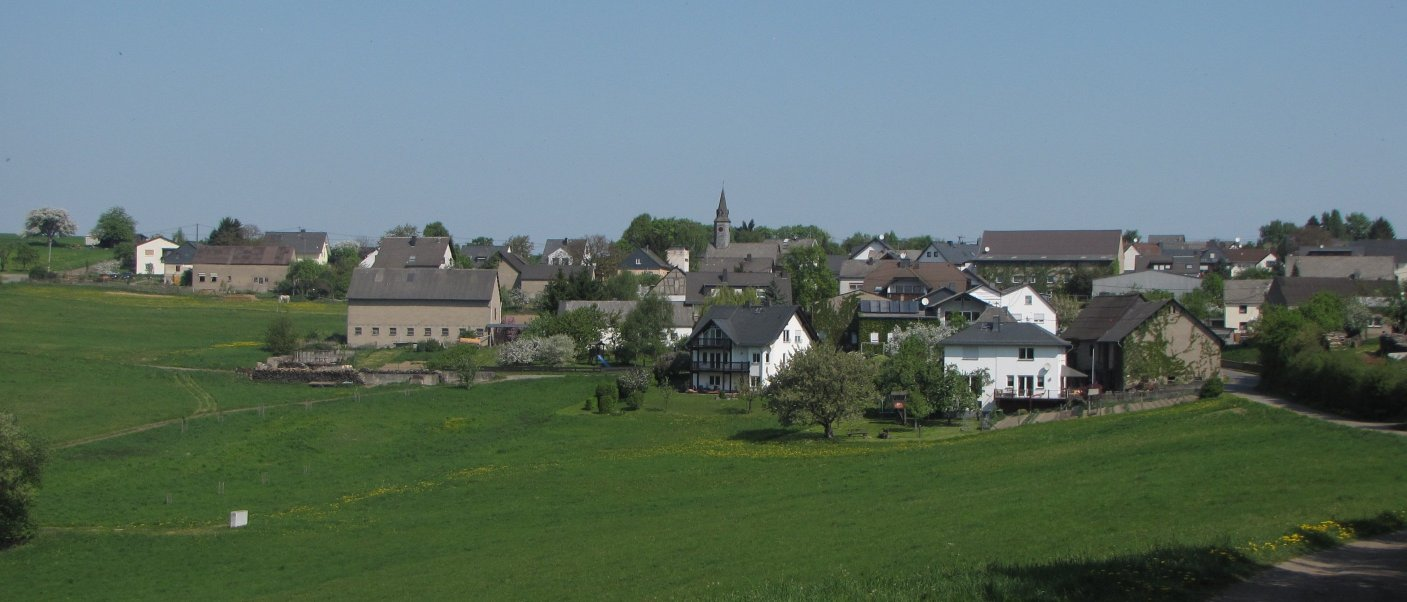

- Coat of arms

- Location of Lykershausen within Rhein-Lahn-Kreis district
- Interactive map of Lykershausen
- Location within Germany Location within Rhineland-Palatinate
- Coordinates: 50°12′22″N 7°39′59″E
- Country: Germany
- State: Rhineland-Palatinate
- District: Rhein-Lahn-Kreis
- Municipal assoc.: Loreley

Government
  - Mayor (2019–24): Michael Kring

Area
  - Total: 3.35 km^{2} (1.29 sq mi)
- Elevation: 351 m (1,152 ft)

Population (2025-12-31)
  - Total: 216
  - Density: 64.5/km^{2} (167/sq mi)
- Time zone: UTC+01:00 (CET)
  - Summer (DST): UTC+02:00 (CEST)
- Postal codes: 56346
- Dialling codes: 06773
- Vehicle registration: EMS, DIZ, GOH
- Website: www.lykershausen.de

Lykershausen is a municipality in the district of Rhein-Lahn, in Rhineland-Palatinate, in western Germany.
