= Allerheiligenberg Monastery =

- Kloster Allerheiligenberg (German)
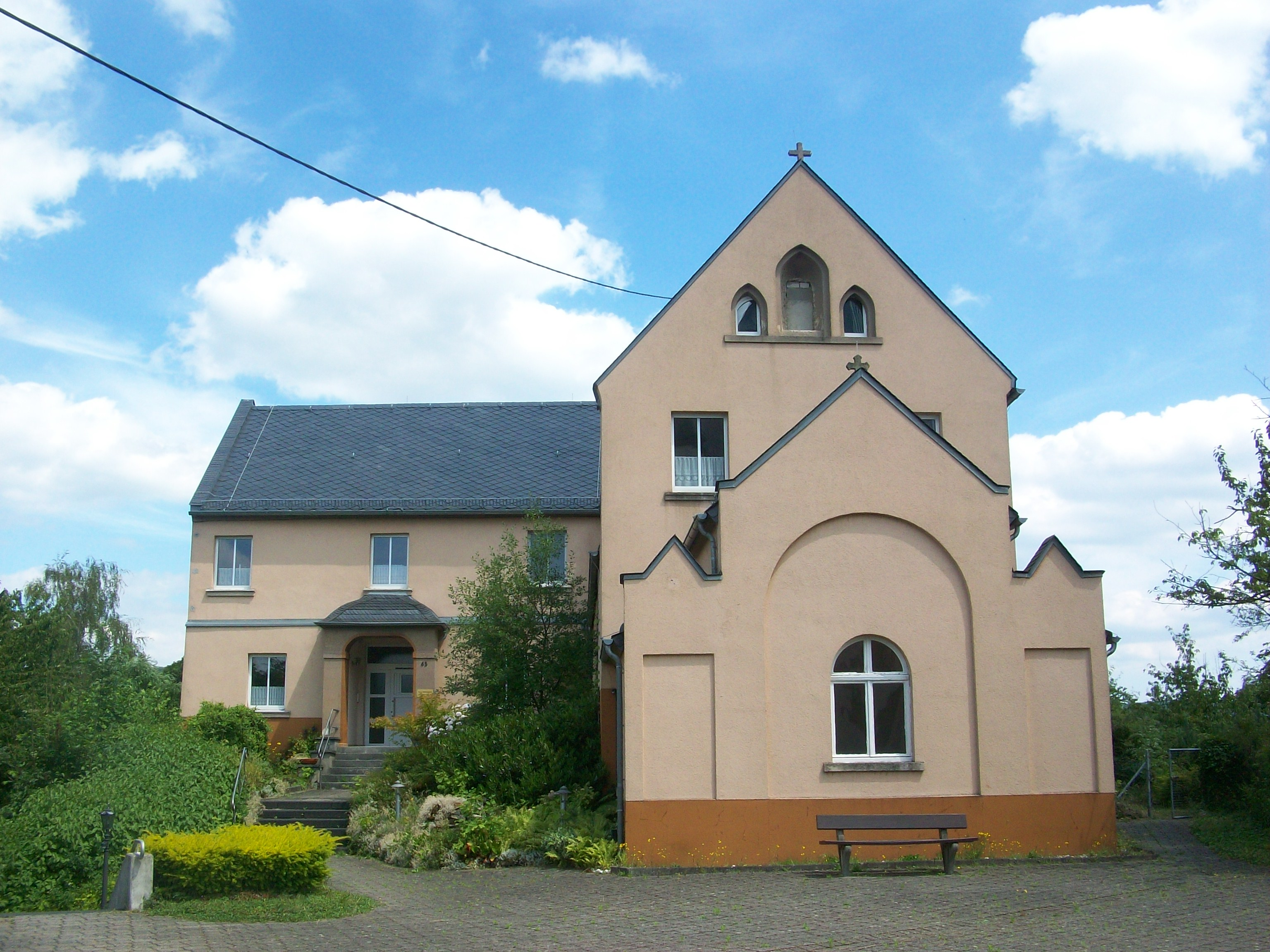
- Interactive map of Allerheiligenberg Monastery
- 50.312427°N 7.613551°E
- Location: Lahnstein

The Allerheiligenberg Monastery was a catholic monastery in Lahnstein, Germany. It belonged to the Missionary Oblates of Mary Immaculate, but from spring 2012 was no longer used.

Since the end of 2014, the monastery Allerheiligenberg is privately owned.

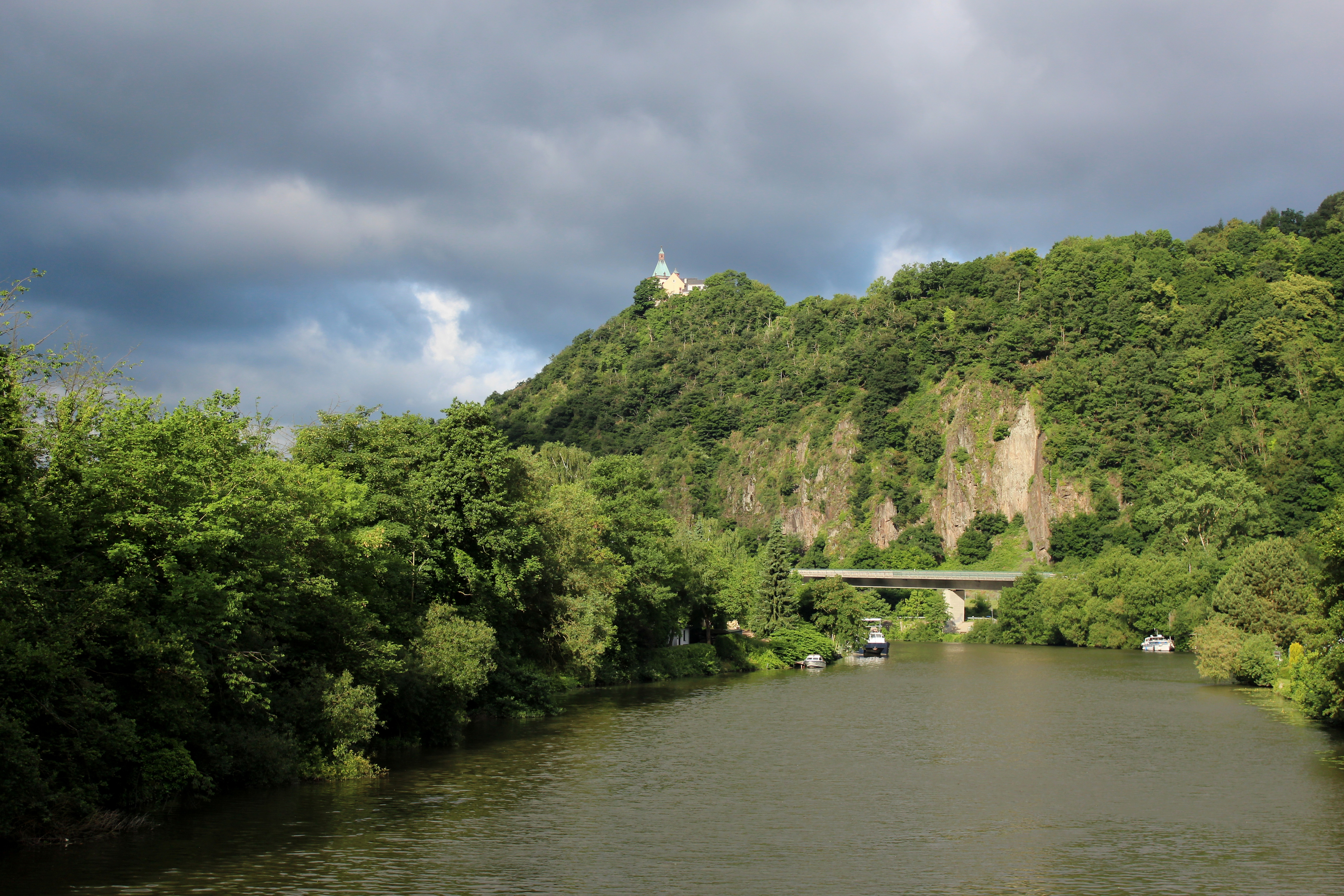
View from Lahn-river up to the mountain Allerheiligenberg in Lahnstein

From 1919 to 2012, the Oblate Padres were active on the Allerheiligenberg in Lahnstein and took pastoral care of the Allerheiligenbergkapelle. For many years a community of missionaries was on the Allerheiligenberg. In the 1990th a youth community was founded here. Until the closure of the monastery the scholasticate for the Central European Province of the Oblates was located on the Allerheiligenberg. After the novitiate the young religious people came to Lahnstein and studied theology at the Philosophical-Theological College of the SAC in Vallendar. At last 10 religious belonged to the monastery, including students and Padres from Germany, Namibia, South Africa and India.

== See also ==
- Catholic Church in Germany
