= Niederlahnstein =

- Stadtteil of Lahnstein
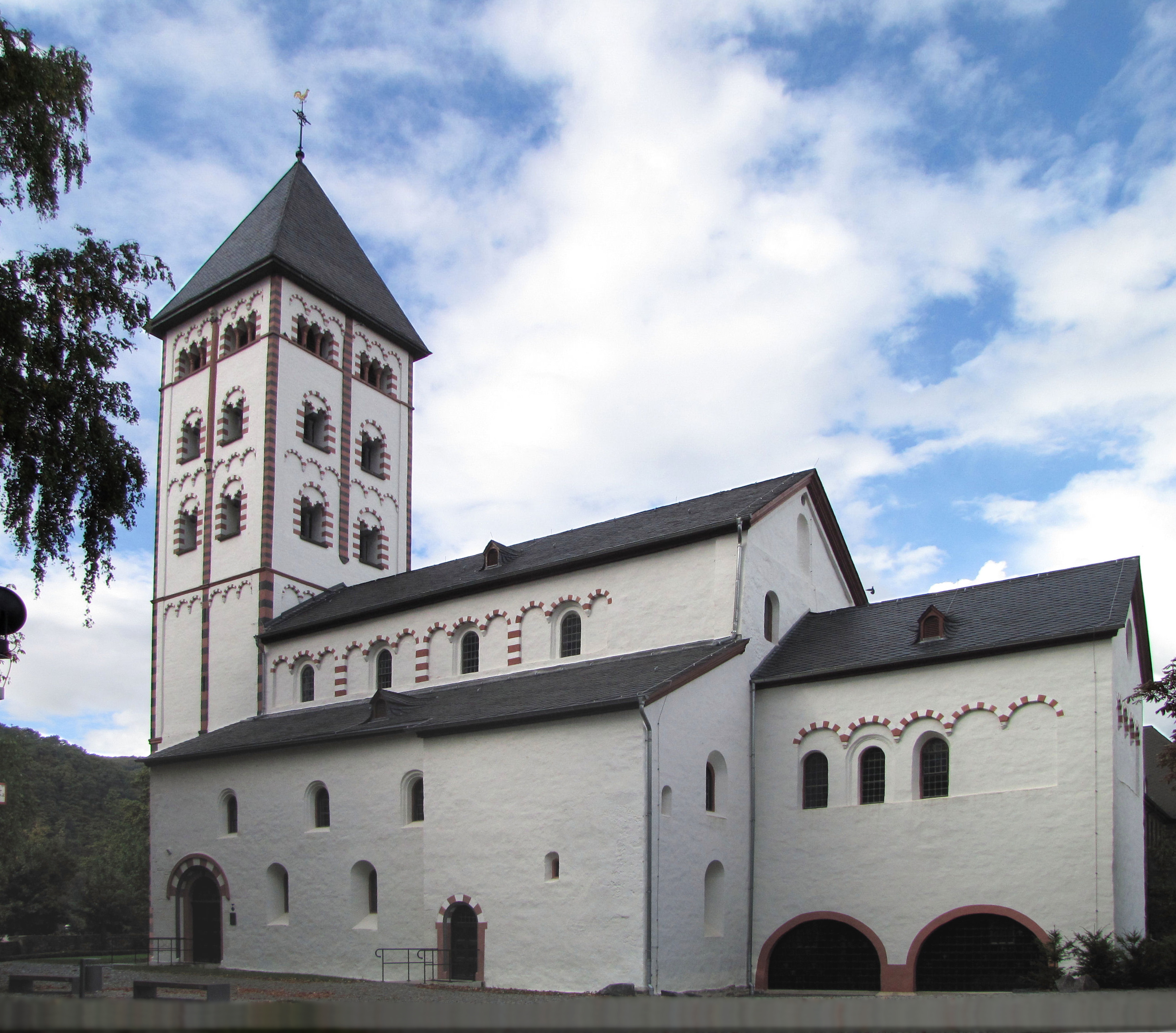
- Church of St. John

- Coat of arms
- Interactive map of Niederlahnstein
- Location within Germany Location within Rhineland-Palatinate
- Coordinates: 50°19′01″N 7°35′59″E
- Country: Germany
- State: Rhineland-Palatinate
- Town: Lahnstein
- Time zone: UTC+01:00 (CET)
  - Summer (DST): UTC+02:00 (CEST)

Niederlahnstein is a part of the city of Lahnstein in Rhineland-Palatinate in Germany.

Niederlahnstein is situated on the right bank of the Rhine, and on the right bank of the Lahn, near their confluence. In the vicinity are the Johanniskirche, of a Romanesque design, and the Allerheiligenberg, whereon stands a chapel, once a famous place of pilgrimage.

== History ==
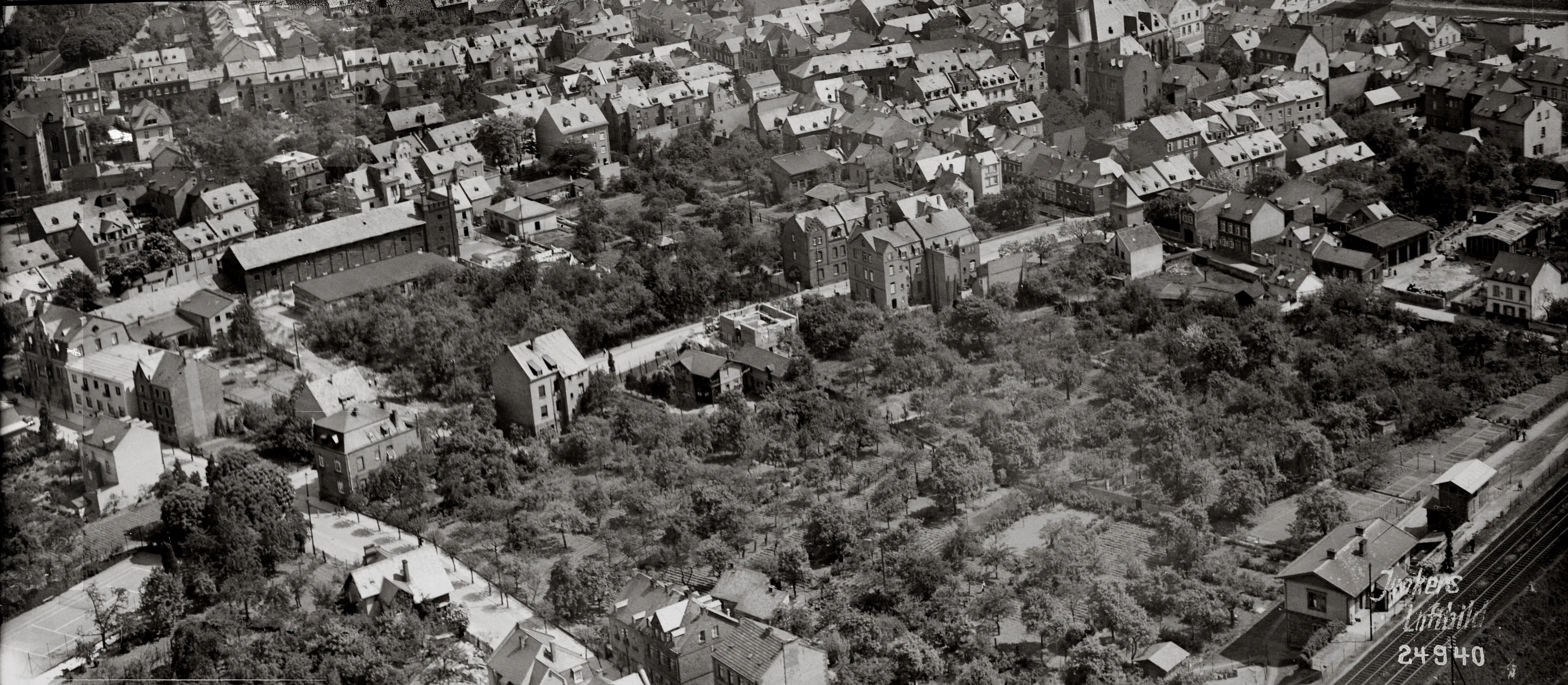
Niederlahnstein in 1929

Niederlahnstein obtained civic rights in 1332, and was until 1803 on the territory of the elector of Trier. Here on 1 January 1814 a part of the Russian army crossed the Rhine. In 1905, it had a population of 4,351 people. By 1939, this had grown to 6,812. It has two Roman Catholic churches. In 1911, the chief industries were the making of machinery and shipbuilding.

After World War II, in 1945–1946, it was the location of a displaced persons camp for Italians, Poles, French, Belgians, Dutch, Czechs and Estonians.

On 7 June 1969, Niederlahnstein was joined with Oberlahnstein to form the city of Lahnstein.

== Johanniskirche ==
The Johanniskirche (English: Church of St. John, named after John the Baptist) was constructed from 1130 to 1136. It is the oldest gallery church in the Middle Rhine region. The church building, which is situated directly on the bank of the Rhine, was an important example of the development of church buildings in the Middle Rhine region.

In 1794, it burned to the ground, and it remained a ruin until 1856, when reconstruction began. In 1884 another fire caused the tower to collapse. In 1906, it became a monastery church.

== See also ==
- Niederlahnstein station
