= Kennedy Bridge (Bonn) =

Kennedy-Brücke
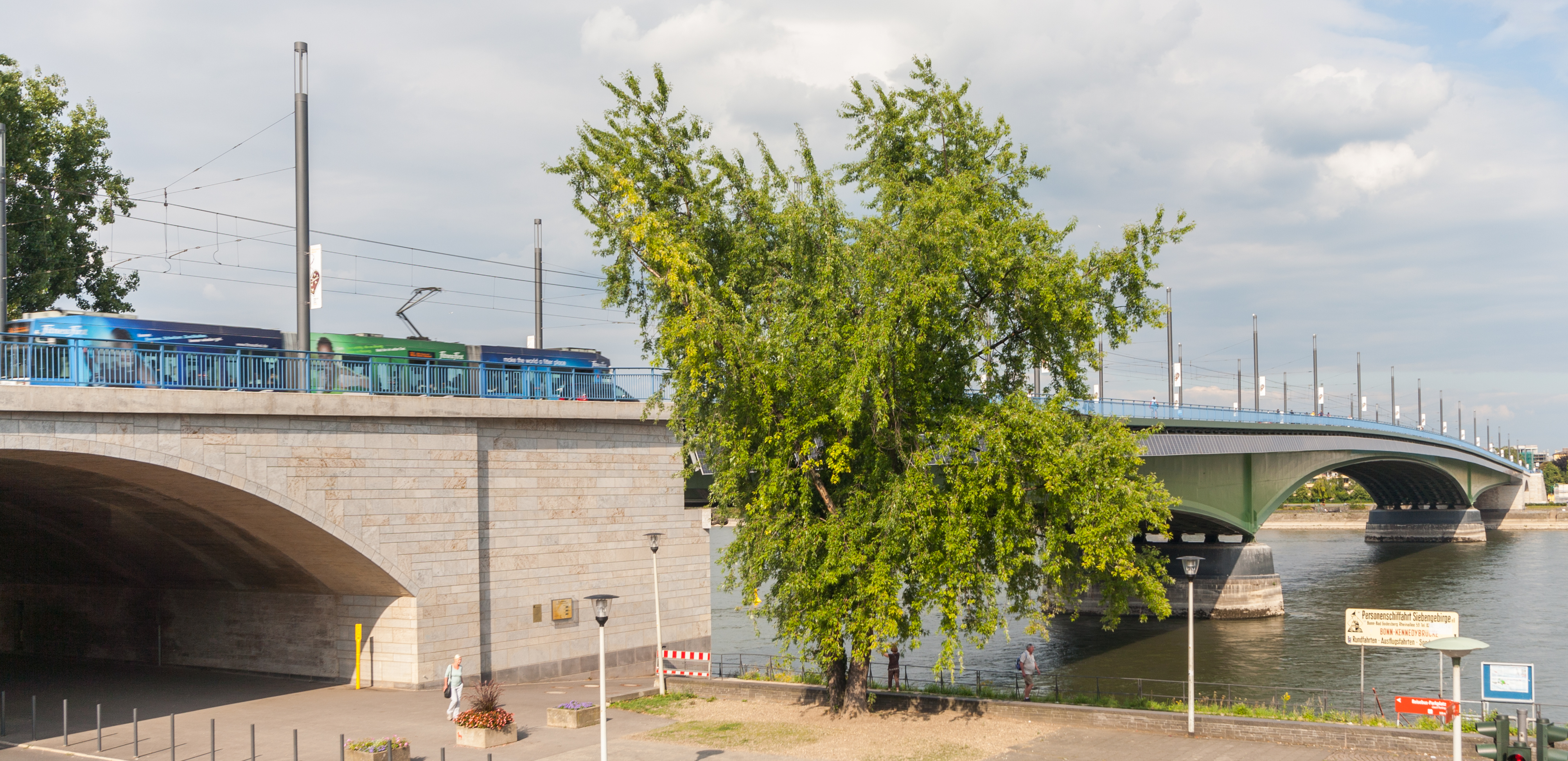
- Kennedy Bridge. View from the left bank. Photo taken in 2006.
- Coordinates: 50°44.29′N 007°06.62′E
- Carries: 4 lanes of roadway (B56) and tram ("Telekom-Express")
- Crosses: Rhine
- Locale: Bonn, North Rhine-Westphalia

Characteristics
- Total length: 394 meters (1,292.65 ft)
- Width: 16 meters (52.49 ft)
- Longest span: 195.80 meters (642.39 ft)

History
- Opened: November 12, 1949

Location
- Interactive map of Kennedy-Brücke

The Kennedy Bridge (German: Kennedybrücke) is one of Bonn's three Rhine bridges connecting the city center of Bonn on the western side with the town center of Beuel on the eastern side, situated between the North and South Bridges. A reconstruction of the bridge due to corrosion, which began in 2007, was finished in July 2011.

== History ==
=== Background and construction ===
There had been regular ferry service across the Rhine river in Bonn since the 17th century.

Bonn made the first plans for a bridge to the right bank of the Rhine in 1889. Initially, the construction costs were estimated at 2.58 million marks. The citizens of Bonn wanted the town of Vilich (modern-day Beuel) to contribute 10% of the costs, but Vilich's local council offered the insufficient sum of 2,500 marks. They feared that the construction would exceed the estimated costs and were more interested in building the bridge closer to Vilich's town center. However, the city wanted the most economical connection across the river for their business center, the former Vierecksplatz (today's Bertha-von-Suttner-Platz). The Bonn rejected Vilich's offer and eventually they agreed that the Rechtsrheinischen (people living on the right bank of the Rhine) would offer the space for the bridge ramp on their side for free and build a road to link their town with the bridge. The city council of Bonn officially decided in 1894 to bear the full costs of building the Rhine bridge, after other financing opportunities were unsuccessful.

Issues with the ferrymen who held shipping rights ('Fährrechte') over the possible financial losses caused by the Rhine bridge delayed construction. On May 13, 1896, the city of Bonn and the ferrymen both agreed on a payment of 190,000 marks in settlement and a further compensation of 30,000 marks for their losses.

In July 1894, a competition for the bridge was announced. The steel company Gutehoffnungshütte, the contractor R. Schneider from Berlin, and the architect Bruno Moehring won first place and were awarded 8,000 marks. The winners also received the contract to build the Rhine bridge. In April 1896, construction began, and on December 17, 1898, the bridge was opened to public traffic.

The building cost of 4 million marks was funded by a public loan and paid for by a toll. The toll was abolished for cars in 1927 and finally for all pedestrians in 1938.

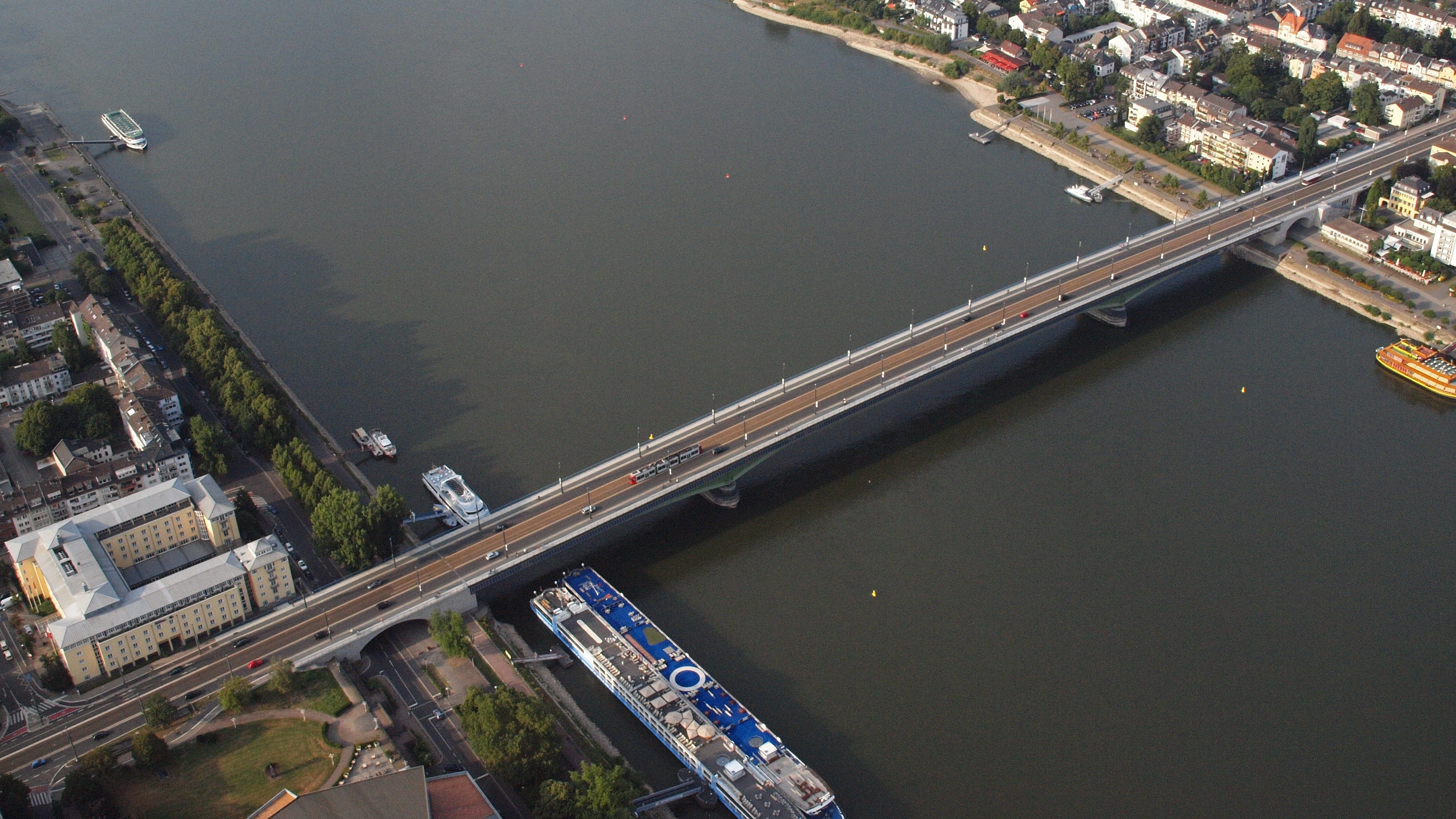
Bonn, Kennedy-Bridge

=== Renaming, destruction and first reconstruction ===
In 1933, during the Nazi era, the bridge was renamed 'Klaus-Clemens Bridge' after a Sturmabteilung member who was killed in a clash with communists in 1930. On March 8, 1945 at 8:20 PM, two months before the end of World War II, the retreating Wehrmacht destroyed the bridge.

On August 29, 1945, Bonn's Committee for Urban Planning dealt with the construction of a new bridge and released the plans in March 1946. In September 1946, companies Stahlbau Rheinhausen and Grün & Bilfinger started construction. The new bridge was built within 36 months on the nearly intact pillars of the old Rhine Bridge. On November 12, 1949, the new bridge was opened.

On December 2, 1963, just ten days after the assassination of U.S. President John F. Kennedy, the bridge was again renamed 'Kennedy Bridge' during a ceremony in the presence of the U.S. Ambassador to West Germany, George McGhee, and Bonn's mayor, Wilhelm Daniels.

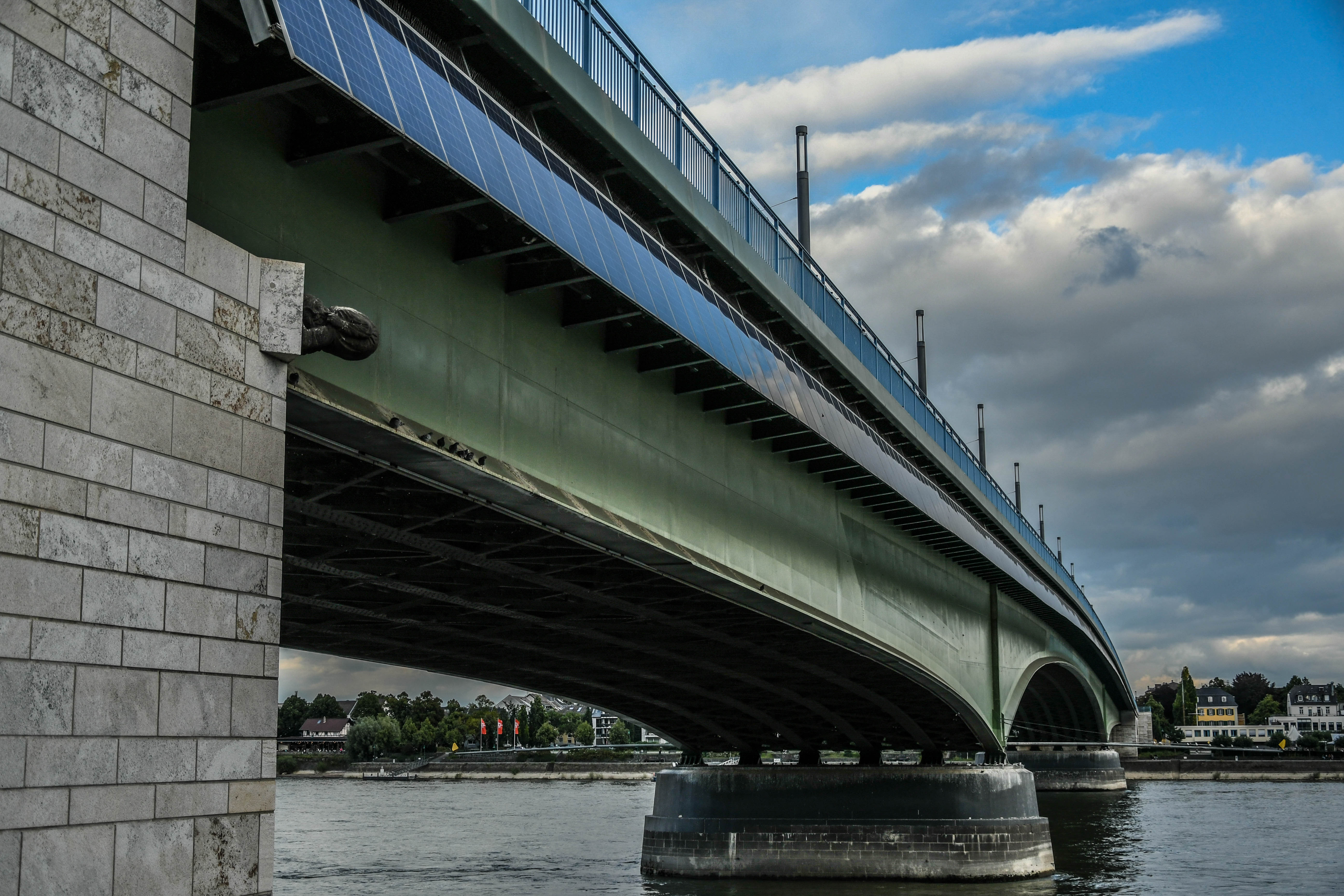

=== Second reconstruction ===
In 2003, heavy corrosion damage was found below the sidewalks and the Bonn's city council decided on the Kennedy Bridge's reconstruction and widening. Subsequently, the reconstruction (north side, south side, road surface) began on April 16, 2007 and was funded with 40 million euros. The new Kennedy Bridge was completed in July 2011, later than the original completion date of April 2011.

== See also ==
- List of memorials to John F. Kennedy
