= List of train ferries =

This is a list of train ferries that are designed to carry railway vehicles. These include purpose-built train ferries that can be quickly loaded and unloaded by roll-on/roll-off, and car floats or rail barges which are barges that carry trains.

== Current train ferries ==
=== Azerbaijan ===
- Baku – Türkmenbaşy (Russian: Krasnovodsk) (Паромная переправа Баку — Туркменбаши), connecting Azerbaijan with Turkmenistan across the Caspian Sea since 1963. In May 2008 they decided to buy a longer ferry.
- Baku, Azerbaijan to Aktau, Kazakhstan.

=== Bolivia ===
- Train ferry on Lake Titicaca from Peru – 1,435 mm (4 ft 8 1/2 in) and 1,000 mm (3 ft 3 3/8 in) gauges at each end.

=== Bulgaria ===
- The Varna-Odesa (Ukraine) train ferry line served by 4 boats (13,000 tonnes deadweight (DWT) each, carrying 108 loaded railroad cars) opened in 1978, bypasses a break of gauge. Later, the service was extended to include lines to Poti and Batumi, Georgia. Boats can carry trucks and passengers as well.

=== Canada ===
- Delta, British Columbia – Nanaimo, British Columbia (E&N Railway) Seaspan
- Matane, Quebec – Baie-Comeau, Quebec (COGEMA)

=== China ===
- Guangdong–Hainan Railway: Part of this railway is the Yuehai (粤海, i.e. Guangdong-Hainan) Ferry which crosses the Qiongzhou Strait, between Zhanjiang, Guangdong and Haikou, Hainan. The line has operated since January 2003, carrying both freight and passenger trains, enabling direct train service between the mainland and the cities of Haikou and Sanya on Hainan Island. As of the late 2010, two ferry boats were in operation; the third boat, Yuehai No. 3, was launched in Tianjin in September 2010, and was going to be delivered to the ferry company in December 2010.
- Bohai Train Ferry: Yantai in Shandong Province to Dalian in Liaoning Province. This short-cut line, operated by Sinorail, has been running since November 2006. As of 2020, it only carries freight trains, but passengers can also be on board the ship.
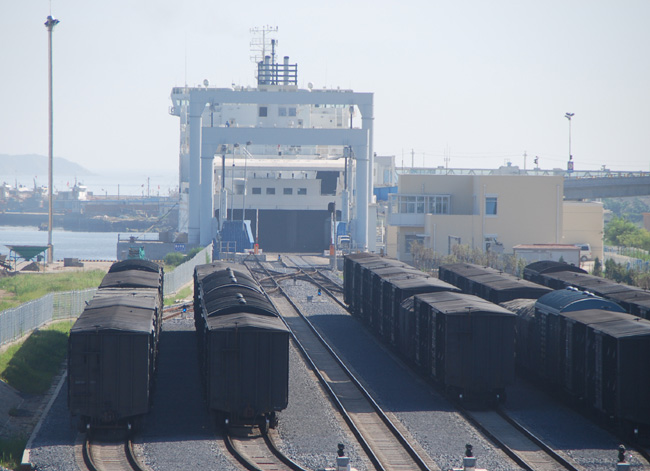
The Lüshun (Dalian) terminal of the Bohai Train Ferry

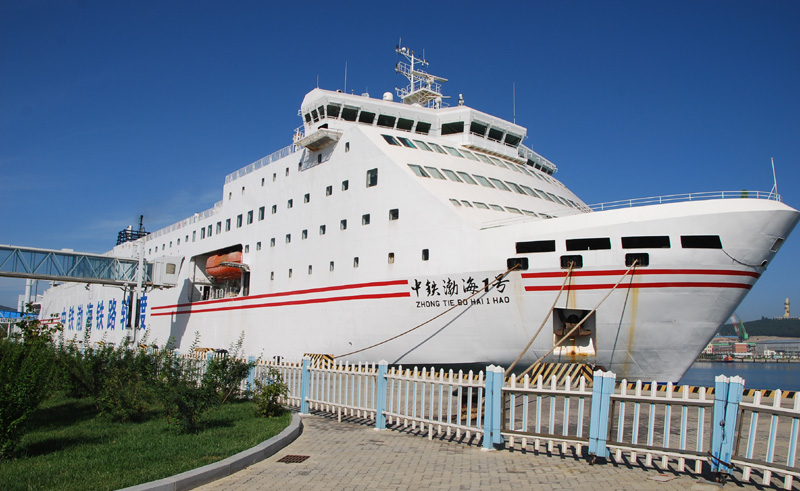
A Bohai Train Ferry vessel

=== Denmark ===
- Vogelfluglinie

=== Germany ===
- Vogelfluglinie
- Rostock – Trelleborg, Sweden (1994–2021). Since 2021 freight only (takes passenger cars and foot passengers also; night trains go over Great Belt bridge instead).

=== Georgia ===
- Russia to Georgia, bypasses Abkhazia.

=== Iran ===
A new train ferry link-span terminal is under construction at Amirabad Special Economic Zone, Mazandaran Province, Iran.

=== Italy ===
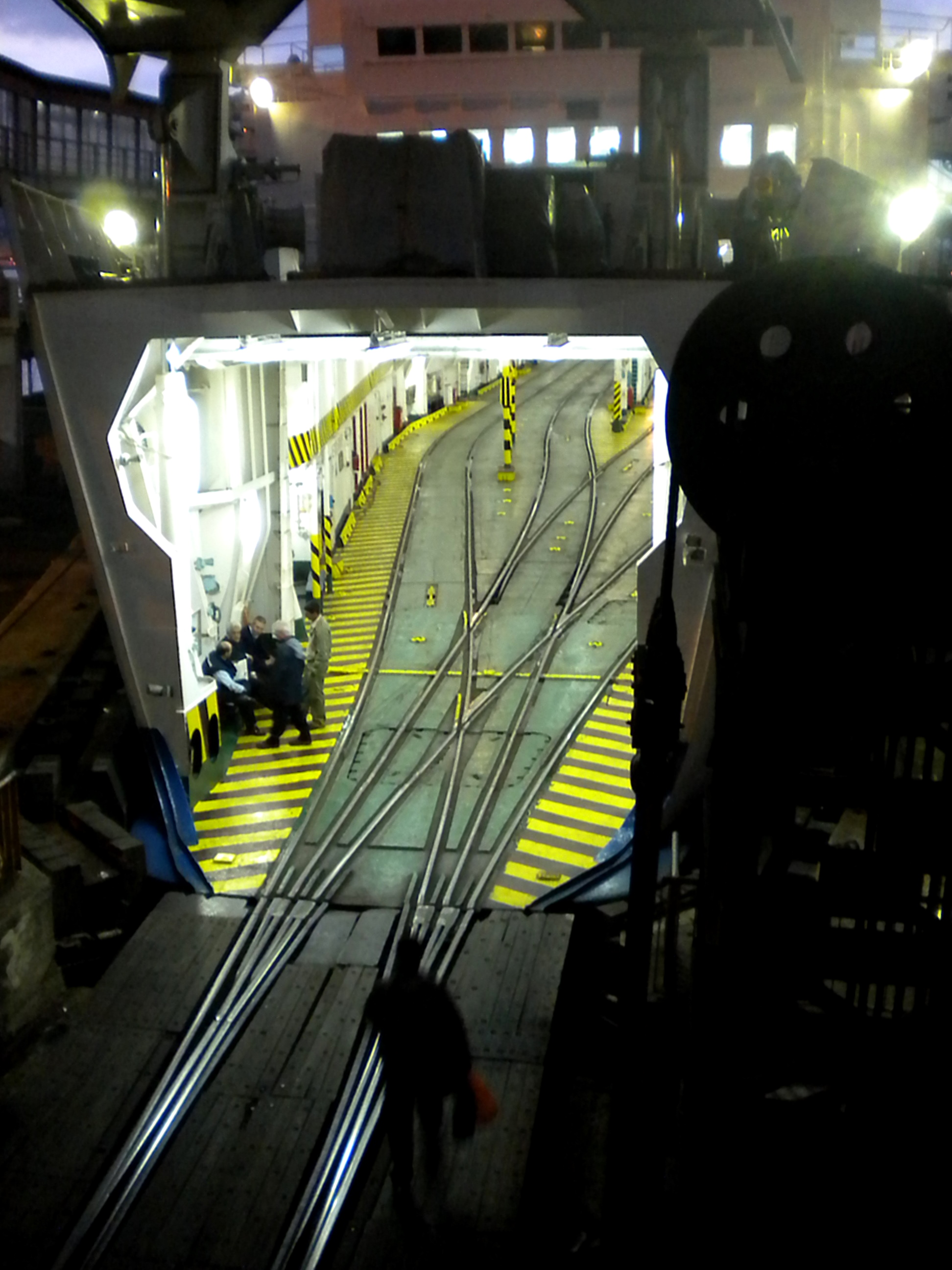
Train and car ferry between Calabria and Sicily

- Calabria-Sicily and vice versa: between the ports of Villa San Giovanni in the Region of Calabria and Messina in the Region of Sicily — passenger and freight service.

Both Sicily and Sardinia services are operated by Bluvia that is a subsidiary company of Rete Ferroviaria Italiana. At present the link between Mainland and Sicily has a regular and frequent activity, while the link between Mainland and Sardinia is less frequent and operated basically day by day on the basis of the actual traffic demand.

=== Kenya ===
A new and a refurbished train ferry between Kisumu, Kenya and Port Bell, Uganda across Lake Victoria.

=== Mexico ===
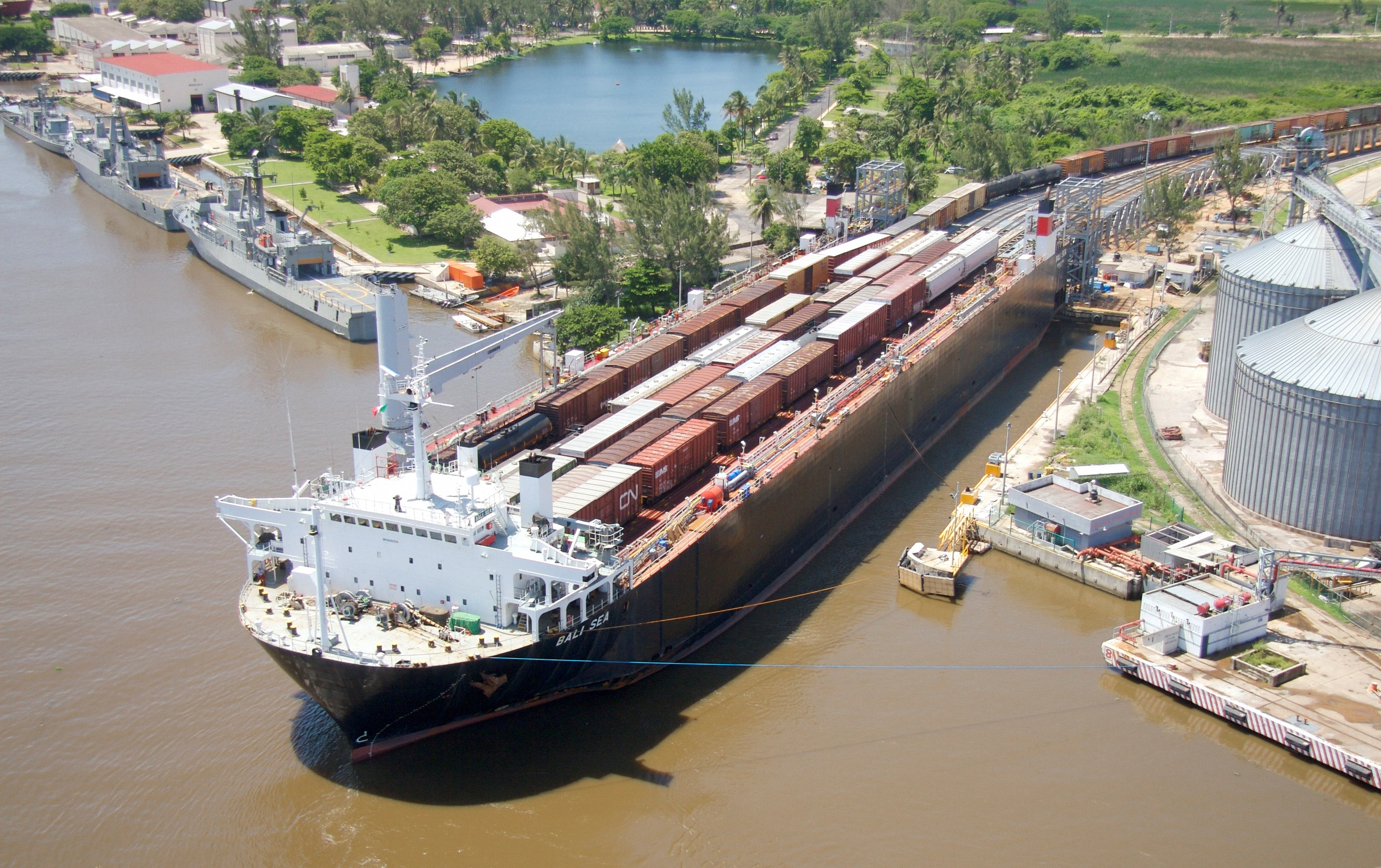
MV Bali Sea along the CG Railway loads up with Ferrosur trains in Coatzacoalcos

- CG Railway, connecting the Port of Mobile, Alabama, USA and Coatzacoalcos, Veracruz, Mexico. It is served by the BNSF, Canadian National, CSX, Kansas City Southern Railway and Norfolk Southern.

=== New Zealand ===
- The Interislander runs a train ferry (called rail ferries locally), Aratere, across Cook Strait between Wellington and Picton, carrying both road and rail cargo on separate decks. Kaitaki and Kaiārahi also serve this route, but carry road vehicles only.

=== Peru ===
- Link with Bolivia across Lake Titicaca. The car float Manco Capac has dual gauge tracks for both Peruvian 1,435 mm (4 ft 8 1/2 in) standard gauge and Bolivian 1,000 mm (3 ft 3 3/8 in) meter gauge. There are small stretches of dual gauge trackage at Puno in Peru and Guaqui in Bolivia. Car loading and unloading are done at docks. The British-built steamship Ollanta is no longer maintained, but PeruRail, in charge of the vessel, is trying to develop a tourist project soon.

=== Russia ===
- Vanino - Kholmsk, connecting Sakhalin Island with the mainland. (Since 1973). The ferry line is operated by the Sakhalin Shipping Company. Since Sakhalin railways use the Japanese gauge of 1,067 mm (3 ft 6 in), the railcars coming from the Russian mainland needed their bogies changed; this was done in Kholmsk. This break of gauge was removed once the Sakhalin railways had been converted to the Russian 1520 mm gauge in the late 2010s.
- Baltiysk to Ust-Luga
- Port Kavkaz to Port Krym, across the Kerch Strait

=== Sweden ===
- Trelleborg – Rostock, Germany (1994-), freight only
- Ystad - Świnoujście, Poland (2025-), freight only

=== Turkey ===
- Bosphorus: Train ferries used to connect the European railway network with main connections from Thessaloniki, Greece, and Bucharest, Romania terminating at the Sirkeci Terminal to the Asian network terminating at the Haydarpaşa Terminal. Closure of lines within Istanbul in both sides due to Marmaray project caused these ferry services to become useless since the beginning of 2012. Ferry service between Tekirdağ and Derince replaced this ferry service which started at the end of 2013. The current Marmaray Tunnel project, which was completed in 2013, partially replaced the ferry connection with an underwater railway tunnel running between the two sides.
- Black Sea: Chornomorsk, Ukraine to Derince, Turkey, bypasses a break of gauge
- Black Sea: Samsun, Turkey to Kavkaz, Russia: Launched in December 2010

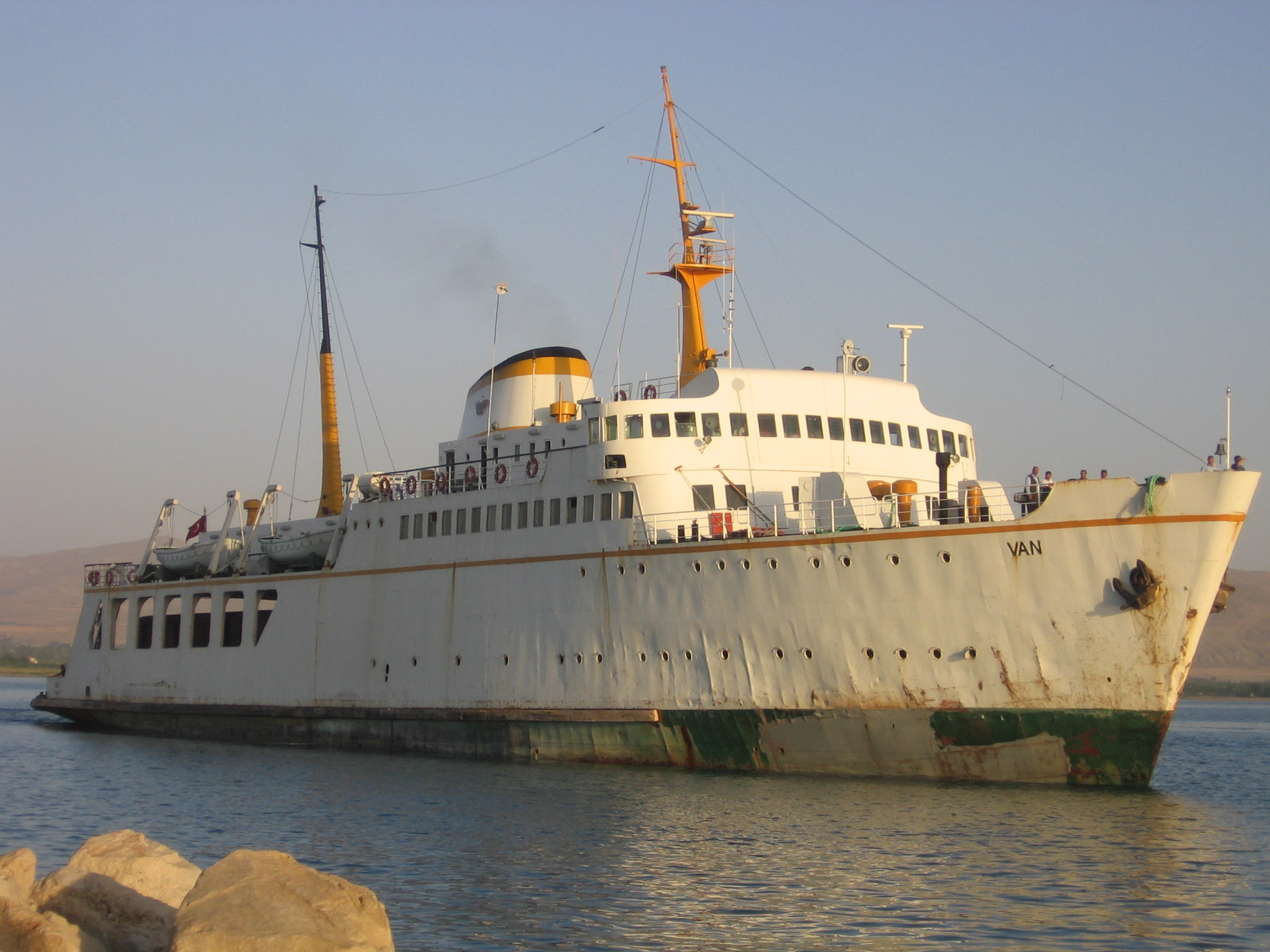
Ferry Van approaching Van harbour.

- Lake Van – Tatvan — Van. The Istanbul — Tehran "Trans-Asya-Ekspresi" operates and the Damascus–Tehran passenger train operated from each terminus to the ferry ports. Only the luggage van takes the ferry due to capacity restrictions, the passengers have to change at both ends. The Lake Van ferry is part of the planned Trans-Asian Railway, Istanbul — Singapore. A scheduled freight train runs from Istanbul to Kazakhstan. The train ferry was established to avoid an expensive railroad line along the mountainous southern shore and may be replaced when traffic increases sufficiently; there are reports of financing discussions between the governments of Turkey and Iran. The ferry route is 96 km (60 mi) long while a rail alternative on the north side would be 250 km (160 mi) long in mountainous terrain. There are four ferries each of 16 coach capacity capable of making three trips per day. Other sources describe the ferries' capacity as 450 tons (9 to 14 railcars).
- Tekirdağ-Derince Ferry: The ferry service had started at the end of 2013 connecting Europe to Asia by rail. The service is given by TCDD where a maritime company is the subcontractor. The ferry is MF Erdeniz, which used to carry wagons between Eregli and Zonguldak ports. She is now carrying wagons between Tekirdağ Port and Derince Port, İzmit. Ferry has 5 lines which are in total, 800 meters (2,600 ft) long. It can travel between Tekirdağ and Derince in 8 hours.
- Tekirdağ-Bandırma Ferry: TCDD is constructing another ferry ramp at Bandırma Port and is planning to give ferry service between Tekirdağ and Bandırma ports. This service will connect Agean Region of Turkey to Europe by rail.

=== Uganda ===
- A train ferry on Lake Victoria links the 1,000 mm (3 ft 3 3/8 in) gauge network of the Uganda Railway at Port Bell with the 1,000 mm gauge network of Tanzania at Mwanza. In June 2008, the Ugandan budget allocated $US8.5m for an additional train ferry for Lake Victoria to replace one that sank after a collision.

=== United States ===
- New York New Jersey Rail in New York City moves freight cars between Jersey City and Brooklyn. This car float operation provides a southern freight rail gateway to Brooklyn, Queens, and Long Island by avoiding the Selkirk Hurdle. The railroad carries a wide range of goods, including construction materials, food, and consumer products.
- The Alaska Railroad is connected to the rest of the North American rail system only via train ferries. The Alaska Railroad runs its own ferries from Whittier, Alaska to Seattle.
- Central Gulf Railroad, connecting the Port of Mobile, Alabama and Coatzacoalcos, Veracruz, Mexico. It is served by the BNSF Railway, Canadian National Railway, CSX Transportation, CPKC Railway, and the Norfolk Southern Railway.

== Former train ferries ==
=== Argentina ===
Nine train ferries were used between 1907 and 1990 to cross the Paraná river and join the Buenos Aires province (the main state in Argentina) and the Entre Rios province (the entrance to the Mesopotamian region), until new bridges were built over the rivers they crossed. They were Lucía Carbó (1907), María Parera (1908), Mercedes Lacroze (1909) (three ferries that operated between the ports of Zárate and Ibicuy (Entre Rios), crossing the Paraná River at the northwest of the Buenos Aires province). Then were added Roque Saenz Peña (1911) and Ezequiel Ramos Mejía (1913), paddle train ferries, at Posadas (crossing the Paraná River in the southwest of the Misiones province, at the north of the country, in the frontier with Paraguay).

Three other train ferries were added later: Dolores de Urquiza (1926), Delfina Mitre (1928) and Carmen Avellaneda (1929) to cover the service in the Zárate-Ibicuy crossing. María Parera had a collision with Lucía Carbó at km. 145 of the Paraná River, and it sank in less than 15 minutes on June 30, 1926. Two of the most modern still serve as floating piers in the Zárate region, and one of the first group was sunk during a storm at the Buenos Aires port in the 1980s. The two northern paddle ferries still remain at Posadas, and one of them holds a model railway museum inside. All the eight old ferries were built by the A & J Inglis, in Pointhouse, Glasgow, Scotland, for the Entre Rios Railways Co. in Argentina. The ninth ferry, Tabare, was built in Argentina by Astarsa in 1966 at Astillero Río Santiago Río Santiago Shipyard near to La Plata city. It was the largest train ferry that operated in Argentina, with a deck more than 100 meters long. Tabaré is still floating, but not operating, at the old south docks of Buenos Aires port, near the Puerto Madero zone.

=== Australia ===
- Grafton, New South Wales, over Clarence River pending construction of bridge, 1920s to 1932.

=== Bangladesh ===
- Narayanganj–Bahadurabad Ghat line from Balashi Ghat to Bahadurabad Ghat – 1,000 mm (3 ft 3 3/8 in) gauge across the Brahmaputra River in Bangladesh – passenger services superseded by Jamuna Bridge, 2003; 1,676 mm (5 ft 6 in) and 1,000 mm (3 ft 3 3/8 in) dual gauge. Limited freight transportation continued until 2010.

=== Belgium ===
- Former link from Zeebrugge to Harwich, England – ceased in 1987.

=== Canada ===
Car floats

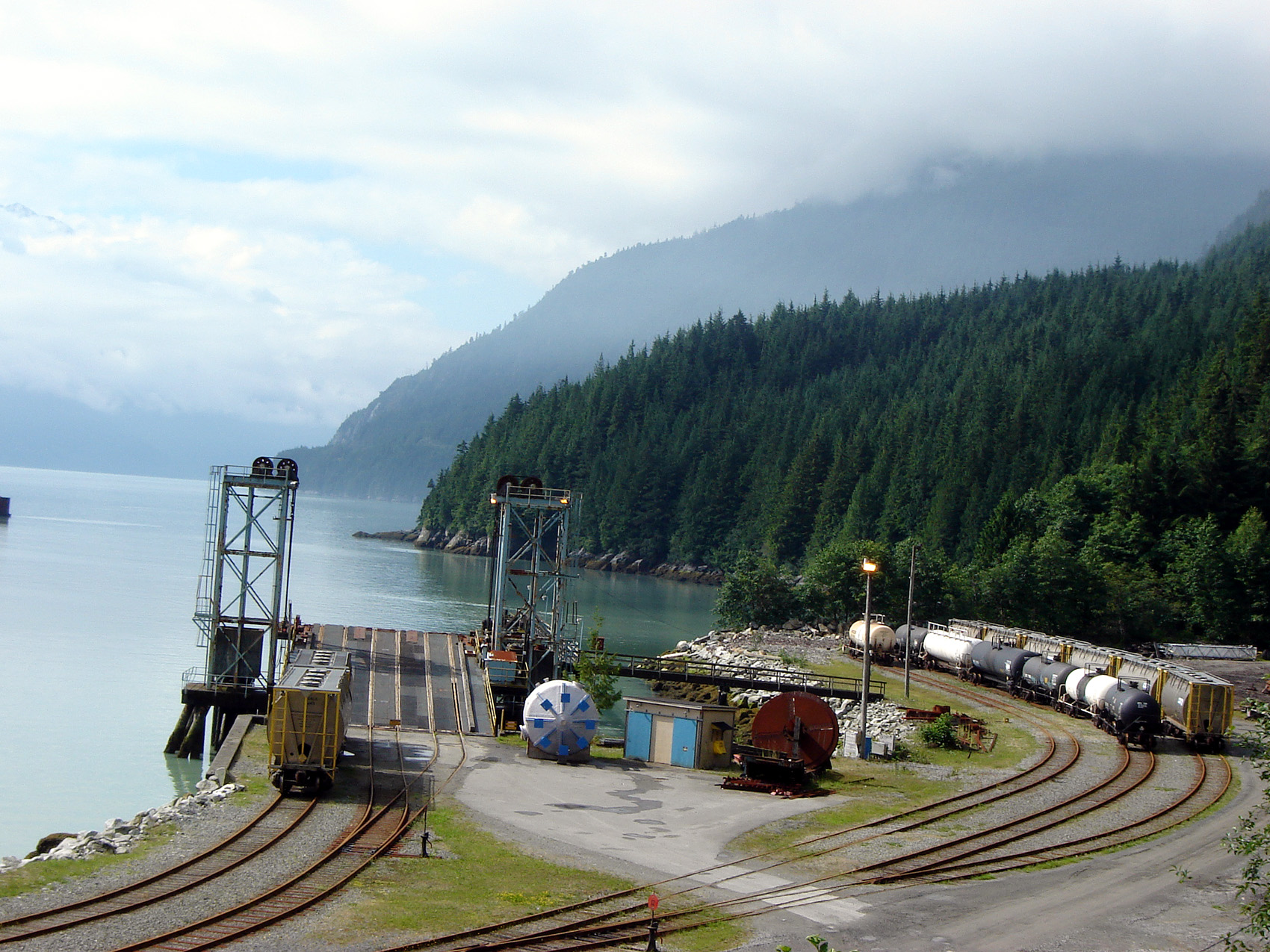
Woodfibre, British Columbia

- Prince Rupert, British Columbia – Whittier, Alaska (Aquatrain) Service ended in April 2021.
- lakes of British Columbia Okanagan, Arrow, Kootenay lakes (Canadian National and Canadian Pacific)
- Port Maitland, Ontario – Ashtabula, Ohio (TH&B Navigation Company)
- Port Burwell, Ontario – Ashtabula, Ohio (CN)
- Cobourg, Ontario – Rochester, New York (Ontario Car Ferry Company) ran from 1905 to 1950
- Sarnia, Ontario – Port Huron, Michigan – rail-barge – (CN, until the opening of the Paul Tellier Tunnel)
- Windsor, Ontario – Detroit, Michigan (Grand Trunk, CN, CPR, Michigan Central, Wabash, until the 1980s)
- BC Rail. Until 1952, railcars were barged from North Vancouver to Squamish until the completion of the railway between North Vancouver and Squamish.
- A large number of isolated BC pulp mills had chemicals and freight moved by railbarge.
- At one time a car float came to Ogden Point. from the Victoria Harbour

Train ferries

- Cape Tormentine, New Brunswick – Borden-Carleton, Prince Edward Island (Canadian Government Railways, CN, CN Marine, Marine Atlantic), using MV Abegweit and MV John Hamilton Gray. Service ended when rail service on Prince Edward Island was discontinued in 1989.
- Mulgrave, Nova Scotia – Point Tupper, Nova Scotia (Intercolonial, CN, until the opening of the Canso Causeway in 1955)
- North Sydney, Nova Scotia – Port aux Basques, Newfoundland (CN, CN Marine). Service commenced in 1965 carrying standard-gauge rolling stock. A dual-gauge yard in Port aux Basques was used for classification and rolling stock had trucks exchanged with narrow gauge trucks. Service ended when the Newfoundland section of Canadian National Railway was closed in 1988.
- Lake Superior, Thunder Bay – Superior, Wisconsin.
- Sarnia, Canada – Port Huron, Michigan, United States – replaced by tunnel under St. Clair River c. 1891.
- Ashtabula a train ferry that traveled between Ashtabula, Ohio, on the south shore of Lake Erie, to Port Burwell, Ontario, on the north shore.

=== China ===
- Tang Jiang (Tang River) in Guangdong Province on the former Xin Ning ("Sunning") Railway. This privately funded and built railway including its extensions was constructed between 1906 and 1920 running between Jiangmen ("Kongmoon") and Taishan ("Toishan") & Doushan ( Towshan"). Entire trains crossed the river on a 350 ft long steel pontoon at a river crossing point near to Niu Wan. The ferry was replaced by a rail bridge constructed between 1934 -1936 only to be destroyed in 1938 when the rails of the entire railway were lifted to prevent the advance of the invading Japanese forces.
- Yangtze River in Wuhan before construction of the Wuhan Yangtze River Bridge. Hunslet Engine Company built two extra heavy 0-8-0 locomotives for loading the train ferries.
- Yangtze River in Nanjing on Jinghu railway, 1933–1968.
- Huangpu River in Minhang on Wujing–Zhoujiadu Railway
- Yangtze River in Wuhu on Huainan railway, before 2000.
- Jiangyin Train Ferry on the Xinyi–Changxing Railway (freight only). Trains were carried from Jingjiang on the northern side of the Yangtze River (terminal at 31°58′33″N 120°18′27″E) to Jiangyin on the southern side (terminal at 31°57′16″N 120°19′25″E). A pair of ferries made 48 trips per day across the river. The service ended on 16 December 2019.

=== Cuba ===
Note: all auto and rail ferry services have been suspended between the United States and Cuba due to the ongoing United States embargo against Cuba.

- Palm Beach – Havana, Cuba.
- Miami – Havana, Cuba
- New Orleans – Havana, Cuba
- New York – Havana – Seatrain Lines

=== Denmark ===
- Rødby – Puttgarden, Germany across Fehmarn Belt. 1963–2019, Vogelfluglinie. To be replaced by Fehmarn Belt Fixed Link in 2028. Not used by freight trains since 1997; they go over the Great Belt Bridge instead. Night trains used the ferry until 1997.
- Strib – Fredericia, 1872–1935, replaced by Little Belt Bridge
- Korsør – Nyborg, 1883–1997, replaced by the Great Belt Fixed Link
- Oddesund Syd – Oddesund Nord, 1883–1938, replaced by Oddesund Bridge
- Masnedø – Orehoved, 1884–1937, replaced by Storstrøm Bridge
- Glyngøre – Nykøbing Mors, 1889–1977
- Helsingør – Helsingborg, Sweden, 1892–2000, since then car ferry only
- Copenhagen Frihavn – Malmö, Sweden, 1895–1986
- Gedser – Warnemünde, Germany, 1903–1995, replaced by car ferry Gedser – Rostock, Germany
- Faaborg – Mommark, 1922–1962, freight only
- Assens – Aarøsund, 1923–1950, freight only, narrow gauge (1,000 mm or 3 ft 3 3/8 in)
- Svendborg – Rudkøbing, 1926–1962, freight only
- Hvalpsund – Sundsøre, 1927–1969, since then car ferry only
- Svendborg – Ærøskøbing, 1931–1994, freight only
- Gedser – Großenbrode Kai, Germany, 1951–1963, replaced by Rødby — Puttgarden Ferry
- Hirtshals – Kristiansand, Norway, 1958–1996, freight only
- Copenhagen Frihavn – Helsingborg, Sweden (Danlink) 1986–2000, freight only
- Frederikshavn – Gothenburg, Sweden, 1987–2015, freight only

=== Finland ===
- Stockholm – Naantali (1967–75), 1,435 mm (4 ft 8 1/2 in) standard gauge on board, break of gauge to 1,524 mm (5 ft) in Naantali, freight only
- Travemünde – Hanko (1975–98), 1,435 mm (4 ft 8 1/2 in) on board, break of gauge to 1,524 mm (5 ft) in Hanko, freight only
- Travemünde – Turku (1998–2007), 1,435 mm (4 ft 8 1/2 in) on board, break of gauge to 1,524 mm (5 ft) in Turku, freight only
- Hargshamn (Sweden) – Uusikaupunki (1989–96), 1,435 mm (4 ft 8 1/2 in) on board, break of gauge to 1,524 mm (5 ft) in Uusikaupunki, freight only
- Turku – Stockholm (-2012,), 1,435 mm (4 ft 8 1/2 in) on board, break of gauge to 1,524 mm (5 ft) in Turku, freight only

=== France ===
- Calais and Dunkirk from Richborough, England, between 1918 and 1919 transporting war material to the Front
- Dieppe from Southampton, United Kingdom between 1918 and 1919 transporting war material to the Front
- Dunkerque to Dover, United Kingdom – ceased in 1995 due to the opening of the Channel Tunnel.

=== Germany ===
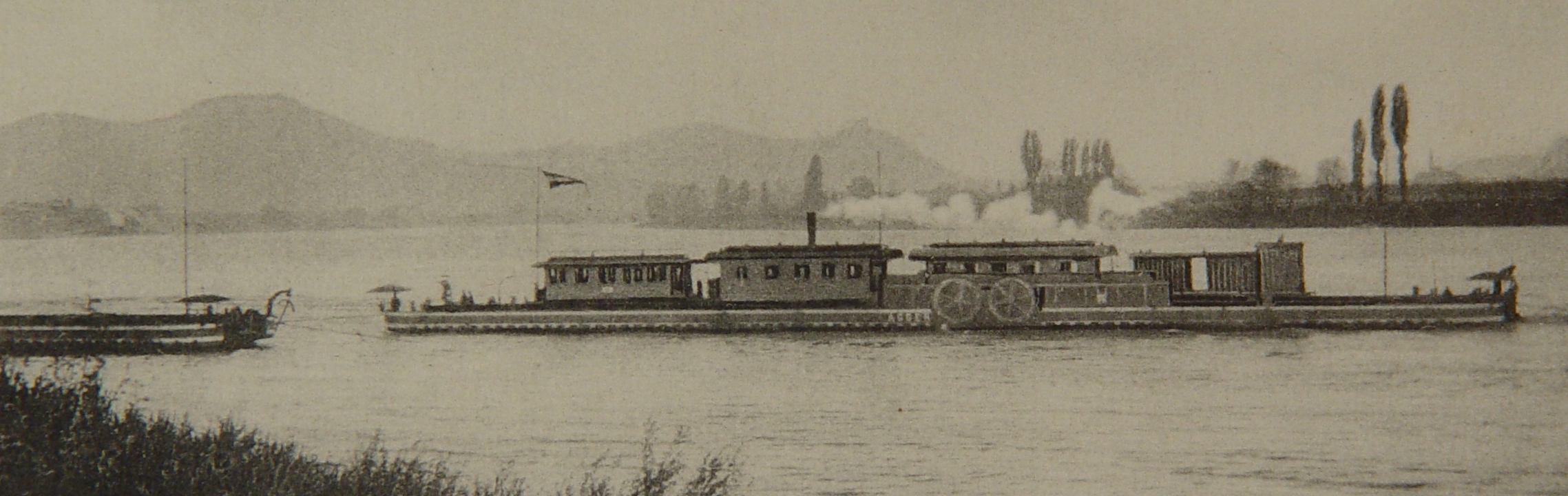
Bonn–Oberkassel train ferry

- Constance (Bodensee) (1869–1976)
- Grossenbrode – Fehmarnsund (1903–1963)
- Grossenbrode – Gedser (1951–1963)
- Elbe: Lauenburg–Hohnstorf (1864–1878)
- Elbe: Köhlbrand, Hamburg (1912–1974)
- Mukran – Klaipėda, Lithuania, break of gauge, 1,520 mm (4 ft 11 27/32 in) broad gauge on board, freight only (1986–2013)
- Mukran (changed in 1988 from the old Sassnitz port to the new port nearby at Mukran) – Trelleborg, Sweden, freight plus one daily passenger night-train. (1909–2020)
- Mukran – Ust-Luga, Russia, break of gauge, 1,520 mm (4 ft 11 27/32 in) broad gauge on board, freight only (2012–2016)
- Puttgarden – Rødby, Denmark (1963–2019) Not used by night and freight trains since 1997 (they go over the Great Belt Bridge instead). To be replaced by Fehmarn Belt Fixed Link in 2028.
- Rhine: Worms–Rosengarten (1870–1900)
- Rhine: Bingerbrück–Rüdesheim (1861–1900)
- Rhine: Bonn–Oberkassel (1870–1914)
- Rhine: Rheinhausen–Hochfeld (1866–1874)
- Rhine: Ruhrort–Homberg (1852–1912)
- Rhine: Spyck–Welle (1865–1912)
- Stralsund – Altefähr/Rügen replaced 1936 by the Rügendamm.
- Travemünde – Hanko (1975–1998), 1,435 mm (4 ft 8 1/2 in) standard gauge on board, break of gauge in Hanko, freight only
- Travemünde – Turku (1998–2007), 1,435 mm (4 ft 8 1/2 in) on board, break of gauge in Turku, freight only
- Travemünde – Malmö
- Warnemünde – Gedser (1903–1995), replaced by car ferry Rostock – Gedser
- Wittow Fähre – Fährhof 1896–1968, operated by the Rügen Light Railway (750 mm or 2 ft 5 1/2 in).
- Wolgast – Wolgaster Fähre (Usedom), 1945−1990 (only freight)

=== Hungary ===
- Between current Bogojevo, Serbia and Dalj, Croatia, over the Danube river 1871–1911.

=== Iraq ===
Train ferries were at one time used to cross the Euphrates River at Baghdad.

=== Italy ===
- Mainland to Sicily: crossing the Strait of Messina, between Messina and Villa San Giovanni
- Mainland to Sardinia: between the ports of Civitavecchia and Golfo Aranci – freight service stopped in 2009,.
- Mainland to station and the factory in the city: between the station of Venezia Santa Lucia and the city – freight service only by barge
- Paratico-Sarnico to Lovere on Lake Iseo,

=== Japan ===
In Japanese, a train ferry is called "鉄道連絡船 tetsudō renrakusen", which means literally "railway connection ship". Such ships may or may not be able to carry railcars. A ferry service that is part of a railway schedule and its fare system is called "tetsudō renrakusen".

Japan Railways linked the four main Japanese islands with train ferries before these were replaced by bridges and tunnels.

There were three ferry services that carried trains. Through operations of passenger trains using train ferries were conducted between December 1948 and 11 May 1955. The passenger services was canceled after the disasters of Toya Maru (26 September 1954, killed 1,153) and the Shiun Maru (11 May 1955, killed 168) occurred, after which the Japanese National Railways (JNR) considered it dangerous to allow passengers to stay on trains aboard ship. These three lines have been replaced by tunnels and bridges.

- Seikan Ferry

The Seikan ferry connected Aomori Station and Hakodate Station crossing the Tsugaru Strait connecting Honshū and Hokkaidō. The first full-scale train ferry, Shōhō Maru, entered service in April, 1924. On 13 March 1988, the Seikan Tunnel was opened and the ferry ceased operation. The tunnel and the ferry line was operated simultaneously only on that day.

- Ukō Ferry

The Ukō ferry connected Uno station and Takamatsu station crossing the Seto Inland Sea connecting Honshū and Shikoku. The ferry service started carrying railcars on 10 October 1921. On 9 April 1988, the Great Seto Bridge was opened and the last train ferry operated on the previous day.

- Kammon Ferry

The Kammon ferry connected Shimonoseki Station and Mojikō Station crossing the Kanmon Strait connecting Honshū and Kyūshū. This was the first train ferry service in Japan starting operation on 1 October 1911. The train ferries used piers at Komorie station. After the completion of the Kanmon Tunnel on 1 July 1942, the service was discontinued and the ferries were transferred to the Ukō Ferry operation.

=== Lithuania ===
- Klaipėda, 1,520 mm (4 ft 11 27/32 in) – Mukran, Germany, 1,435 mm (4 ft 8 1/2 in) (1986-2016). Freight only. Bogie exchanges take place in Mukran. Service abandoned in 2016.

=== The Netherlands ===
From 1886 to 1936, train ferries sailed between Stavoren and Enkhuizen across the Zuiderzee. After completion of the Afsluitdijk in 1932, goods transportation went from train to road.

From 1914 to 1983 a ferry carried freight carriages from the Rietlanden shunting area to the Amsterdam-Noord railway network, which was not connected over land to the rest of the Dutch railway network.

=== Nigeria ===
- A temporary ferry was used at the crossing of the Niger River due to delays finding foundations for a bridge.
- similarly at Makurdi on the River Benue, replaced by a road-rail bridge in 1932.

=== Norway ===
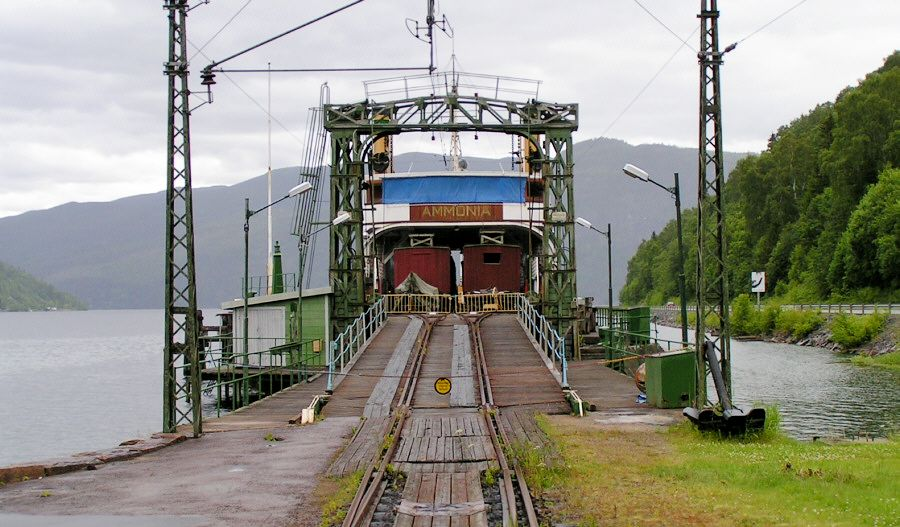
The Tinnsjø railway ferry, Norway

- Historically the lake Tinnsjø railway ferry (1909–1991) linked the Tinnoset Line and Rjukan Line, transporting goods to and from Rjukan and the Norsk Hydro heavy water factory, as seen in the film The Heroes of Telemark, starring Kirk Douglas.
- Hirtshals, Denmark–Kristiansand, Norway, 1958–1996, freight only

=== Paraguay ===
- Link to Argentina – replaced by bridge over Rio Parana c. 1985.

Encarnacion — Posadas

=== Russia & former USSR ===
- Kerch Strait ferry line from Port Kavkaz to Port Krym, across the Kerch Strait. Operated from 1953 to 1993. In 2004, service restored as a car ferry so far; possibility of carrying rail cars is studied as well.
- SS Baikal was a train ferry which operated on Lake Baikal in the early 1900s between Port Baikal and Mysovaya, filling a gap in the Transsiberian Railway before the completion of the Circum-Baikal Railway around the lake.
- Baltijsk to Sassnitz-Mukran (Germany) (2008–2016)
- Ust-Luga to Sassnitz-Mukran (Germany) (2012–2016)
- Saratov to Engels across the Volga river (1896-1935)

=== Sweden ===
- Gothenburg – Frederikshavn, Denmark (1987–2015)
- Helsingør, Denmark – Helsingborg (1892–2000)
- Copenhagen, Denmark – Helsingborg (1986–2000), freight only
- Copenhagen, Denmark – Malmö (1895–1986)
- Trelleborg – Gdansk, Poland (1946)
- Trelleborg – Gdynia, Poland (1947–1950)
- Trelleborg – Sassnitz (Mukran port), Germany, (1998–2020) operated by Stena Line
- Trelleborg – Świnoujście, Poland (1948–1953), was supposed to replace the Ystad – Świnoujście service in 2010 again, but that didn't happen
- Trelleborg – Warnemünde, the GDR (1948–1953)
- Ystad – Świnoujście, Poland (1974-2018), freight only
- Bergkvara – Mörbylånga, normal gauge 1,435 mm (4 ft 8 1/2 in) between 1,067 mm (3 ft 6 in) in Bergkvara and 891 mm in Mörbylånga (1953–1955)
- Kalmar – Färjestaden, narrow gauge 891 mm (1957–1962)
- Stockholm – Naantali, Finland (1967–1975), normal gauge on board, break-of-gauge in Naantali, freight only
- Malmö – Travemünde, Germany (from the mid-1980s until a few years after 2000)
- Hargshamn (Sweden) – Uusikaupunki (1989–96), normal gauge on board, break-of-gauge in Uusikaupunki, freight only
- Stockholm – Turku, Finland (SeaRail, ended 2012, normal gauge 1,435 mm (4 ft 8 1/2 in))

Never opened

- Trelleborg – Travemünde, the ferries were built (Nils Dacke and Robin Hood 1988–89) but the service never opened, as the "Iron Curtain" fell. The ferries were supposed to offer an alternative, which was not going through East Germany, to the ferries from Rostock and Sassnitz, which were in East Germany. With reunification that aim became obsolete.

=== United Kingdom ===
- Richborough to Calais and Dunkirk between 1918 and 1919 transporting war material to the Front
- Southampton to Dieppe between 1918 and 1919 transporting war material to the Front
- Harwich to Zeebrugge, Belgium – ceased in 1987.
- Dover - Dunkerque, France – ceased in 1995 due to the opening of the Channel Tunnel. The last Night Ferry passenger train ran on 31 October 1980.
- Langston to Bembridge. A short-lived route of the 1880s operated by The Isle of Wight Railway Marine Transit Company, then the London, Brighton & South Coast Railway (after the IoWRMTC's finances got in a bad state), using the former Tay ferry Carrier to link with the Isle of Wight Railway.
- The Firths of Tay and Forth in Scotland were crossed by train ferries (Tayport–Broughty Ferry and Granton–Burntisland) until their replacement by bridges.

=== United States ===
- The Canadian National operated its Aquatrain between Whittier and Prince Rupert, British Columbia. Service ended in April 2021.

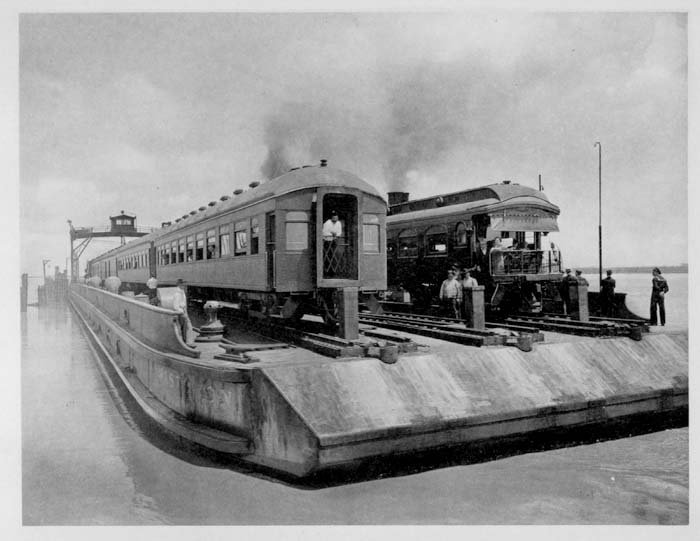
Southern Pacific Railroad in New Orleans

- Brooklyn Eastern District Terminal used car floats.
- Chesapeake Bay – New York, Philadelphia & Norfolk Railroad Ferry from Norfolk to Cape Charles, Virginia, to the early 1940s.
- Chesapeake Bay – Virginia Ferry Corporation from Little Creek, Virginia to Cape Charles, Virginia.
- Chesapeake Bay – Bay Coast Railroad from Norfolk to Cape Charles, Virginia. The shortline railroad had two ferries (25 & 15 cars each) that crossed the Chesapeake Bay about twice a week.
- Lake Michigan – Frankfort, Michigan, to Manitowoc, Kewaunee, Marinette, Wisconsin, or Manistique, Michigan, was the Ann Arbor Railroad's Lake Michigan car ferry service that discontinued in the 1980s. Ann Arbor operated Viking and Arthur K. Atkinson as the final ships on the fleet.
- Lake Michigan – Ludington, Michigan to Manitowoc, Kewaunee or Milwaukee, Wisconsin served by the Pere Marquette Railway and successor Chesapeake and Ohio or Chessie System with the ships SS City of Midland 41 of 1940, SS Spartan and SS Badger, both built in 1953. Badger is now used as an automobile ferry between Manitowoc, Wisconsin, and Ludington, Michigan and represents one of the last large coal-burning passenger-carrying steamers in the world.
- Lake Michigan – Milwaukee, Wisconsin, to Muskegon or Grand Haven, Michigan, was the Lake Michigan car ferry service of the Grand Trunk Western Railroad which was run by its subsidiary company Grand Trunk Milwaukee Car Ferry Company. Its fleet included five ships including SS City of Milwaukee, built in 1931.
- Straits of Mackinac: – Mackinaw City, Michigan, to St. Ignace, Michigan, performed by SS Chief Wawatam at the Straits of Mackinac connecting Michigan's Upper and Lower Peninsulas.
- San Francisco Bay – The San Francisco Belt Railroad had slip at Pier 43 which allowed interchange with the Northwestern Pacific, the Western Pacific, and the Atchison, Topeka & Santa Fe railroads.
- Carquinez Strait – The Central Pacific Railroad operated two train ferries (later assumed by its affiliate the Southern Pacific) between Benicia and Port Costa, California from 1879 to 1930. Solano and Contra Costa were the largest train ferries ever built.
- Pittsburg, California San Francisco–Sacramento Railroad Sacramento Northern Railway – the trolley-wire-powered "South End" operated from Sacramento south through farmland, marshes, over river by its own ferry, to Pittsburg, through the Contra Costa County hills and tunnel to Oakland and the Key System ferry pier. In 1928 the San Francisco-Sacramento Railroad (formerly the Oakland, Antioch and Eastern Railway, and originally the Oakland and Antioch Railway) became the Southern Division of the SNRy.
- New York City – Havana, Cuba
- Detroit Train Ferry Yard – Google Maps Aerial Photo of the former yard
- Mackinac Transportation Company
- Ashtabula a train ferry that traveled between Ashtabula, Ohio, on the south shore of Lake Erie, to Port Burwell, Ontario, on the north shore.

== Proposed train ferries ==
The Trans-Asian Railway has proposed a few train ferries:

- between Sri Lanka and India – same gauge 1,676 mm (5 ft 6 in) (Boat mail)
- Penang in Malaysia and Belawan in Sumatra, Indonesia – break of gauge 1,000 mm (3 ft 3 3/8 in) metre gauge/1,067 mm (3 ft 6 in)
- Yantai, China – Pyeongtaek, South Korea – same gauge 1,435 mm (4 ft 8 1/2 in) standard gauge
- Samsun, Turkey – Poti, Georgia - break of gauge 1,435 mm (4 ft 8 1/2 in)/1,520 mm (4 ft 11 27/32 in)
