= Ruhrort–Homberg train ferry =

German train ferry

Coordinates: 51°27′16″N 6°43′1″E

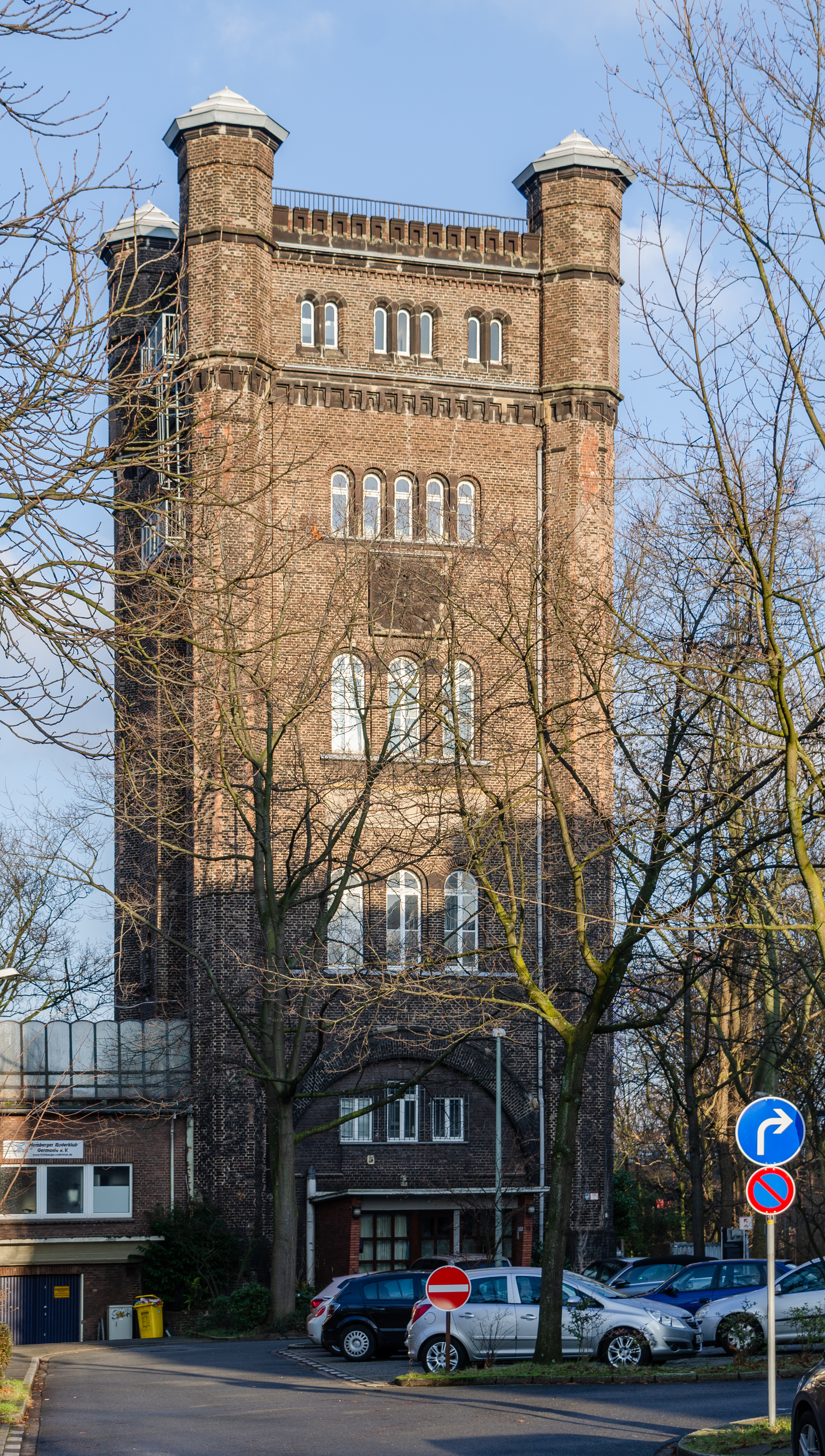
The tower of the former ferry in Duisburg-Homberg

The Ruhrort–Homberg train ferry was a German train ferry on the Rhine between Ruhrort and Homberg, now districts of Duisburg.

== History ==
While the Cologne-Minden Railway Company (Cöln-Mindener Eisenbahn-Gesellschaft, CME) was building its trunk line between Cologne and Minden via Duisburg between 1843 and 1847, the shareholders of the Ruhrort-Crefeld District Gladbach Railway Company (Ruhrort–Crefeld−Kreis Gladbach Eisenbahngesellschaft, RCG) were looking for a way to bring coal from the Ruhr to industries on the western bank of the Rhine cheaply. Technology had not yet developed for building a bridge over the Rhine. In addition, prior to the Austro-Prussian War, the Prussian military opposed the building of a fixed bridge across the Rhine for military reasons, except in fortified cities such as Cologne, Mainz, Koblenz and Düsseldorf. Therefore, the RCG decided to build a train ferry between its left (western) bank terminus in Homberg and the right bank port of Ruhrort.

=== Construction of the railway lines ===
On 29 March 1847 the RCG entered into a contract with the CME to connect the lines of both companies and for the transport of passenger carriages and freight wagons across the Rhine. In May 1847, the RCG began construction of its line from Viersen via Krefeld to Homberg, which was opened on 15 October 1849. The CME completed its branch line from Oberhausen to Ruhrort on 14 October 1848.

=== Construction of ramps ===
Lack of experience in Germany with train ferries led the RCG to begin the movement of wagons with a simple system of ramps, but using imported facilities that had not been tested in advance. On both sides wagons were lowered, initially using chains and later ropes, from the top of the river banks down a slope of 1 in 12 to the edge of pontoon docks—these railway basins still exist. The wagons were then moved on to pontoons over rails that had been temporarily installed over the water. On the other side the wagons were towed up the ramp by a locomotive using the same system of chains or ropes.

Each pontoon could carry three wagons. They were attached on both sides of a small steamer and crossed the Rhine for the first time on 12 November 1852. Despite the problems caused by ice and floods and in spite of many breaks of chains and ropes, the ferry initially moved up to 700 carriages and wagons each month. In 1855 32,000 wagons were moved across the Rhine, but this was the limit of capacity.

=== Construction of the hydraulic lifting system ===
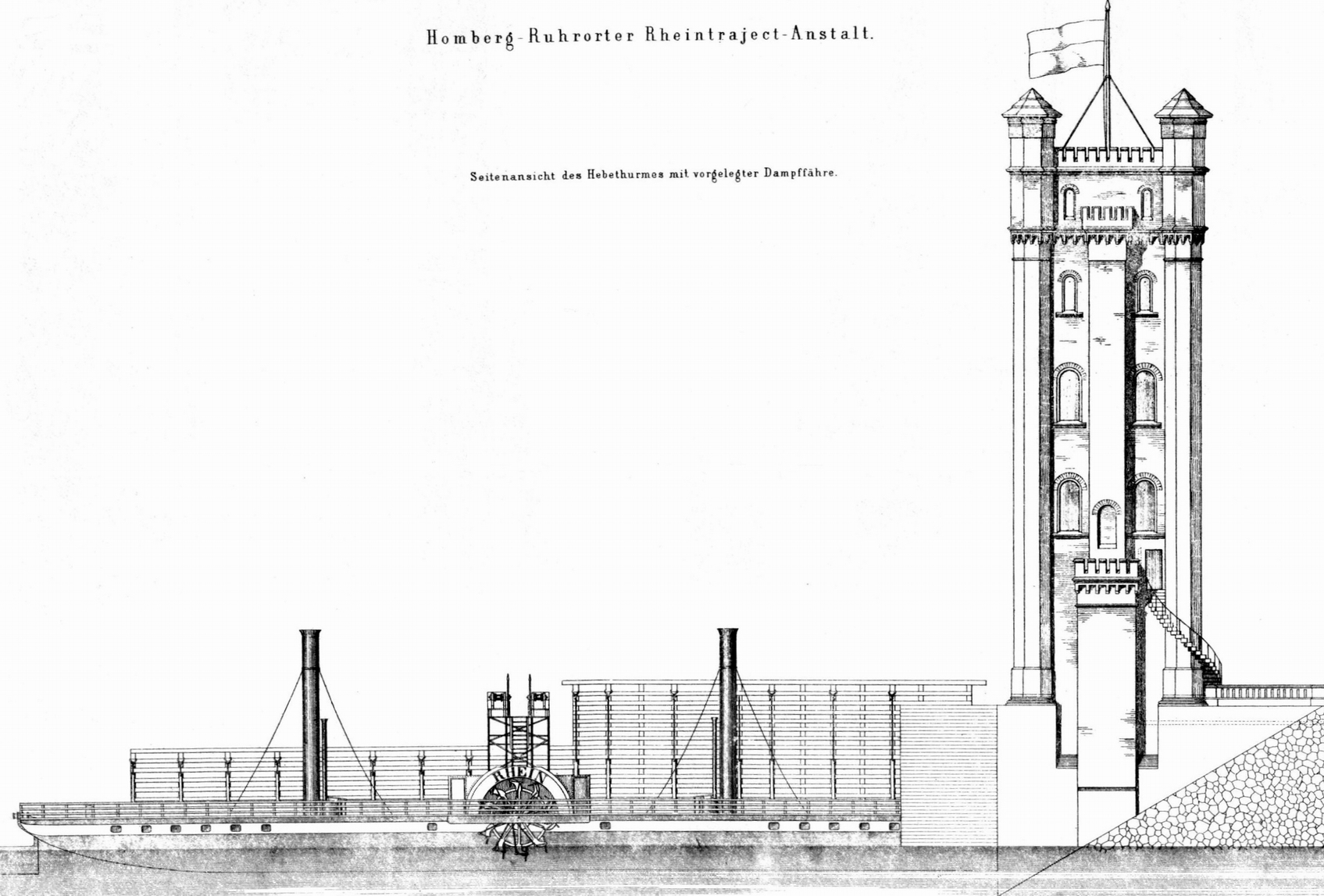
Homberg-Ruhrort train ferry, sideview of the lift tower with steam ferry "Rhein".

To increase throughput the railway company decided to build on both banks in addition to the ramps a tower with a hydraulically actuated lift. The plants were supplied and installed by an English company. Two freight wagons or passenger carriages could be carried up to 8.5 metres up or down.

A purpose-built 52 metre long and 8 metre wide steamer could carry twelve freight wagons or four carriages on every trip. The ship had four steam boilers and a tall chimney on each side. Inside there were rooms in the ship for the passengers who did not remain in the carriages.

The construction of the lift systems began in the summer of 1854 and went into service on 1 May 1856. In the same year 47,050 cars were carried. On peak traffic days, parallel operations continued on the ramps. However, there were several significant disruptions as a result of storms, ice and floods.

== Takeover by the BME ==
After the Bergisch-Märkische Railway Company (Bergisch-Märkische Eisenbahn-Gesellschaft, BME) took over the company on 1 January 1866 (which until then had been owned by the Royal Division of the Aachen-Düsseldorf-Ruhrort Railway Company, Königliche Direction der Aachen-Düsseldorf-Ruhrorter Eisenbahn), it started major repairs and improvements to increase the efficiency of the train ferry service. The ramps were lowered to a 1 in 24 grade so that longer vehicles could be loaded. With the commissioning of another ferry, the capacity of the train ferry operation was increased to 100,000 wagons annually.

After the opening of the new coal line by the Rhenish Railway Company (Rheinischen Eisenbahn-Gesellschaft, RhE) from Osterath near Krefeld via Rheinhausen to Essen, including the Rheinhausen–Hochfeld train ferry, on 23 August 1866 and especially after the opening of the Duisburg–Hochfeld rail bridge in 1874, the BME’s train ferry lost traffic until the nationalisation of the private railway companies in 1881.

In 1881 about 80,000 wagons were still carried by train ferry. The BME rebuilt one of the lift towers in 1876 after a fire.

== Closure ==
The Royal Prussian State Railways (Königlich Preußische Staatseisenbahnen) took over the BME in 1882. According to various sources train ferry operations were discontinued on 1 April 1885. An ordinary ferry service continued to operate for passenger until the opening of the Homberg–Ruhrort road bridge in 1907.

The dilapidated lift tower at the Ruhrort site was demolished in 1971. Its counterpart in Homberg still stands and was occasionally used as a Youth Hostel. It is now part of The Industrial Heritage Trail.
