= Bonn–Oberkassel train ferry =

Coordinates: 50°43′05″N 7°08′28″E

Overview
- Native name: Trajekt Bonn–Oberkassel
- Owner: Rhenish Railway Company

Service
- Type: train ferry

History
- Opened: 1870
- Closed: 1 January 1919

Technical
- Line length: 5.9 km (3.7 mi)

The Bonn–Oberkassel train ferry was a German train ferry operated by the Rhenish Railway Company from 1870 to connect its right and left Rhine railways. It was the last of six train ferries to begin operations across the Rhine in Germany and the second to last to close.

== Construction of the railway ==
After the take over of the Bonn–Cologne Railway Company (German: Bonn-Cölner Eisenbahn) by the Rhenish Railway Company (Rheinische Eisenbahngesellschaft, RhE) on 1 January 1857, it built the left Rhine railway in sections to Bingerbrück. With the opening of the last section on 15 December 1859, it connected to the Hessian Ludwig Railway to South Germany. In 1864, it built the Pfaffendorfer Rhine bridge below the Ehrenbreitstein Fortress and the bridge over the Lahn at Oberlahnstein to connect with the Nassau Rhine Railway (Nassauische Rheinbahn) of the Nassau State Railway (Nassauische Staatsbahn) at Niederlahnstein, completed on 3 June 1864, creating a second railway next to the Rhine from the Rhineland to southern Germany, now known as the Left Rhine line. The Prussian Government encouraged the Rhenish Railway to extend the right bank railway from Niederlahnstein to Oberkassel (opposite Bonn and Troisdorf). The company was also given a concession to connect the new line with the left Rhine railway with Bonn by means of a train ferry.

== Construction of the train ferry ==
The building of the train ferry began immediately. The right bank railway was extended north to Neuwied in 1869 and on 27 October 1869 to Oberkassel and the train ferry wharf.

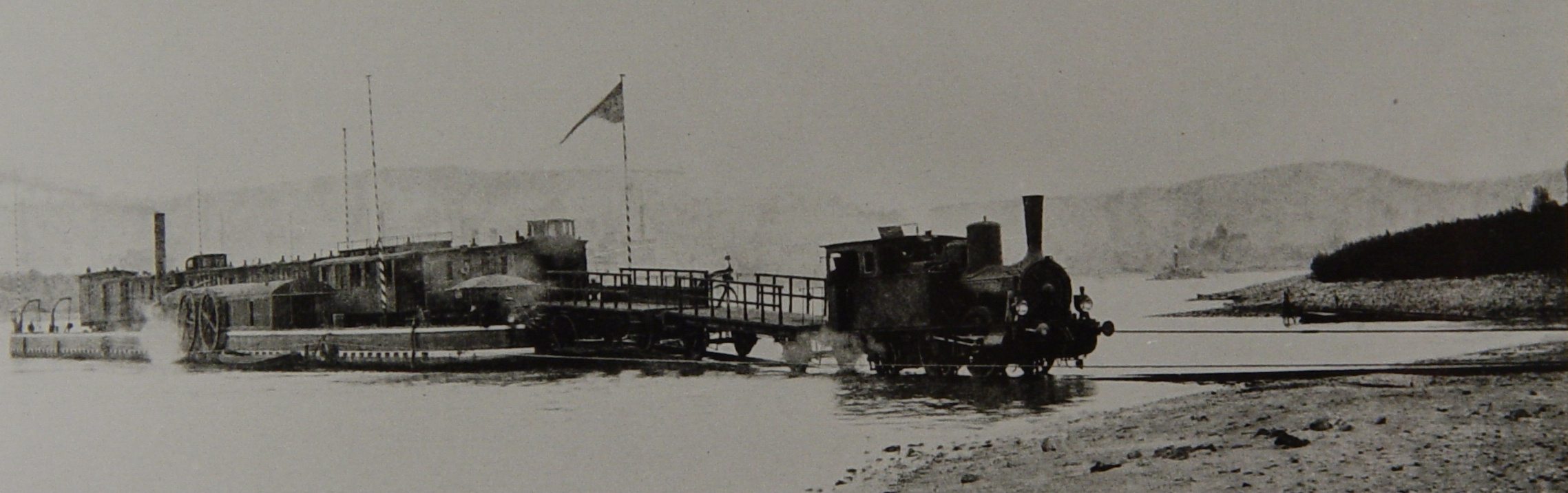
A locomotive pulls a six-car passenger train off ferry in Bonn

The train ferry was similar to the two established train ferries of the Rhenish Railway, between Spyck and Welle (near Emmerich and Kleve) and between Rheinhausen and Hochfeld (in Duisburg), which went into service in 1865 and 1866 respectively. The Bonn–Oberkassel ferries similarly crossed the river using their own engines, guided by two wire cables, although they operated at an angle of 45° against the river toward Oberkassel. The three routes were finished in 1868, 1870 and 1873. The ramps from the riverbank stations to the water were inclined at 1:38. The three ferry pontoons on each side were 70 meters long and 9.5 m wide. Each could carry as many as ten freight wagons, seven passenger carriages or one locomotive.

The train ferry line turned to the left after Oberkassel station to reach the bank. On the Bonn side, the Bonn train ferry station was near the bank and it still served industry there until the Second World War. The line reached the main line near Kessenich and from 1870 had its own track into Bonn Hauptbahnhof. Part of this track still exists, but it is no longer fit for operations; it lies beside the Bad Godesberg-Bonn railway near Bereich Straßburger Weg and Kaiserstraße for a short section before the Hauptbahnhof.

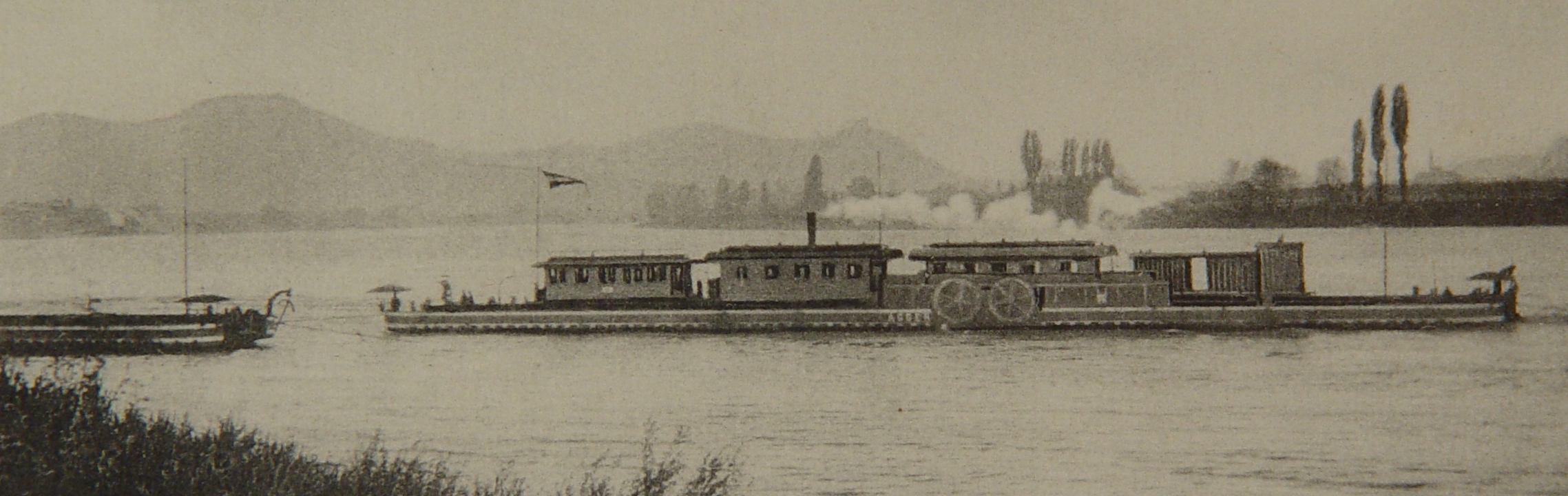
Ferry "Sieg" near the Oberkassel bank, in the background are the Siebengebirge mountains

== Train ferry traffic ==
In the opening year the timetable included, in addition to freight trains, six daily passenger trains from Niederlahnstein to Bonn. The crossing took about 20 minutes, including the push on to the ferry, uncoupling, crossing, coupling and the pull from the ferry.

Traffic levels carried on the ferry for selected years are set out below:

1871: 45,280 wagons and 132 locomotives

1873: 93,107 wagons and 274 locomotives

1879: 47,841 wagons and 39 locomotives

== End of the train ferry ==
Train ferry operations stopped temporarily with the beginning of World War I and permanently from 1 January 1919. The ferry wharves in Bonn were demolished in the same year and the line was lifted between the Bonn riverside and the goods station. A shipyard was built on the Oberkassel bank, which used the former train ferry track to connect to the mainline.
