= Griethausen =

Village and former city in Germany

Coordinates: 51.8219°N 6.1653°E

Griethausen is a village and former city in the municipality of Kleve, Kreis Kleve in the German State of North Rhine-Westphalia.

The village is located at the Griethauser Altrhein. One of the points of interest in the village is the old steelbridge across. It served the railway to Spyck–Welle train ferry.

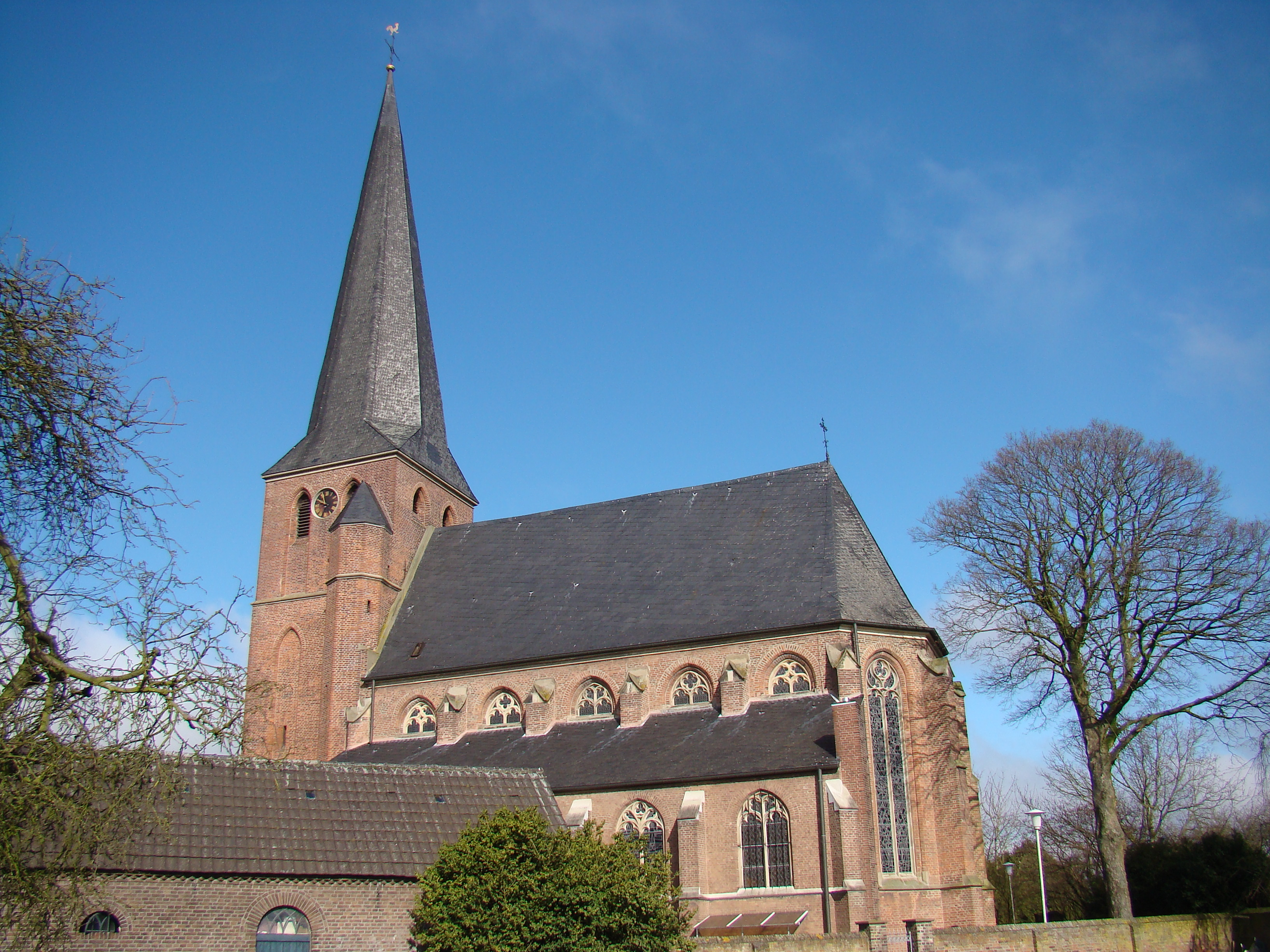
St. Martinschurch

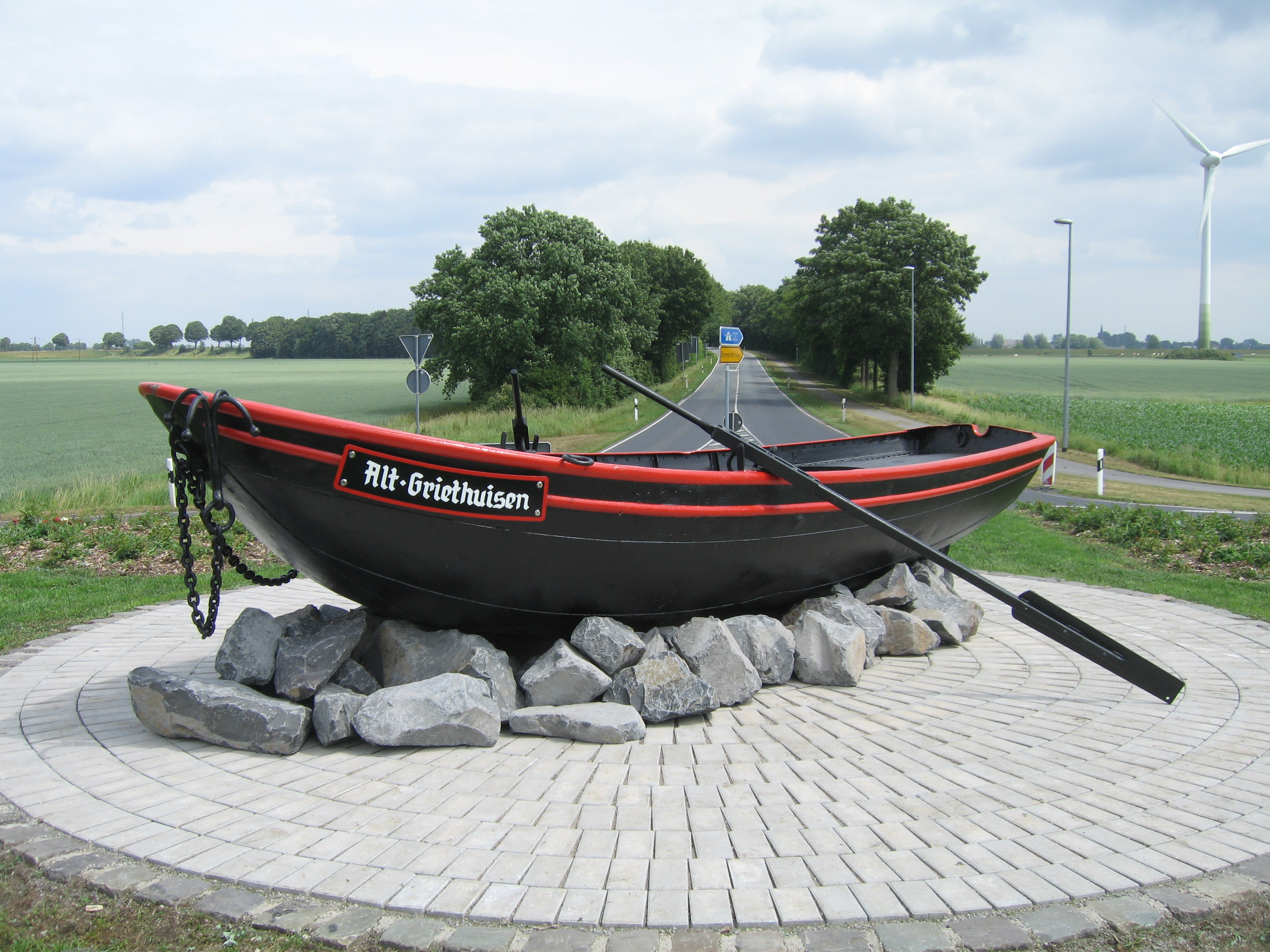
Roundabout decoration

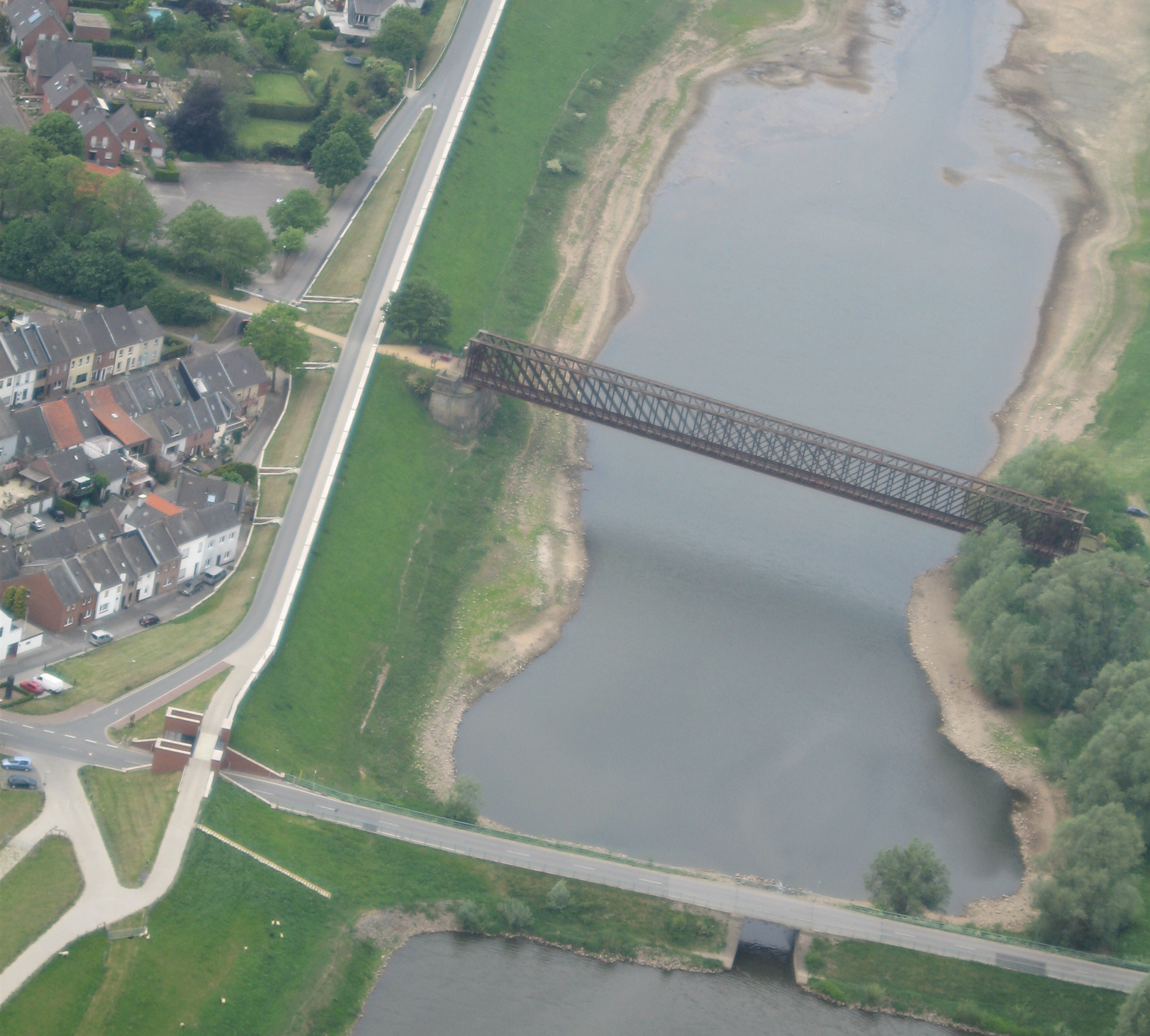
Railway bridge
