= Rhenish Railway Company =

Prussian/German railway company (1835-1886)

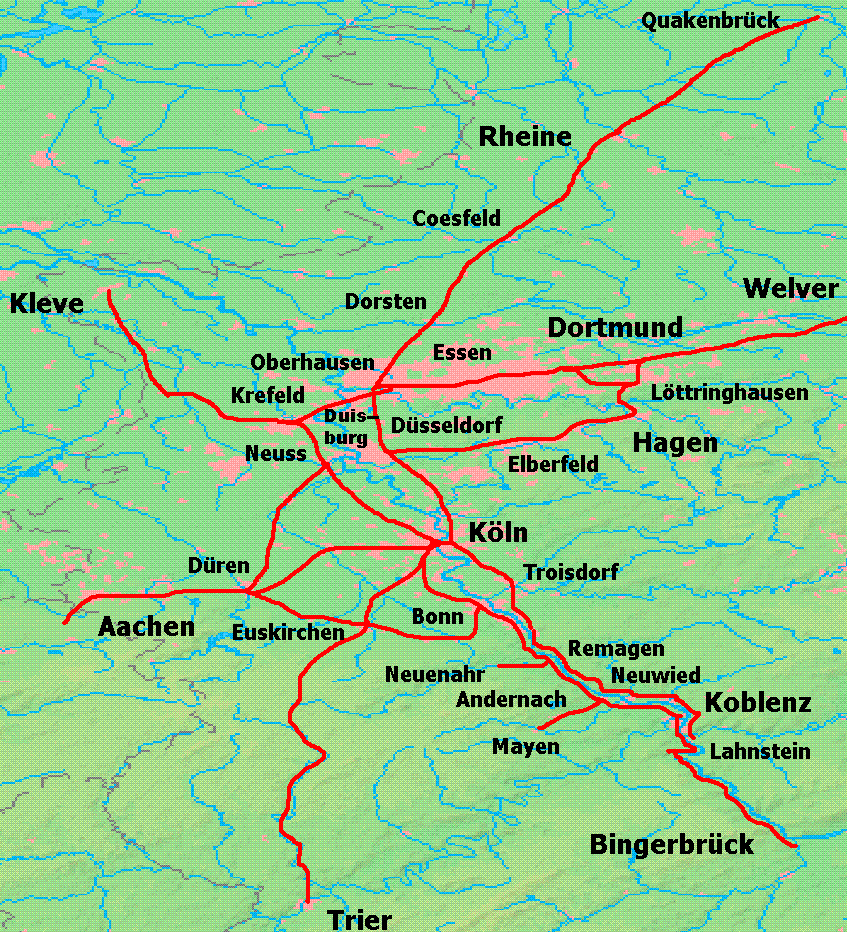
Rhenish Railway Company network shortly before nationalisation

The Rhenish Railway Company (German: Rheinische Eisenbahn-Gesellschaft, RhE) was along with the Cologne-Minden Railway Company (CME) and the Bergisch-Märkische Railway Company (BME) one of the railway companies that in the mid-19th century built the first railways in the Ruhr and large parts of today's North Rhine-Westphalia.

== Foundation ==
The industrialists of the Rhineland and the Bergisches Land, then part of Prussia, sought to avoid paying the high tolls for using the Rhine imposed by the Netherlands and very early in its development, saw the possibility of the new means of transport, the railway. As early as the 1830s committees were established by the cities of the Rhineland to promote proposals for building railways.

Some of the members of the Cologne committee under David Hansemann (1790–1864)—a merchant and banker from Aachen—and the Aachen Committee favoured a railway line through Belgium to the seaport of Antwerp via Liege. Belgium, which had been established as recently as 1830, was interested in trade relations with Prussia, which then included most of the Rhineland. Not having access to the Rhine, Belgium was at a commercial disadvantage to the Netherlands and therefore moved faster than any other country on the continent to build a rail network. The supporters of the line to Antwerp founded the Rhenish Railway Company on 25 July 1835 in Cologne. Its first president was Ludolf Camphausen, who a few years later in 1848 was briefly Prime Minister of Prussia. From 1844 until the company’s nationalisation in 1880, Gustav Mevissen was president of the RhE.

A connection with the German North Sea ports was not achieved until years later. The Cologne-Minden Railway Company was founded in 1843 and in 1847 the line to Minden was finished. Connection with the Royal Hanoverian State Railways provided links to other German seaports. A direct rail connection between the Rhineland-Westphalian industrial belt and the German North Sea ports was established in 1856 with the opening of the Hanoverian Western Railway to Emden and in 1873/74 with the opening of the Hamburg-Venlo railway to Bremen and Hamburg.

== Construction of lines ==
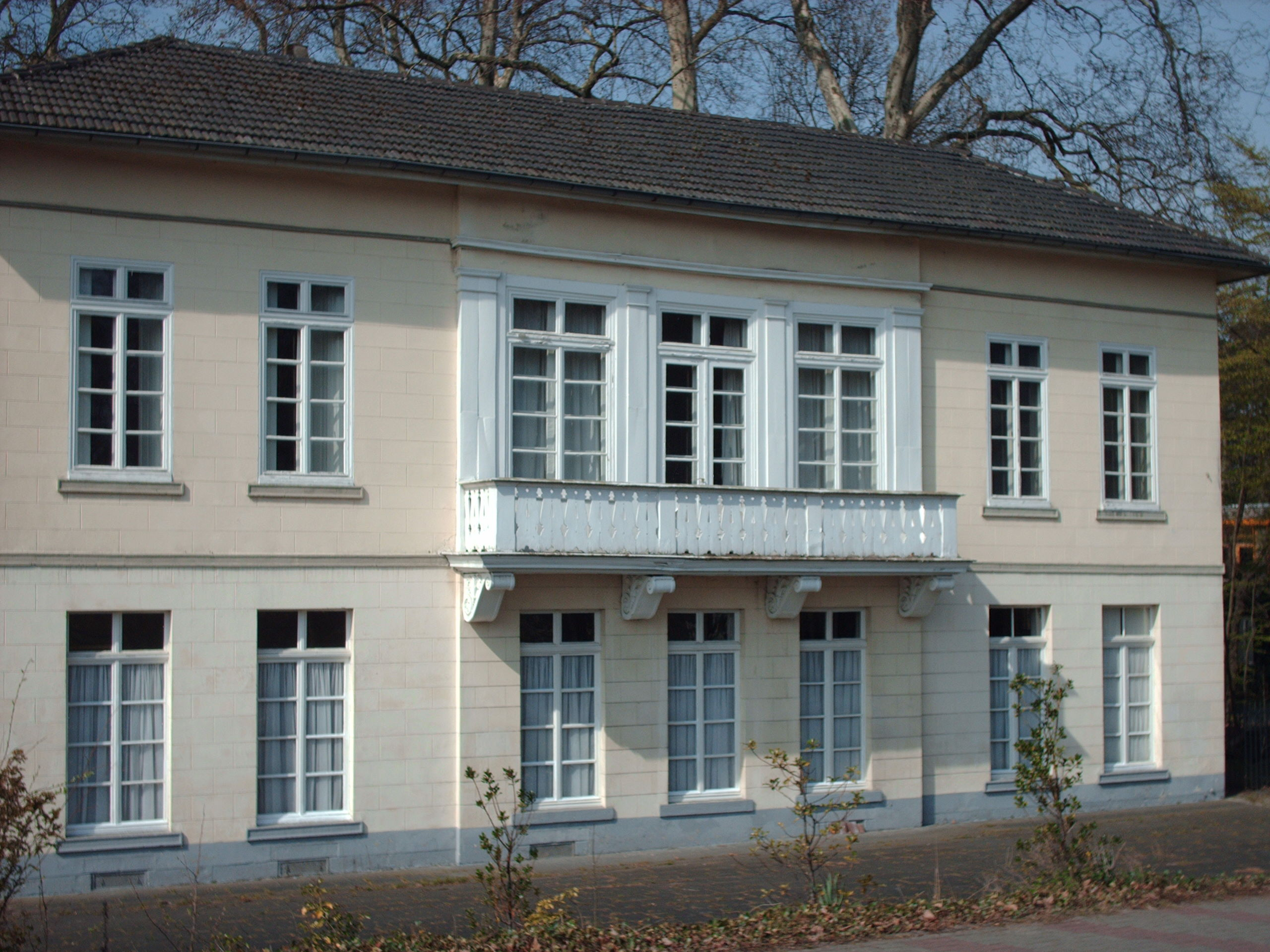
Haus Belvedere, terminus of the line to Müngersdorf

=== Cologne–Aachen–Belgium line ===
On 21 August 1837 the Company received a concession from the Prussian government to build the railway line from Cologne via Düren and Aachen to the Belgian border, a distance of 86 kilometres. The first seven kilometres of track from Cologne to Müngersdorf was opened in 1839. Two further sections to Lövenich and from Düren to Aachen were completed in 1840 and 1841. This included the 1,632 m long Königsdorfer Tunnel, which has now been opened to create a cutting. The last section to the Belgian border at Herbesthal was opened to traffic on 15 October 1843. There was a grade of 1:38 between Aachen and Ronheide (the Ronheide ramp). Until 1855, cable-haulage powered by a stationary steam engine assisted trains up the slope. The line was the first line linking Germany with a non-German country.

The opening of the line created further connections as the already well-developed Belgian network had two connections with northern France, but the routes to Paris was only finished in 1846, on 16 June from Valenciennes, and on 20 June 1846 from Lille.

=== West Rhine line and Cologne Central Station ===
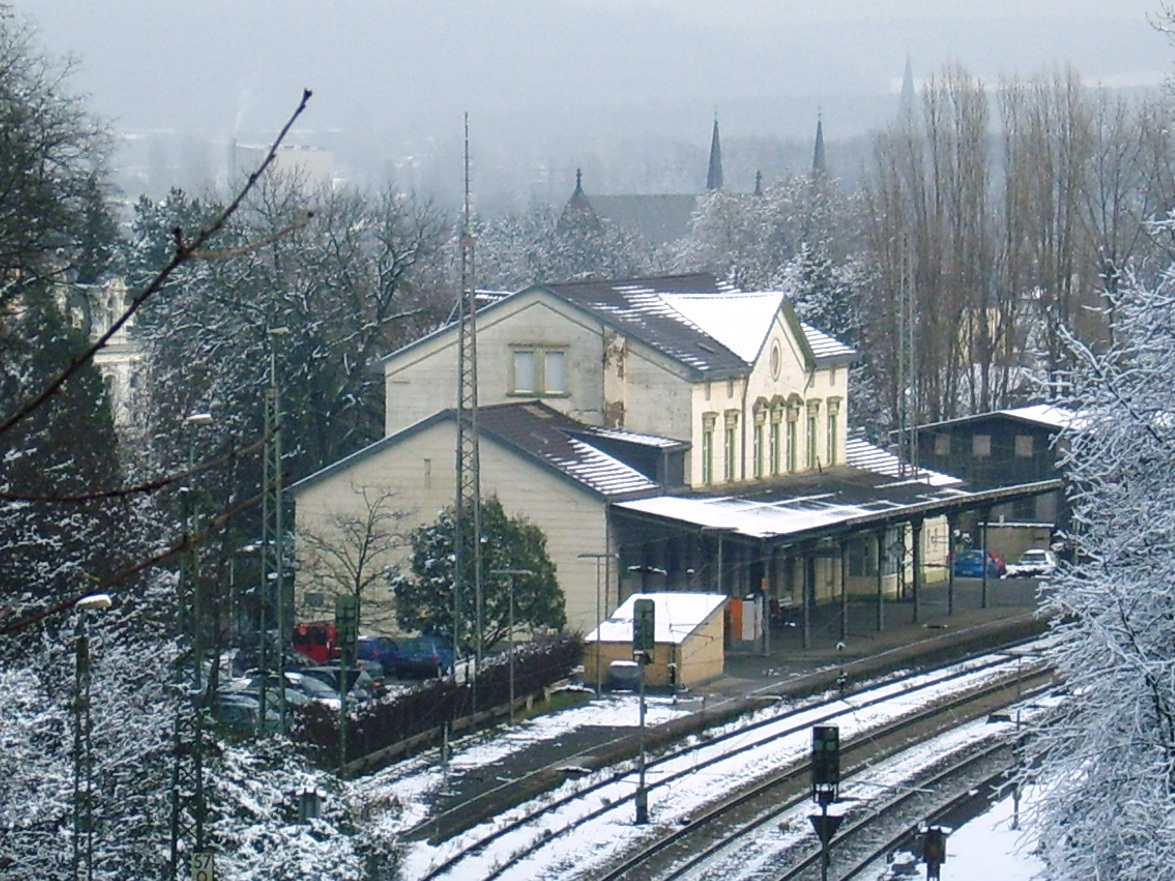
View from the Ichenberg tunnel towards Eschweiler Hbf between Düren and Aachen

On 1 January 1857, the Company acquired the Bonn-Cologne Railway Company (Bonn-Cölner Eisenbahn-Gesellschaft, BCE) for 1.05 million Prussian thalers along with its 45 km long route from Cologne (St. Pantaleon station) to Bonn and Rolandseck, beginning its development of railways along the Rhine. By 1859, it had extended the West Rhine line (or Left Rhine line, Linke Rheinstrecke) 107 kilometres via Koblenz to Bingerbrück, where it connected with the Hessian Ludwig Railway to Mainz and Ludwigshafen as well as the Nahe Valley Railway to Saarbrücken and its coal mines. In addition, in 1864 the Pfaffendorf bridge was built over Rhine at Koblenz and connected with the Nassau State Railways in Oberlahnstein. The Prussian state helped finance the construction of the Pfaffendorf bridge and its connection with the Nassau State Railways.

After the takeover of the BCE, Hermann Otto Pflaume completed plans for a new RhE Central Station in Cologne. The station and the Cathedral Bridge (Dombrücke) were opened in 1859. The Central Station was a combined terminal and through station: it included four terminal tracks for the RhE running to the west, while the CME had two through tracks connecting to its line on the eastern side of the Rhine by the Cathedral Bridge.

=== Cologne–Kleve–Netherlands line ===
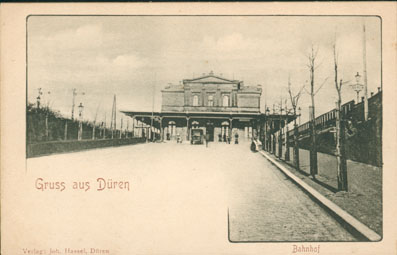
Düren station in 1920

1 June 1860, the Rhenish Railway Company took over the Cologne-Krefeld Railway Company (German, old spelling: Cöln-Crefelder Eisenbahn-Gesellschaft), including its 53 km long line from Cologne to Krefeld. In 1863 this line was extended more than 65 km via Goch to Kleve. From there it built a railway line in 1865 over the Griethausen railway bridge to the Spyck–Welle train ferry over the Rhine, connecting to Elten and Zevenaar in the Netherlands.

This line gave the RhE not only a connection to the Dutch North Sea ports but also part of a lucrative transit route from the Netherlands to Southern Germany and Switzerland. On 9 September 1865 the RhE opened a line from Cleves to Nijmegen, providing another route to Netherlands. In 1878 a new station was opened in Goch as a common station with the intersecting line of the North Brabant-German Railway Company (Dutch: Noord-Brabantsch-Duitsche Spoorweg-Maatschappij) from Boxtel to Wesel.

The RhE’s Kempen–Venlo line, opened in 1868, provided another link to the Netherlands, which ran parallel with the Viersen–Venlo railway of the Bergisch-Märkische Railway Company from Kaldenkirchen.

=== Eifel line ===
In 1864 work began on the construction of the 170 km long Eifel line from Düren via Euskirchen and Gerolstein to Trier, which cost more than 16 million Prussian thalers. The line was completed on 15 July 1871. This gave the RhE a line to the Saar coalfields and convenient connections to the iron ore mines of Lorraine now controlled by Germany as a result of the Franco-Prussian War of 1870-71. After the Austro-Prussian War of 1866, the company sought to supplement its Eifel line and the planned East Rhine Railway by taking over and the Nassau State Railways lines between Wiesbaden, Oberlahnstein and Wetzlar, now controlled by the Prussian government. However, since it was required to take over the loss-making Nahe Valley Railway in return it lost interest. A takeover of Nahe Valley Railway would have limited the profitability of the Eifel line. On 1 October 1875 a more direct route was opened from Kalscheuren on the West Rhine line to Euskirchen.

=== Ruhr line ===
The company, which had previously operated only on the western side of the Rhine, opened a route across the Rhine on 1 September 1866 to connect with its Ruhr line from Osterath via Uerdingen, Rheinhausen, the Rheinhausen–Hochfeld train ferry across the Rhine, Duisburg-Hochfeld, Mülheim-Speldorf, Mülheim (RhE), Mülheim-Heißen to Essen Nord (RhE).

It built sidings to the many coal mines in this region, generally free of charge. In 1874 the line was continued to Bochum Nord, Langendreer Nord to Dortmund Süd. In the same year, the train ferry was replaced by a solid bridge across the Rhine (Duisburg-Hochfeld rail bridge), with the ferry wharf on the right bank replaced by facilities for loading coal on barges. On 15 February 1870 a three-kilometre branch line was opened from Hochfeld train ferry station to (old) Duisburg, which was the starting point of a line to Quakenbrück completed on 1 July 1879.

Some sections of the Rhenish Ruhr line are now closed and where trains runs it is mostly used by freight trains, the only passenger trains on the route are the line S4 S-Bahn trains through southern Dortmund. The section of line between Duisburg-Neudorf and Essen Nord is now closed and has been converted into a cycling and hiking trail.

=== East Rhine line ===
The Rhenish Railway Company opened the East Rhine line (or Right Rhine line, Rechte Rheinstrecke) on 27 October 1869 from Ehrenbreitstein near Koblenz to Neuwied. On 11 July 1870 the section of line was opened from Neuwied to Oberkassel, where the Bonn–Oberkassel train ferry provided a connection between the West Rhine and East Rhine lines. The section from Oberkassel to Troisdorf opened in 1871. The continuation of the line from Troisdorf to Mülheim-Speldorf was completed on 18 November 1874, opening a cheap route for the shipping coal from the Ruhr to the south.

The Ruhr route ran largely parallel to the Bergisch-Märkische Railway Company’s existing Duisburg–Dortmund line and was quickly connected with many mines. The coal shipments grew enormously from the start, as the new railway launched its "one pfennig" tariff to compete for the coal business. As a result of coal prices in Germany and neighboring countries fell by 10% to 15%.

=== Bergisch Land line ===
In 1873 the company continued its policy of aggressive competition in its decision to build a 75 km long railway line through the Bergisches Land from Düsseldorf to Dortmund Süd via Elberfeld, Schwelm Nord, Gevelsberg, Hagen, Herdecke and Hörde, which was completed on 19 September 1879. This line also competed with a BME line.

The line is currently used from Düsseldorf to Mettmann by line S28 S-Bahn trains and by freight trains from Dornap-Hahnenfurth. Most of the section east of Dornap-Hahnenfurth is closed, although the section from Gevelsberg West to Hagen-Heubing is used by line S8 trains and Regionalbahn RB 52 line uses the line from Hagen to Dortmund Signal-Iduna-Park.

=== The North Sea ===
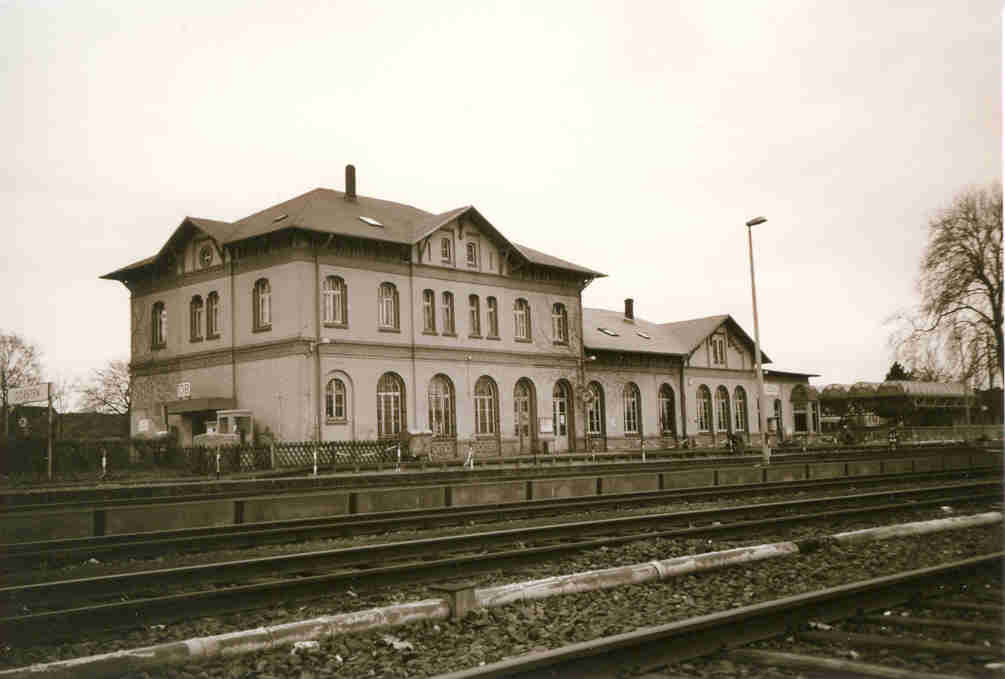
Dorsten station is a typical building of the Rhenish Railway Company

The Rhenish Railway Company still lacked a connection to the German North Sea ports. The Cologne-Minden Railway Company had completed its line on 18 June 1874 from Wanne through Haltern, Münster, Osnabrück and Bremen to Hamburg. The RhE gained a concession for its own route north from the Prussian government on 9 June 1873, which it completed within six years. On 1 July 1879 it opened the 175 km long Duisburg–Quakenbrück line via Oberhausen West, Bottrop Nord, Dorsten and Rheine to Quakenbrück. It connected with the network of the Royal Westphalian Railway Company to Emden in Rheine and of to the Grand Duchy of Oldenburg State Railways to Wilhelmshaven in Quakenbrück.

=== Operational lines ===
The Rhenish Railway Company’s lines in the Ruhr were not well connected to economic centres due to the relatively late construction, especially since they had been planned primarily for the transport of coal. This explains why most of these lines are no longer in operation. By contrast, its lines in the Rhineland and the Rhine Valley are still vital for rail transport.

== Business development and nationalisation ==
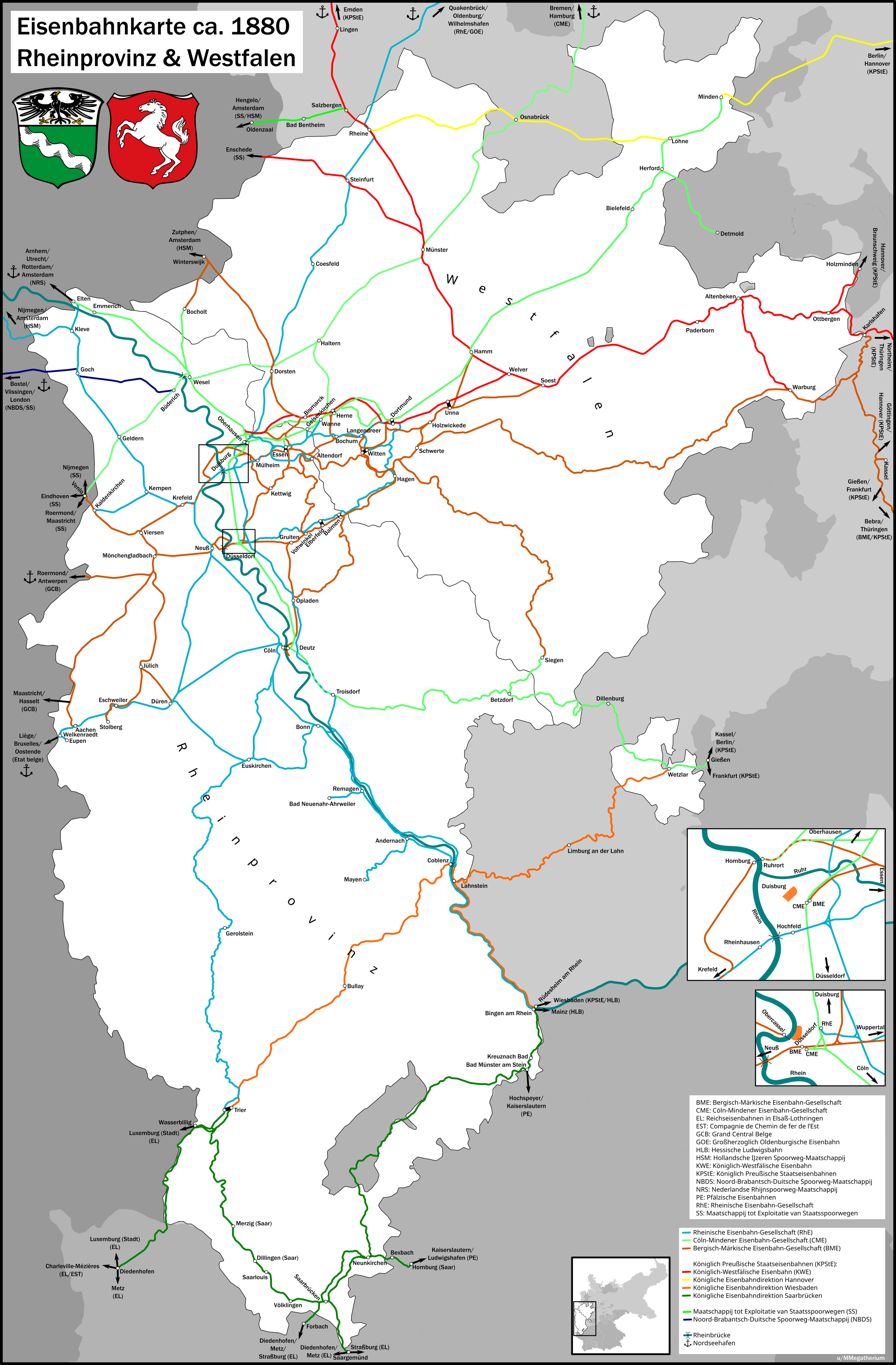
Railway map of the Rhein Province and Westfalen (ca. 1880), shortly before nationalisation

The founder of the Rhenish Railway Company was the leading banker and merchant Ludolf Camphausen. Also involved at an early stage were other bankers such as William Deichmann (of A. Schaaffhausen & Co.) and J. H. Stein & Co., and later Abraham Oppenheim (Sal Oppenheim jr) and J. D. Herstatt. The RhE was at that time the largest private company in Prussia with an initial share capital of three million Prussian thalers.

Originally the banker Abraham Oppenheim, held almost a quarter of the share capital, and another six Cologne bankers held another third. Six months later, Oppenheim together with the Belgian banker Bischoffsheim held a majority of shares.

To meet the high capital requirements of the railway company, the bankers developed new forms of cooperation such as national consortia (underwriters) and later joint-stock banks. Initially some of the Cologne banks which had acquired shares had found it difficult to sell them due to poor economic conditions and attempted to return their shares to the railway company. Finally in 1840 the Belgian government bought the unsaleable shares.

In the course of Bismarck's nationalisation policy the nationalisation of the RhE was announced on 14 February 1880. At that time, the Prussian state held 42% of its share capital. The Prussian state railways created the Royal Directorate of the Rhenish railways at Cologne (German: Königliche Eisenbahn-Direktion zu Köln linksrheinisch) for the management and operation of the network taken over, with effect from 1 January 1880. On 23 February 1881 this was renamed the Royal directorate of left Rhine railways at Cologne (Königliche Eisenbahn-Direktion zu Köln linksrheinisch). The east bank were combined with those of the Cologne-Minden Railway Company which had also nationalised with effect from 1 April 1881 in the newly established Royal directorate of right Rhine railways at Cologne (Königliche Eisenbahn-Direktion zu Köln rechtsrheinisch).

At its nationalisation the Rhenish Railway Company had 507 locomotives, 862 carriages and 13,572 freight wagons. It operated a rail network of 1,356 km length. The purchase price was financed by government bonds worth 591,129,900 marks. The company was formally dissolved on 1 January 1886.
