= Spyck–Welle train ferry =

Coordinates: 51°50′15″N 6°10′18″E

Spyck-Welle train ferry

Overview
- Line number: 2516 (Kleve–Spyck); 2266 (Welle–Elten)
- Locale: North Rhine-Westphalia, Germany

Technical
- Line length: 18.8 km (11.7 mi)

The Spyck–Welle train ferry was a train ferry on the Rhine between Spyck on the left (southern) bank and Welle on the right bank in the lower Rhine region of the German state of North Rhine-Westphalia. It was established in 1865 by the Rhenish Railway Company on the Lower Left Rhine line from Cologne to Neuss, Krefeld, Cleves, Elten, Zevenaar and the Dutch North Sea ports.

== Railways ==
On 5 July 1862 the (German: Rheinische Eisenbahn-Gesellschaft, RhE) and the Dutch Rhine Railway Company (Dutch: Nederlandsche Rhijnspoorweg-Maatschappij, NRS) signed an agreement in Cologne to connect the two railways within Germany. Although preliminary talks in Berlin on a route near the border had indicated that an agreement could be reached, the Prussian military was opposed to a fixed bridge over the Rhine and only agreed to a ferry.

In 1865, the RhE extended its line from Kleve to Griethausen, where it built a 100-meter-long truss bridge (the Griethausen railway bridge) over an old course of the Rhine, which still stands today. This was followed by a 314 m-long approach structure with 20 spans. The line then ran across the Rhine island of Salmorth to the Rhine in Spyck where a marshalling yard with four tracks was built for the breaking up and assembling of trains for the train ferry operation. The crossing to the right bank of Welle is one of the narrowest points of the lower Rhine where currents make it possible for a ferry to cross. A similar marshalling yard was built on the line to Elten, which crossed the small Wild river with a 130 m-long bridge with seven spans. It then connected with the Emmerich–Zevenaar line to run to the Dutch border. NRS had already completed its 5.10 km-long section of the line from there to Zevenaar on 9 March 1864.

The line from Cleves to the border, including bridges, was authorised for operation on 2 April 1864. The construction of the ferries under their original plans, however, had many problems, so that the opening of the entire route was delayed.

== The train ferry ==
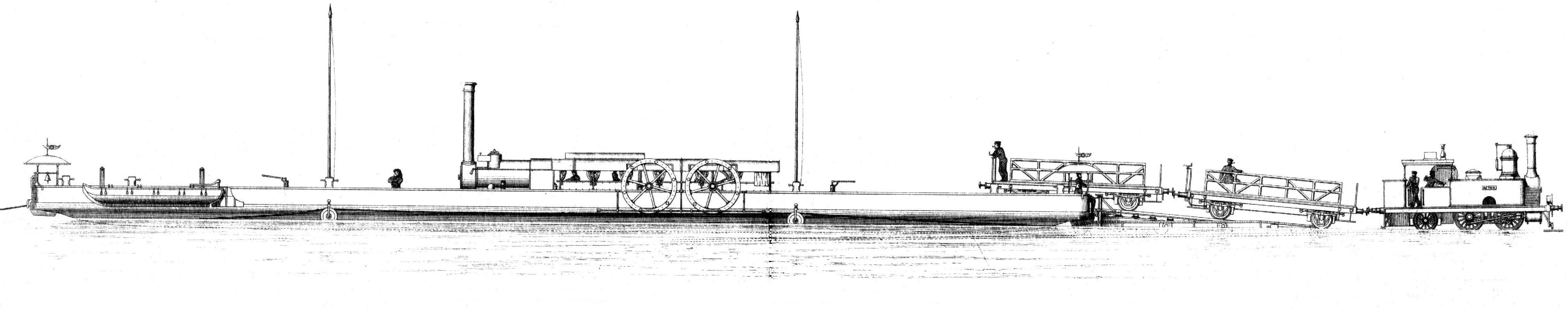
Class B1 Locomotive AETNA of the RhE with two carriages between the pier and the ferry. In the middle of the ferry are the wheels for running on the cable and the boiler

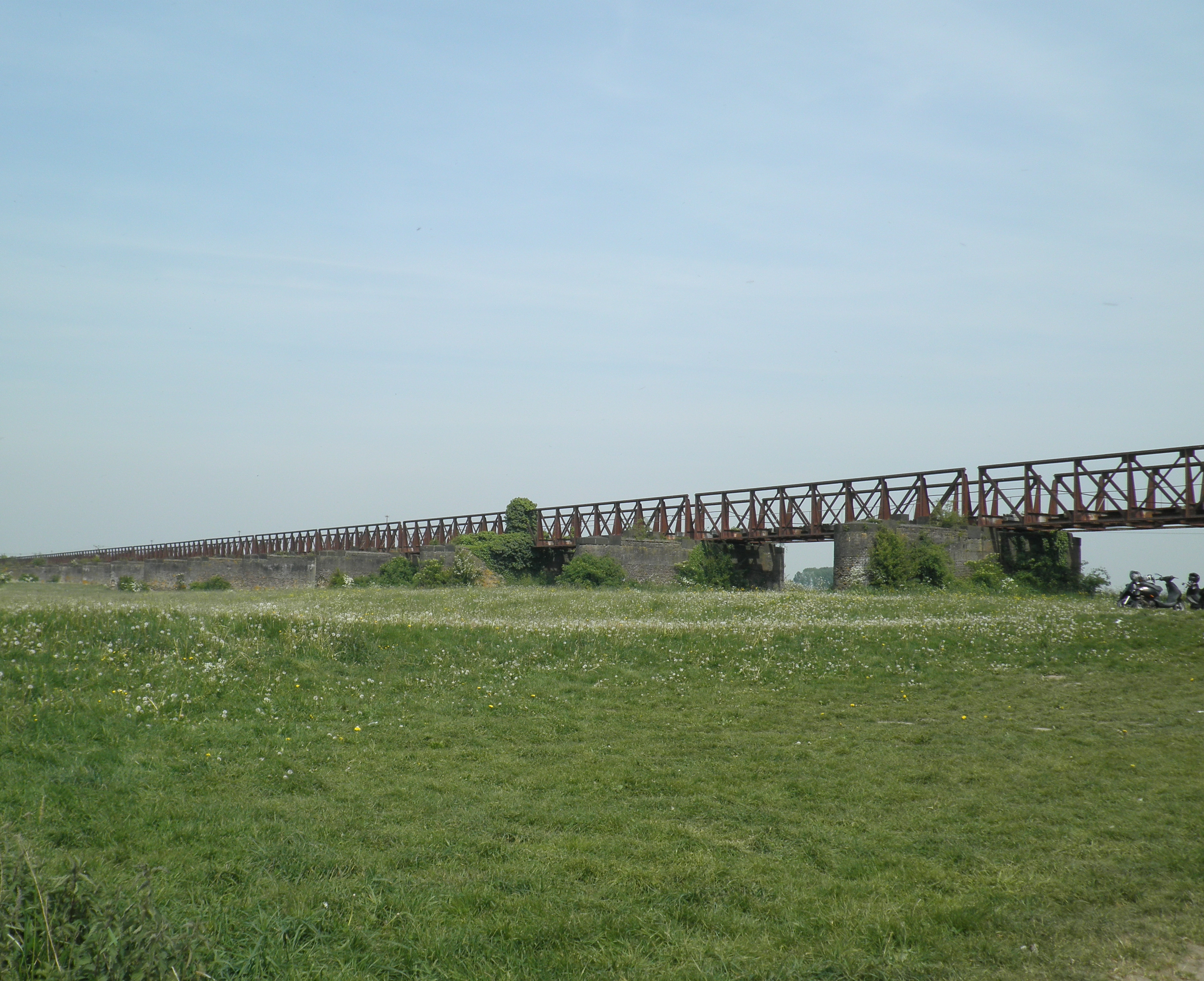
Railway bridge over the Old Rhine, Griethausen

The ferry pontoons for carrying rail wagons were not able to navigate freely on the river, but instead were attached to two cables that were stretched across the river upstream of the ferry. Successful operation of the train ferry was only achieved when the original chains were replaced with stronger cables. The ferry was attached by a cable to another cable that ran over the river to resist the current and to serve as a guide rope. A thinner cable ran through the water on to two wheels on the ferry that were powered by a steam engine; the ferry hauled itself across the river by pulling on the cable.

The wagons were pushed by a locomotive down a ramp with slope of one in 48 to the pontoons and were pulled up on the other side by another locomotive. The pontoons would carry either six freight wagons or five carriages. Passengers stayed in their carriages during the trip.

Two ferry paths were cleared for operations across the Rhine on 19 April 1865 and two days later on 21 April the first passenger train from Cologne crossed the ferry to Zevenaar. According to the timetable, the ferry crossing was scheduled to take 20 minutes. Four minutes were required for the movement of carriages on the ramps at each end and eight minutes for the actual crossing.

A disadvantage for the operation of the train ferry was that it was affected by floods, storms and icy conditions during the winter. This meant that for three weeks a year on average operations were disrupted. Nevertheless, annually 20,000-30,000 carriages and wagons crossed the Rhine. The RhE later built two other train ferries. On 23 August 1866, it opened the Rheinhausen–Hochfeld train ferry and on 11 July 1870, the Bonn–Oberkassel train ferry.

== Closure of train ferry operations ==
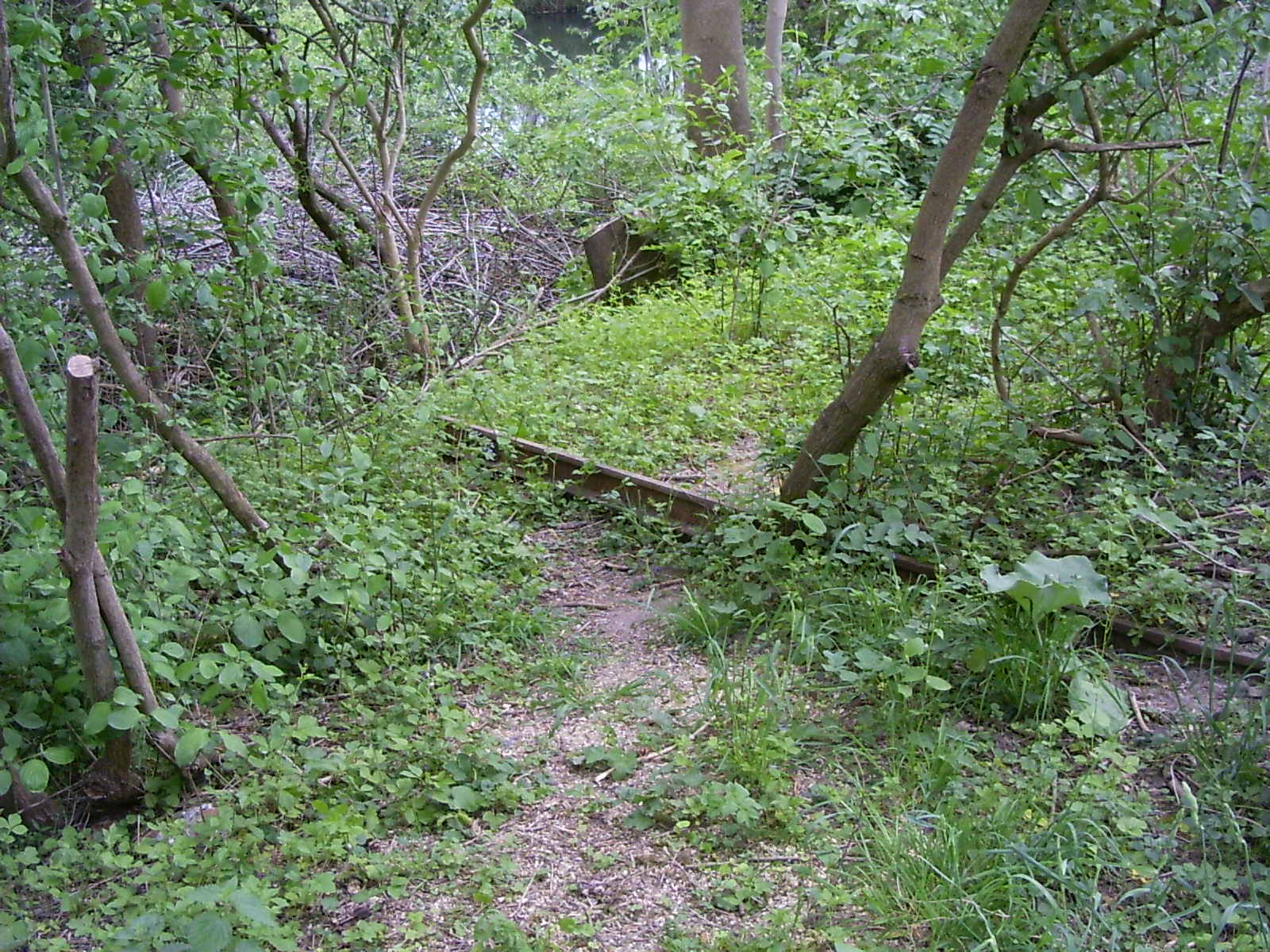
Remains of the line between Elten and Griethausen

Until the nationalisation of the RhE company in 1880, the ferry carried all freight and passengers from the Lower Left Rhine Railway to northern Holland. Then at the end of 1912 the train ferry service was closed and the ramps on both sides were dismantled. Passengers were instead transferred by steamboat. During World War I the line was reduced to two pairs of trains per day. After the war, the Dutch railways (later formally amalgamated as Nederlandse Spoorwegen, NS) and the German State Railways signed an agreement in relation to the operation of rail and ferry services up to 31 August 1926. Around 1930 the tracks between Welle and Elten on the right (northern) bank were dismantled. In contrast, on the left bank passenger services continued until 1960 and freight ran directly to a vegetable oil mill on the Rhine in Spyck until 1987. At that time, the line from Kleve was closed.
