= Rheinhausen–Hochfeld train ferry =

The Rheinhausen–Hochfeld train ferry was a German train ferry on the Rhine between Rheinhausen and Hochfeld, now districts of Duisburg. It was built by the Rhenish Railway Company and commenced operations on 23 August 1866.

== History ==
Following the development of railways on the left bank (the part of the 19th century Prussian Rhine Province that was west of the Rhine) from Cologne to Kleve (the West Lower Rhine line), Aachen (the Cologne–Aachen line) and Bingerbrück (the West Rhine railway ) by the Rhenish Railway Company (Rheinische Eisenbahn-Gesellschaft, RhE) investigated, under its President, Gustav von Mevissen, a rail connection to serve the coal mines in the Ruhr district. The very lucrative coal traffic there was then only served by the Cologne-Minden Railway Company (Cöln-Mindener Eisenbahn-Gesellschaft, CME) and the Bergisch-Märkische Railway Company (Bergisch-Märkische Eisenbahn-Gesellschaft, BME).

=== Construction of the train ferry operation ===
Planning began in 1860 on a new railway line from Osterath on the Cologne–Krefeld line over the Rhine to Essen and later on to Dortmund. Prior to the Austro-Prussian War, the Prussian military opposed the building of a fixed bridge across the Rhine for military reasons, except in fortified cities such as Cologne, Mainz, Koblenz and Düsseldorf. Therefore, a ferry was needed between the left bank in the current Duisburg districts of Rheinhausen and Hochfeld. The Prussian government concession for the railway was issued on 9 March 1863 and the concession for the ferry was issued on 16 July 1863. Construction of the railway commenced immediately. Before commencing work on the ferry, the Rhenish Railway waited for the completion of its Spyck–Welle train ferry so that it could use technology being tested there.

The Rhenish Railway Company expected a high volume of traffic and planned to operate five ferries. It would have five ramps for ferry pontoons with passenger carriages and freight wagons crossing independently between two wire ropes over the Rhine. In fact, however, only four ferries were placed in service. The tracks were laid on ramps with a slope of 1 in 48 down to the marshalling yards on both banks of the river. The major basins were dredged to keep the moorings clear.

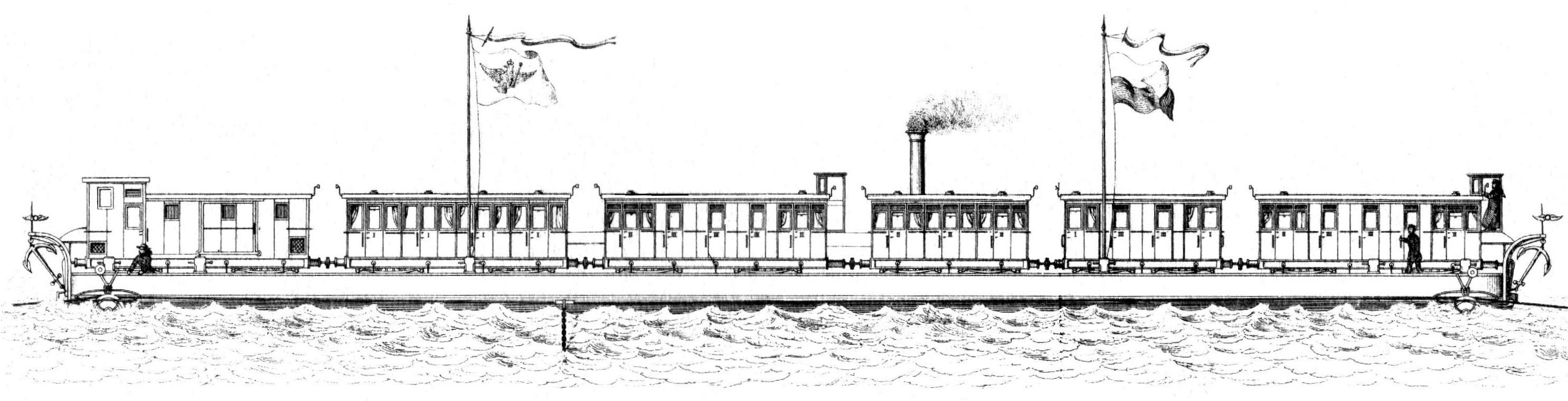
Pontoon loaded with carriages on a trip across the Rhine

Five pontoons for the transport of wagons were ordered from Cologne Maschinenbau AG (a subsidiary of the Berlin-Anhalt Railway Company) in Cologne-Bayenthal. The 47 metre-long pontoons, Ruhr, Lahn and Mosel could carry eight freight wagons cars or five carriages. The fourth pontoon, the 63 metre-long Rhein carried ten freight wagons or seven carriages. The fifth pontoon, Eisponte carried five wagons. A 30 horsepower steam engine was installed at each end of the ferry route, which hauled a cable across the Rhine, connected via a 2.5 metre-long pulley to each pontoon. The wagons ran over a mobile pier on to the pontoon or off it on the other shore. The pontoons ran on a 65 mm-thick rope guide cable over the river. A second cable was used to tow; it was hauled by the pontoon steam engine by means of two pulleys.

The Rhenish Railway Company opened a ferry for freight wagons on 23 August 1866 and a ferry for passenger carriages on 1 September 1866. The third and fourth ferry were completed in 1867. Train ferry services were halted for about four weeks by storms, floods and icy conditions each year. Nevertheless, traffic on the train ferry increased from 104,000 wagons and 51 locomotives in 1867 to almost 350,000 wagons and 286 locomotives in the last year of operation in 1873. Coal traffic carried over the Rhine increased from 8 million hundredweight in 1867 to over 28 million hundredweight in 1873.

The main problem was the great wear of the ropes, which had to be replaced often. The landing sites sanded up quite quickly and had to be dredged regularly.

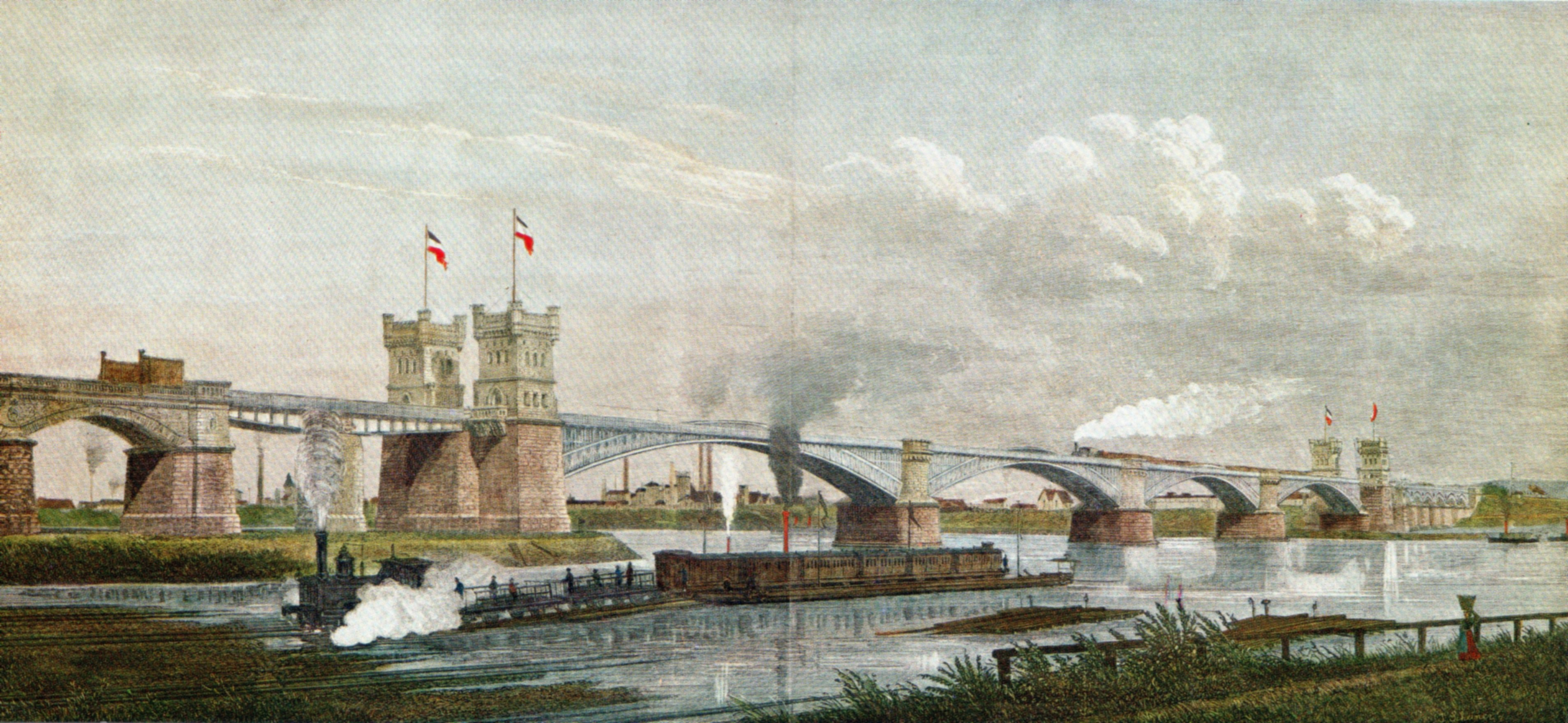
Train ferry with carriages is in the foreground. Behind is the new railway bridge with a freight train in early January 1874. Behind the bridge are factories in Hochfeld

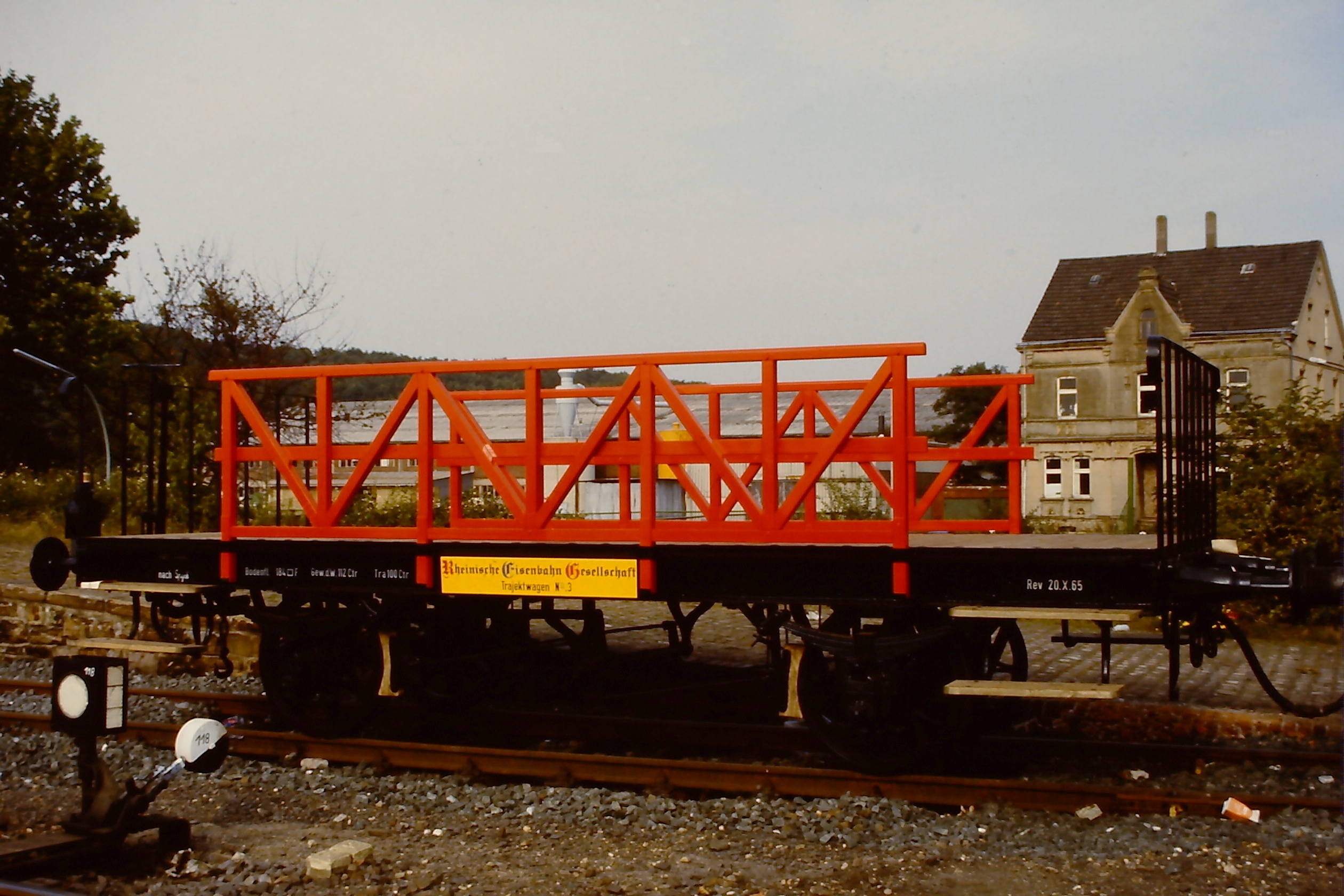
Trajektwagen # 3

=== End of the train ferry operations ===
The Rhenish Railway Company continually sought to build a bridge over the Rhine and finally succeeded. The construction of the Duisburg-Hochfeld rail bridge was approved on 29 July 1871 and construction started immediately. On 24 December 1873, freight wagons began to run over the bridge, passenger carriages were still carried by the train ferry up to 14 January 1874.
