= Deutz–Gießen railway =

Railway line in Germany

Network of the Cologne-Minden Railway Company
Green	Deutz-Gießen Railway	1859–62

The Deutz–Gießen railway is a line between Deutz and Gießen that was built from the late 1850s to connect the Ruhr and the Rhine-Main area, now parts of the German states of North Rhine-Westphalia and Hesse. The line still exists, but little traffic still runs over the whole of the historical route. It now forms the northern part of the Sieg Railway between Cologne Deutz station and Betzdorf, the Heller Valley Railway between Betzdorf and Haiger and the southern part of the Dill Railway between Haiger and Gießen.

== Interests ==
Prussia was interested in building a railway to connect the coal mines in the Ruhr, the steel mills in the Rhineland and the iron ore deposits in the Sieg, Heller, Dill and Lahn valleys. Furthermore, Prussia wanted a better link between the town of Wetzlar and its environs, which was a Prussian exclave, and the Prussian Rhine Province. Problems arose because the proposed line would run through the then independent Duchy of Nassau in the area that is now Lahn-Dill-Kreis. The Duchy made it a condition for a concession to build the line on its territory that Prussia build a link with the Nassau State Railway’s Rhine Railway from Niederlahnstein to connect to the West Rhine Railway (German: Linke Rheinstrecke), which had been completed from Cologne to Koblenz in 1859. Prussia eventually agreed to the link between Niederlahnstein and Koblenz, including the Pfaffendorf Bridge over the Rhine. In 1860 Nassau awarded a concession for the construction of the Sieg Railway through its territory. In Gießen, the Deutz-Gießen Railway would connect with the Main-Weser Railway.

== Construction ==
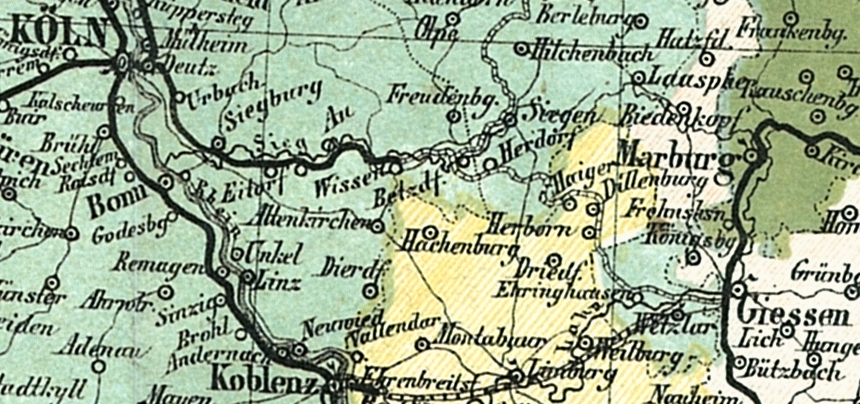
Sieg line from the German rail map of 1861

The Cologne-Minden Railway Company (Cöln-Mindener Eisenbahn-Gesellschaft, CME) obtained a concession to build the line from Deutz to Gießen. Construction started at a branch from the CME’s existing Deutz–Minden mainline at Deutz, which was subsequently connected to Cologne by a bridge over the Rhine, completed in November 1859. At the same time, marshalling and shunting facilities were established nearby at Deutzerfeld, creating a direct link towards the Ruhr. The Deutz-Gießen line is affected by difficult topography. Between Siegburg and Betzdorf the line runs in the valley of the Sieg, running around tight loops, over many bridges and through many tunnels. East of Betzdorf to Dillenburg it had to cross a low mountain range (Mittelgebirge), requiring, among other things, a horseshoe curve to be built. The construction of the line cost 26.5 million thalers. This meant that the cost of construction was 1,088,226 thalers per Prussian mile (7,532.5 metres). On the Cologne-Minden main line, costs were only 782,611 thalers per Prussian mile.

On 1 January 1859 the first section to Hennef was opened. The whole 183 km long line from Cologne to Gießen was completed on 12 January 1862. A branch line was built at the same time from Betzdorf to Siegen. The Betzdorf–Siegen line opened on 10 January 1861, following the arrival of the first locomotive from Betzdorf to Siegen on 28 December 1860.

== Expansion ==
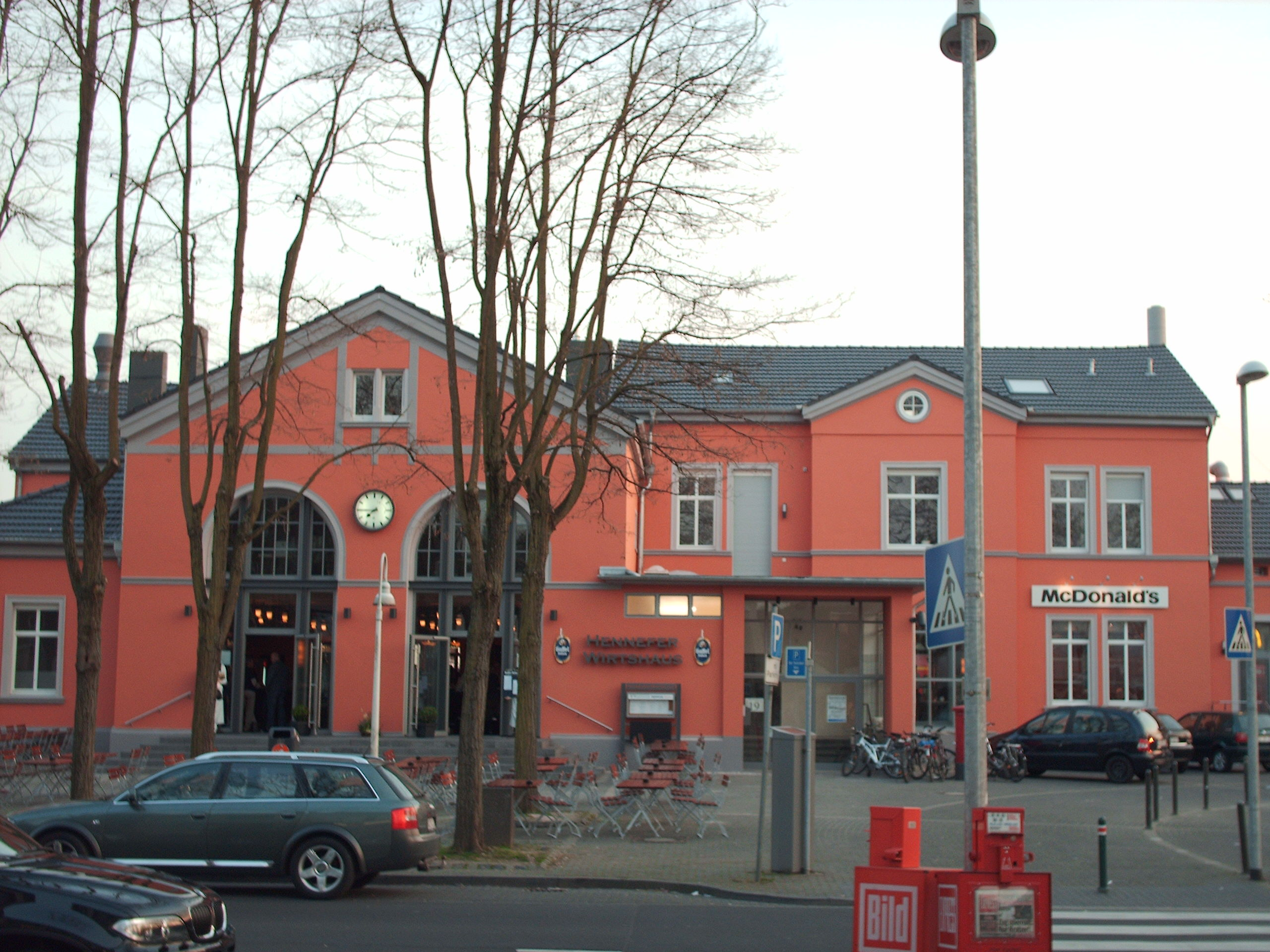
Hennef station building

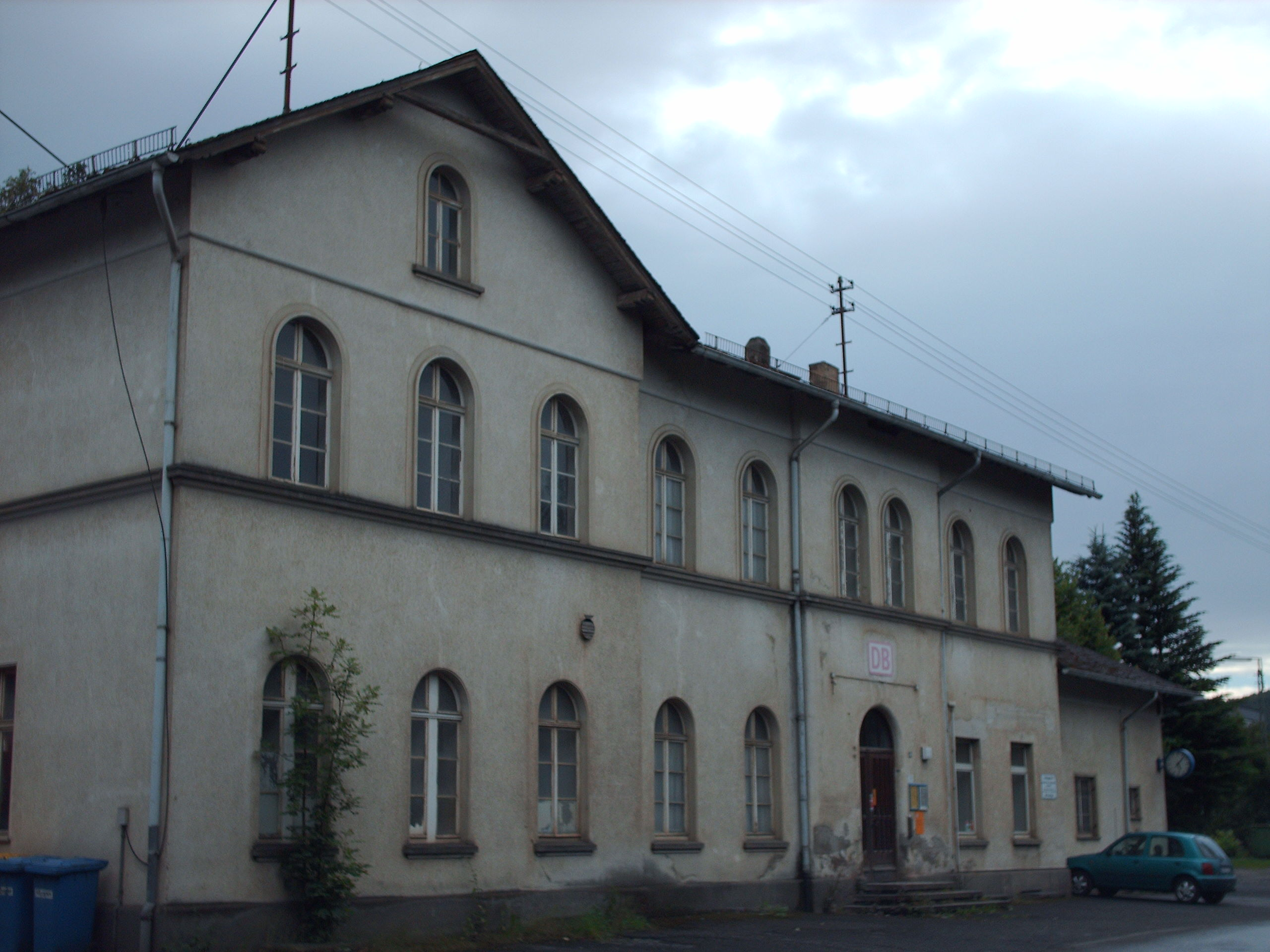
Neunkirchen station building

The line was fully duplicated by 1870. The Sieg flood of 1909 destroyed many bridges, including railway bridges, such as at Herchen.

A major operational problem for the line at the time of its construction was that it was not possible to build a direct link between Siegen and Dillenburg. The Tiefenrother Höhe range (551 m high) lies in between. The construction of long tunnels in 1860 was still immensely complicated and expensive, because dynamite was not yet available. Siegen was connected by the Bergisch-Märkische Railway Company from the Ruhr to the north. Trains continuing south—including coal trains—had to go west to Betzdorf first, then reverse in the station (involving a move of the locomotive from one of the train to the other) and continue east towards Dillenburg.

This problem was corrected in 1915 when the direct connection between Siegen and Haiger was put into operation. The connection between Siegen and Dillenburg was shortened by about 30 km. This was made possible by three major engineering projects: the Niederdielfen viaduct, the Rudersdorf viaduct and especially the Rudersdorf tunnel.

== Consequence ==
The shortening of the route meant that traffic shifted and now usually ran via Siegen and Haiger. The historic line between Betzdorf and Haiger lost its significance as a through route because of its unfavourable topography. The line still exists, but is now only used for regional transport. Since 1980, it has been mostly reduced to single track and in the 1990s it was threatened with closure. An additional consequence of this route shortening is that the former Deutz-Gießen Railway is now operated in three sections. Even today, however, the chainage markers (used for locating points on the line) on the three sections of line are measured from Cologne-Deutz along the old route.
