= Bingerbrück–Rüdesheim train ferry =

The Bingerbrück–Rüdesheim train ferry was operated as a train ferry from 1862 (163 years ago) to 1900 (125 years ago) across the Rhine between Bingerbrück now in the German state of Rhineland-Palatinate and Rüdesheim now in the state of Hesse.

On 15 December 1859 the Rhenish Railway Company (German: Rheinische Eisenbahngesellschaft) put the final section of its Left Rhine railway from Cologne to Bingerbrück into operation. A few months later, on 26 May 1860, the Rhine-Nahe Railway Company (Rhein-Nahe Eisenbahn-Gesellschaft) completed the Nahe Valley Railway from Bingerbrück to Neunkirchen in the Saarland. Both rail lines could be used to supply the demand for coal in the Middle and Upper Rhine. The supply of the Wiesbaden and Frankfurt area by rail was only possible by a roundabout route via the Rhine-Main Railway to Mainz and Darmstadt. In 1862 the Nassau Rhine Railway (Nassauische Rheinbahn, now part of the East Rhine line) was opened between Rudesheim and Oberlahnstein, providing a more direct route to Wiesbaden and Frankfurt.

To encourage the transport of coal by rail and to compete more effectively with river barges, the Rhine-Nahe Railway and the Nassau State Railway (which now owned the Nassau Rhine line) decided to set up a ferry for freight wagons between Bingerbrück and Rüdesheim. The freight ferry was put into operation on 1 September 1862. A passenger ferry opened on 5 November 1861 on the Bingerbrück–Bingen–Rüdesheim route.

Originally it was operated with two paddle steamers (Bingerbrück and Rüdesheim) attached alongside coupled pontoons carrying the freight wagons over the Rhine. The freight wagons were loaded and unloaded via tracks on moveable ramps. Passengers used steam ships and ferries operating on a different route (see above).

The movement of wagons did not end until 1900. The passenger ferry was operated by Prussian State Railways until July 1907. After that passengers were able to use the tram to Bingen and the Bingen–Rüdesheim ferry. Later freight traffic could use the Hindenburg Bridge built from 1913 to 1915, but it was destroyed in 1945 and never rebuilt.
