= Hindenburg Bridge =

Train bridge over the Rhine at Rüdesheim, Germany

Coordinates: 49°58′26″N 7°56′32″E

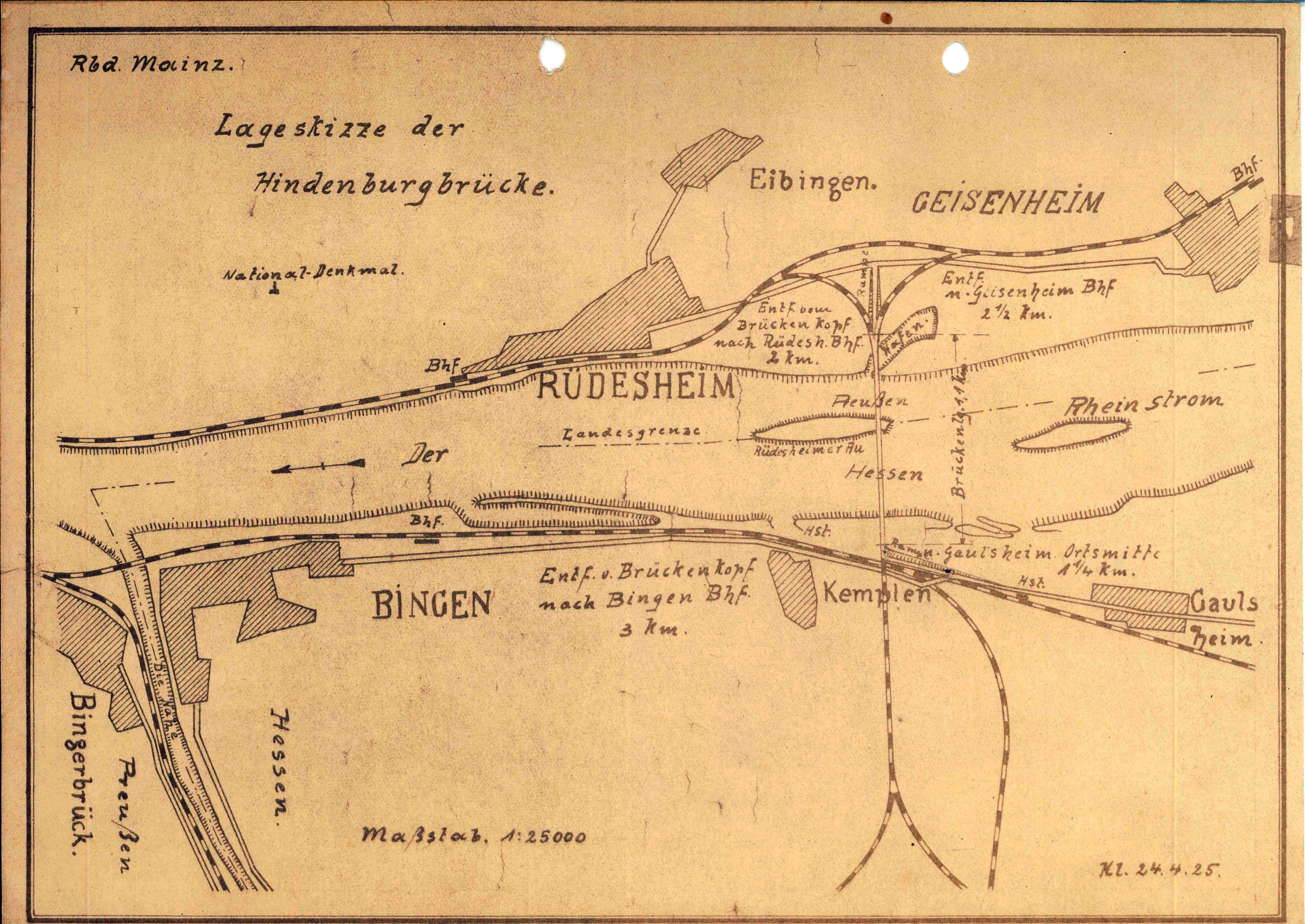
- Sketch of location from 1925

Overview
- Line number: 3514
- Locale: Hesse and Rhineland-Palatinate, Germany
- Termini: Rüdesheim; Bingen (Rhein), formerly Bk Rochusberg

Technical
- Line length: 6.7 km (4.2 mi)

The Hindenburg Bridge (German: Hindenburgbrücke) was a railway bridge over the Rhine between Rüdesheim in the German state of Hesse and Bingen-Kempten state of Rhineland-Palatinate, named in 1918 after Field Marshal Paul von Hindenburg, later German President. The bridge was put in service in 1915, destroyed in the Second World War and never rebuilt.

Since 2002 the remains of the Hindenburg bridge has been the easternmost point of the UNESCO World Heritage Site of the Upper Middle Rhine Valley.

== Bingerbrück–Rüdesheim train ferry ==
The bridge was preceded by the Bingerbrück–Rüdesheim train ferry, opened in November 1861, making the first connection between the Nassau Rhine Railway of the Nassau State Railway (German: Nassauische Staatsbahn) and the Nahe Valley Railway of the Rhine-Nahe Railway Company (Rhein-Nahe-Eisenbahn-Gesellschaft). This created a freight connection between the Rhine-Main and Saar areas and opened a new market for Saar coal. The freight ferry carried wagons until 1900. The passenger ferry was operated by Prussian State Railways until July 1907. After that passengers were able to use the tram to Bingen and the Bingen–Rüdesheim ferry.

== Planning and building ==
In 1900 the Prussian Minister of Public Works in the Prussian House of Representatives spoke in favour of the construction of a bridge over the Rhine at Bingen. Studies by the Prussian State Railways initially favoured a location at Bingerbrück because the current around the Binger Loch (“Bingen hole”, a narrow passage created through a reef in the Rhine in the 17th century and subsequently widened) made a bridge unfeasible in Bingen. Therefore, a site for the bridge was selected upstream of the Rhine island of Rüdesheim Aue at Rhine km mark 525.26, where the river is about 900 metres wide. Debates about whether to construct a railway bridge, a road bridge or a combined bridge continued for over a decade in the Reichstag until funds for the construction of a railway bridge were approved in March 1913. In this case, military concerns were decisive. The new Rhine bridge was a strategic railway connecting the Right Rhine Railway to the Nahe Valley Railway and the Glan Valley Railway, thus creating another German military railway to the French border. The German Empire provided over 75% of the cost of the bridge and access lines, the rest was funded by the participating states of Prussia and the Grand Duchy of Hesse. The connecting curve was from the bridge towards Geisenheim and on to Wiesbaden was not eligible for imperial funding, because military transport would apparently follow the Rhine from Oberlahnstein, using the Lahntal railway. Two similar railway bridges were also built across the Rhine mostly for military reasons: the Crown Prince Wilhelm Bridge at Urmitz and the Ludendorff Bridge at Remagen.

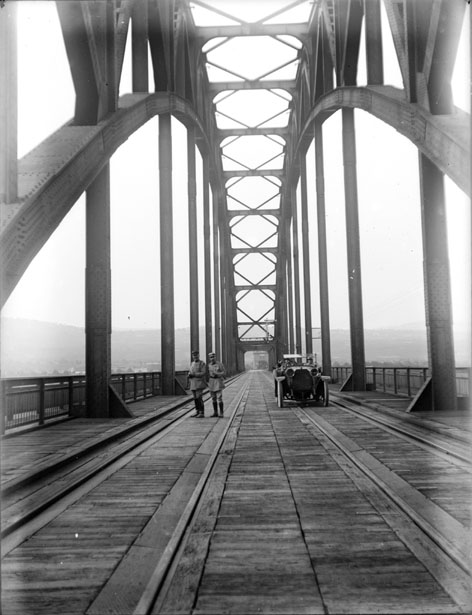
The Hindenburg Bridge

The construction of the Hindenburg Bridge began in June 1913 and it was opened on 16 August 1915. At the start of construction many foreign laborers, mostly Italians, were employed on the work. After a short interruption of construction at the beginning of the First World War work continued with the use of Russian prisoners of war.

The bridge had a total length of 1,175 metres and consisted of two sets of arches each side of the main 741 m long steel bridge. The steel section consisted of two arches and five spans of parallel trusses, with the tracks mounted on the lower trusses. The steel arches were each 169.4 m long and were unusually high. One of the truss spans was 94.2 m long and the other four were 77.0 m long. The double track bridge had a total width of 12 m of which 7 m was used for rail tracks. On both sides there was a footpath.

The bridge together with connecting lines included a total of 11 kilometres of double track main lines. In the north, the bridge connected to two connecting curves to the Right Rhine Railway. On the south (left side) of the Rhine, the line continued south from Büdesheim to Sarmsheim on the Bingerbrück–Bad Kreuznach line. Another curve connected with the Mainz–Bad Kreuznach line in Ockenheim station. In 1944, during the Second World War, another connection curve was built from Ockenheim station to a single-track branch line to the Left Rhine line towards Bingen. This curve was intended to make the line usable even if the bridge was destroyed.

== Operations ==
In the First World War the bridge was used almost exclusively for the supply of German troops on the Western Front. After the war, the left bank of the Rhine and a bridgehead at Wiesbaden was occupied by French troops. The occupation forces seized the bridge and converted it to allow carts and cars to use it. In addition, the bridge was used by military trains and from the end of 1919 by civilian freight trains at night and on a small scale. From October 1920 the bridge was available for use by German civilians, on payment of a high bridge toll (four marks after the hyperinflation culminating in 1923), which led to years of protests from the local business community.

After the withdrawal of the occupation troops, Deutsche Reichsbahn (German State Railways) took over passenger rail services over the bridge again in July 1930. In the summer 1938 timetable eleven weekday passenger services and 15 services on Sundays operated, mainly on the Wiesbaden–Bad Münster am Stein route. During the Second World War, the bridge was used to overcome disruption on the two Rhine lines.

== Destruction ==
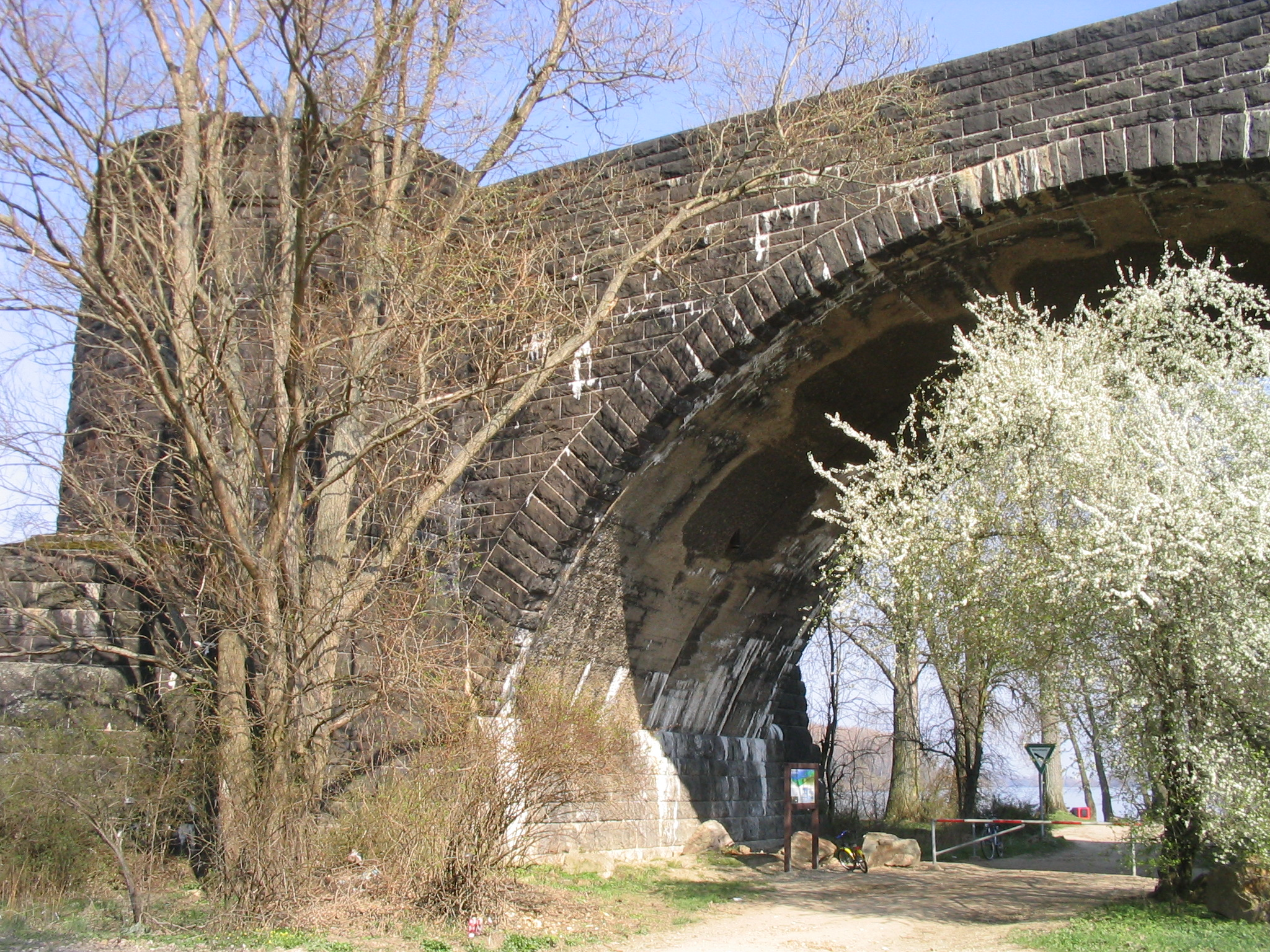
Ruins of the Hindenburg Bridge

From August 1942 the bridge was the target of several air raids. On 13 January 1945, the spans of the bridge were destroyed. The final destruction of the Hindenburg Bridge was carried out on 15 March 1945 by pioneers of the Wehrmacht in order to impede the advance of the United States armed forces.

In the summer of 1945, the wreckage of the bridge was cleared from the main navigation channel of the Rhine and in 1948 the bridge's superstructure on the river banks was demolished. Reconstruction of the bridge was discussed until the 1950s. The priority of Deutsche Bundesbahn (German Federal Railways) was to rebuild the Emperor Bridge in Mainz and from 1954 it had no interest in another bridge over the Rhine. In 1970 the abutments were demolished to improve road safety. From time to time the possibility of rebuilding the bridge is discussed.
