= Nassau State Railway =

The Nassau State Railway (German: Nassauische Staatsbahn) took over the privately built railway lines on the Rhine and Lahn rivers in the Duchy of Nassau from the Nassau Rhine and Lahn Railway Company in 1861 and extended them further. It was taken over by the Prussian State Railways in 1866.

== Establishment ==
After the Taunus Railway (Taunus-Eisenbahn) from Frankfurt reached Wiesbaden in 1840, a private company was founded to continue the line along the Rhine. This was originally called the Wiesbaden Railway Company (Wiesbadener Eisenbahngesellschaft); from 1853 it was called the Nassau Rhine Railway Company (Nassauische Rhein Eisenbahn-Gesellschaft); and after 1855 it was called the Nassau Rhine and Lahn Railway Company (Nassauische Rhein- und Lahn Eisenbahn-Gesellschaft). The company was given a concession on 23 June 1853 by the Duchy of Nassau for the construction of the Nassau Rhine Valley Railway from Wiesbaden to Rüdesheim and Oberlahnstein. On 31 March 1857, this was followed by the concession for the Lahntal railway from Oberlahnstein to Wetzlar.

Only parts of the 188 kilometres of lines covered by the concession were completed due to insufficient funding. Therefore, on 14 October 1858, the Duchy of Nassau withdrew the company's concession and took over operations on the lines. The state formally took over the concession on 2 May 1861 on these lines:

- 30 km of the Rhine Valley Railway from Wiesbaden via Biebrich to Rüdesheim
- 21 km of the Lahntal railway from Oberlahnstein to Nassau.

On 20 November 1861, the company was reconstituted as the Nassau State Railway.

The Nassau State Railway completed the 56.6 km long gap in the Rhine Valley line between Rüdesheim and Oberlahnstein on 22 February 1862. The remaining 78 km of the Lahntal railway to Wetzlar was completed in three sections on 10 January 1863. This work was directed by the railway surveyor and engineer, Moritz Hilf.

== Connections to other lines ==
In Wiesbaden the Nassau state railway connected with the Taunus Railway from Frankfurt to Wiesbaden, opened in 1839 and 1840. At the end of the Lahn Valley line in Wetzlar, it connected with the Deutz-Giessen line completed in 1862 by the Cologne-Minden Railway Company (Cöln-Mindener Eisenbahn).

In order to make a connection in the Rhine Valley with other rail companies, there were two subsequent concessions:

- The Bingerbrück–Rüdesheim train ferry was opened between Rudesheim and Bingen in 1862, connecting the line to the Rhine-Nahe Railway Company’s (Rhein-Nahe-Eisenbahn-Gesellschaft) Nahe Valley Railway. This created a freight connection between the Rhine-Main and Saar areas and opened a new market for Saar coal. The ferry carried freight wagons until 1900.
- A concession was granted to connect Oberlahnstein with the Rhenish Railway Company’s (Rheinischen Eisenbahngesellschaft), requiring bridges over the Lahn and the Rhine. A train ferry connected Oberlahnstein with the Rhenish Railway's West Rhine line (Linke Rheinstrecke) at Königsbach station for two years from the second half of 1862. It primarily served the transport of ore from the Lahn valley and the supply of industry in the Lahn valley with Ruhr coal. The Pfaffendorf Bridge over the Rhine at Pfaffendorf (Koblenz) and the bridge over the Lahn between Niederlahnstein and Oberlahnstein were put into operation on 3 June 1864.

== Takeover by Prussia ==
With the end of the Duchy as an independent state as a result of the Austro-Prussian War, the Nassau State Railway was absorbed by the Prussian State Railways.

An attempt by the Rhenish Railway Company, to take over the Nassau State Railway and to operate the planned extension along the Rhine failed because of the demands of the Prussian state. Since Prussia's budget was strained by the war, it made the sale of the railway conditional on the simultaneous takeover of the loss-making Rhine-Nahe Railway Company. The Rhenish Railway Company was not willing to take over the Rhine-Nahe Railway Company, which would have undermined the profitability of its Eifel line, then under construction.

The Prussian State Railway preserved the organisation of the former Nassau State Railway and it was initially an independent division, based in Wiesbaden. Following the nationalisation of the Prussian private railways, its assets were incorporated in 1880 in the Prussian State Railway's Frankfurt am Main division.
