= Hohenzollern Bridge =

Bridge in Cologne

Hohenzollern Bridge Hohenzollernbrücke
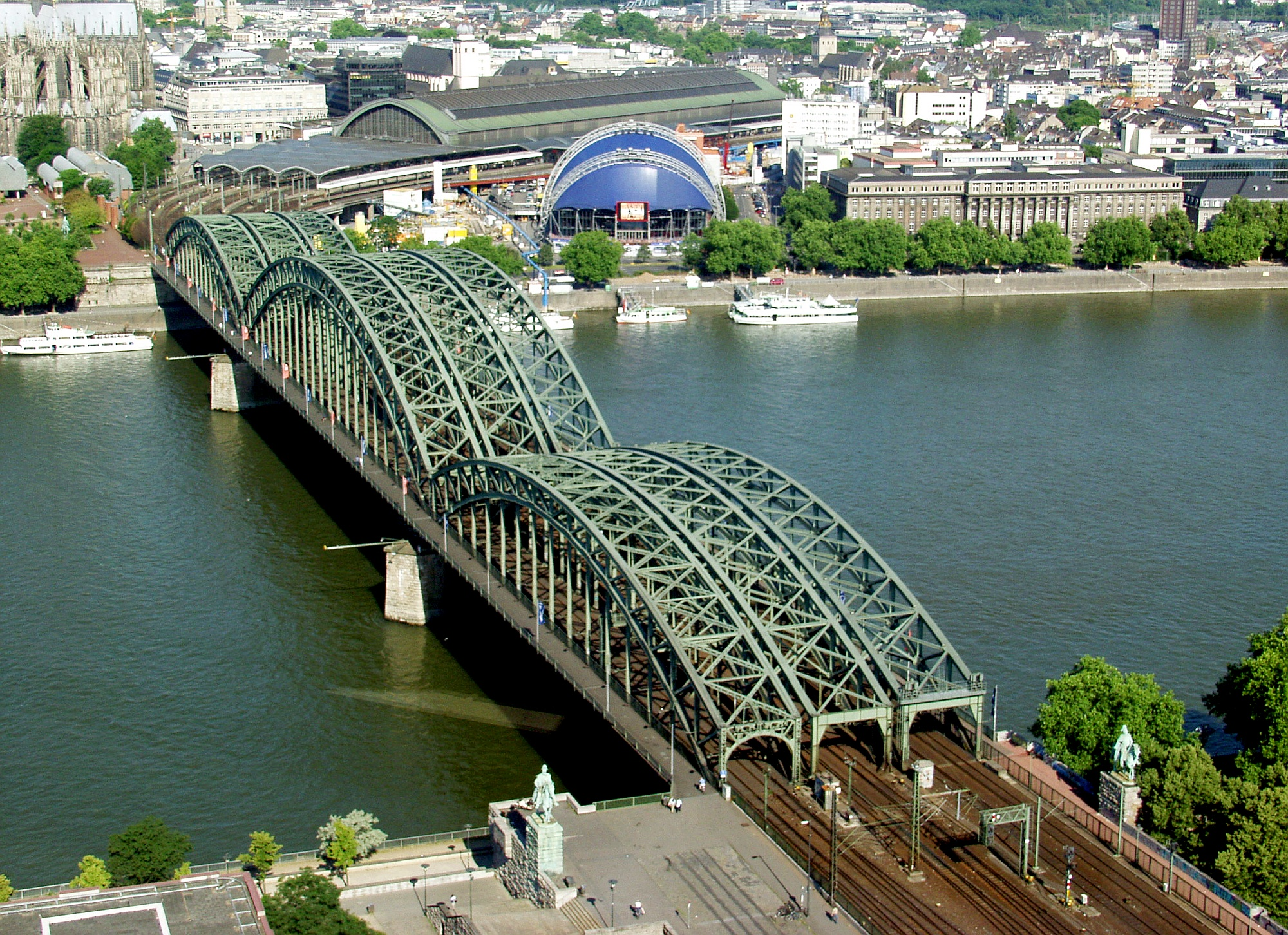
- Hohenzollern bridge
- Coordinates: 50°56′29″N 06°57′56″E
- Carries: Train and pedestrian traffic
- Crosses: River Rhine
- Locale: Cologne, North Rhine-Westphalia, Germany
- Owner: Deutsche Bahn

Characteristics
- Design: Tied arch bridge (1948)
- Material: Concrete piers with steel superstructure
- Total length: 409.19 metres (1,342.5 ft)
- Width: 26.2 metres (86 ft) (deck, 1987)
- Longest span: 167.75 metres (550.4 ft)
- No. of spans: 118.88 metres (390.0 ft) - 167.75 metres (550.4 ft) - 122.56 metres (402.1 ft) (1987)

History
- Constructed by: Krupp Maschinen- und Stahlbau (steel), Grün & Bilfinger and Heinrich Butzer (concrete) 1946; August Klönne and Stahlbau Albert Liesegang (steel), Philipp Holzmann AG (concrete) 1956; Hein, Lehmann & Co. and Krupp Industrietechnik GmbH and Thyssen Engineering GmbH (steel) 1986
- Construction start: 1946, 1956, 1986
- Construction end: 1948, 1959, 1987
- Construction cost: DM 14,000,000

Location
- Interactive map of Hohenzollern Bridge

Hohenzollern Bridge Hohenzollernbrücke
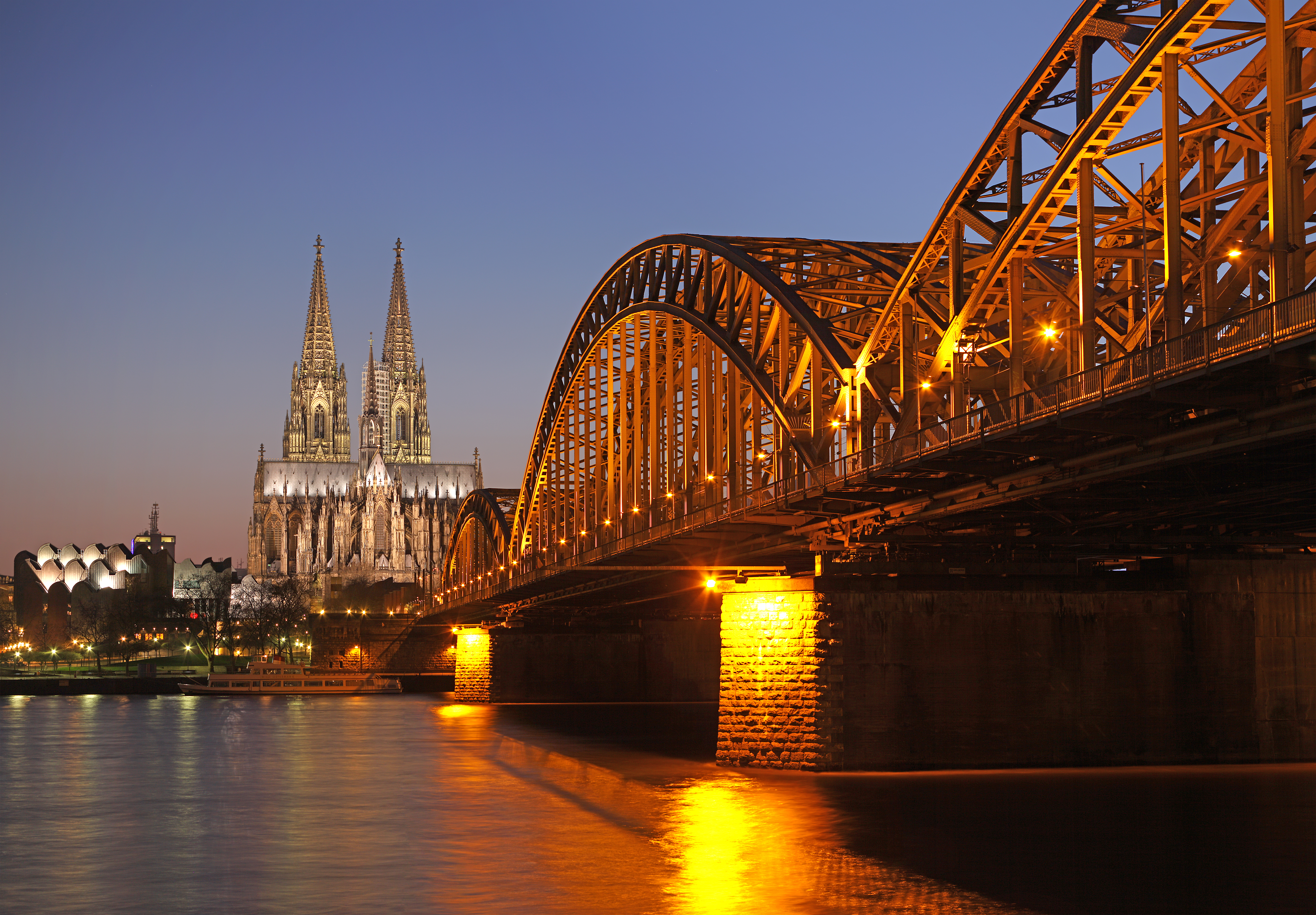
- Hohenzollern Bridge, with Cologne Cathedral and Museum Ludwig in the background
- Coordinates: see above
- Crossed: River Rhine
- Locale: Cologne, North Rhine-Westphalia, Germany
- Preceded by: Cathedral Bridge

Characteristics
- Design: Arch bridge with suspended deck (1911)
- Width: 32.45 metres (106.5 ft) (deck)
- Longest span: 167.75 metres (550.4 ft)
- No. of spans: 118.88 metres (390.0 ft) - 167.75 metres (550.4 ft) - 122.56 metres (402.1 ft) (1911)

History
- Architect: Franz Heinrich Schwechten (1911)
- Construction start: 1907
- Construction end: 1911
- Collapsed: 6 March 1945

The Hohenzollern Bridge (German: Hohenzollernbrücke) is a bridge crossing the river Rhine in the German city of Cologne (German: Köln). It crosses the Rhine at kilometre 688.5. Originally, the bridge was both a railway and road bridge. However, after its destruction in 1945 and subsequent reconstruction, the bridge has only been accessible to rail and pedestrian traffic.

It is the most heavily used railway bridge in Germany with more than 1,200 trains crossing daily, connecting the Köln Hauptbahnhof and Köln Messe/Deutz stations.

== History ==
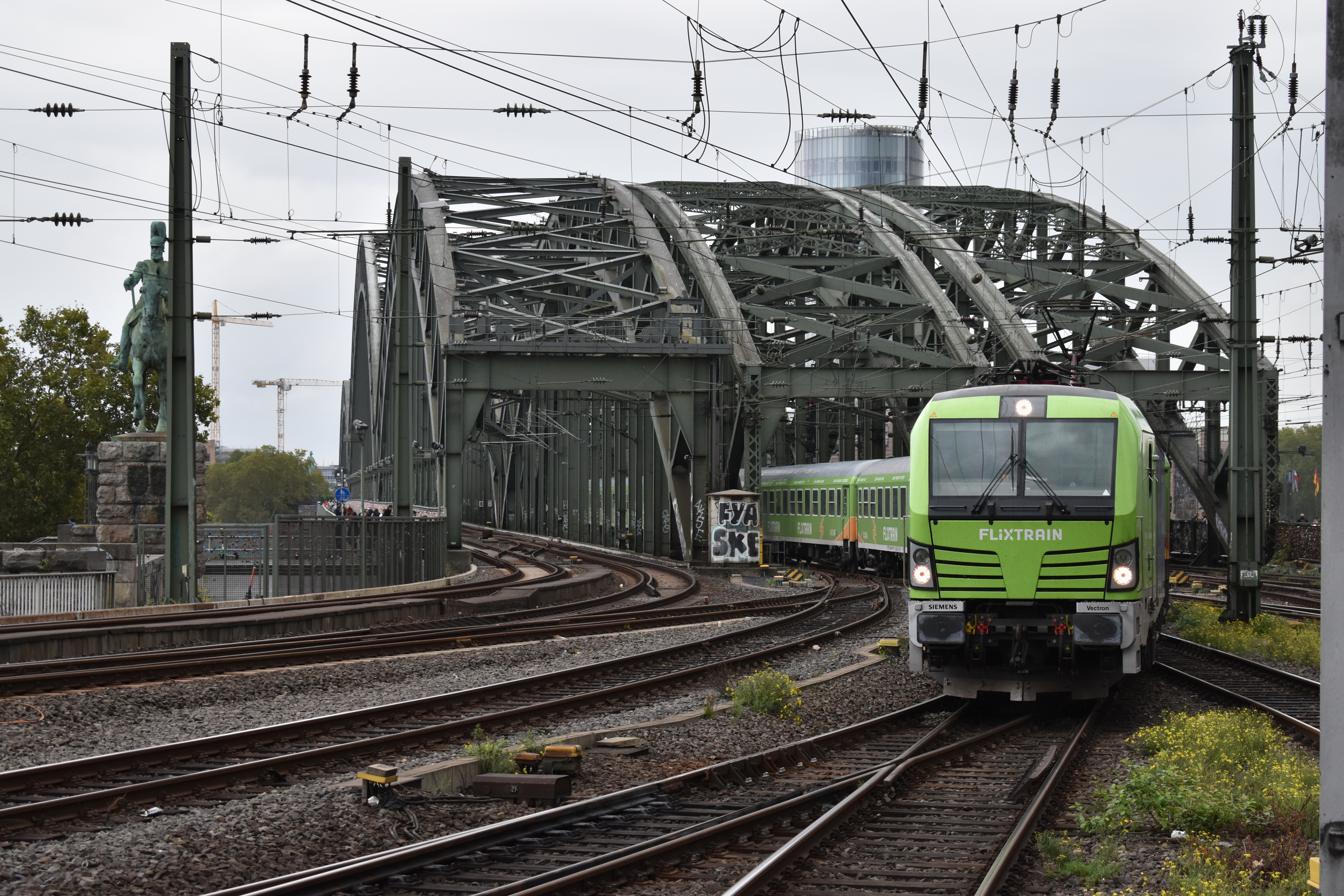
Long distance train passing the bridge

The bridge was constructed between 1907 and 1911 after the demolition of the old Cathedral Bridge (Dombrücke). The Cathedral Bridge was unable to handle the increasing rail traffic due to the inauguration of the Köln Hauptbahnhof. The new bridge was named after the House of Hohenzollern, the rulers of Prussia and German Emperors. (At the time, Cologne formed part of the Prussian Rhine Province.)

The president of the Railway Directorate Cologne, Paul von Breitenbach, started planning the construction and handed over this work to his successor Rudolf Schmidt in 1906. The railway engineer Fritz Beermann headed the project; under his direction Friedrich Dirksen worked out the designs. The construction of the Hohenzollern Bridge took place from 1907 to 1911; Kaiser Wilhelm II inaugurated it on 22 May 1911.

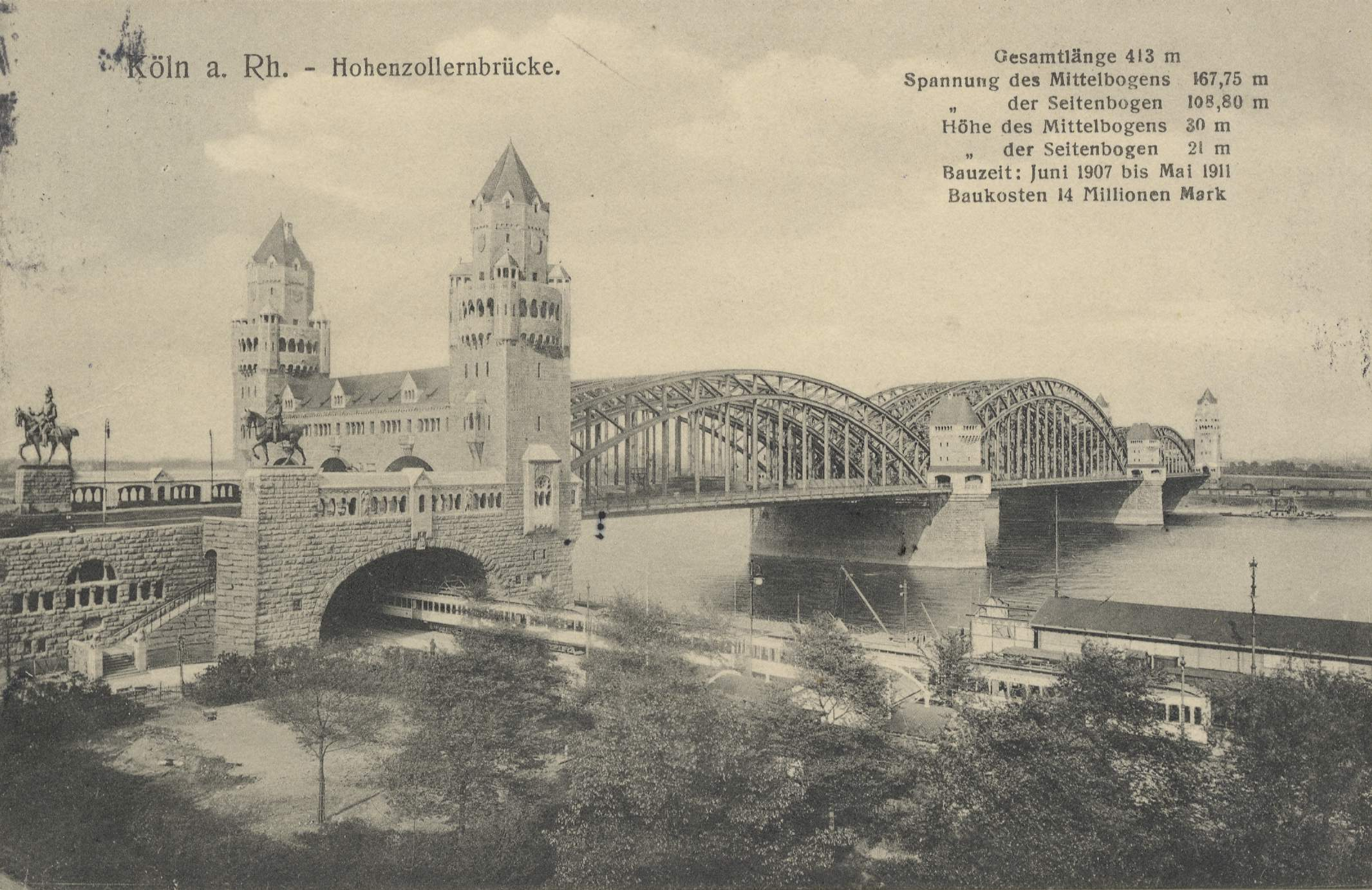
Hohenzollern Bridge, 1912

The bridge consisted of three adjacent bridge parts, each with three iron truss arches (passage openings) in the longitudinal direction to accommodate four railway tracks and a road. Although the location of the bridge and of the railway station were already controversial in previous structures, the Hohenzollern Bridge adopted the orientation of the previous bridge on the central axis of the cathedral.

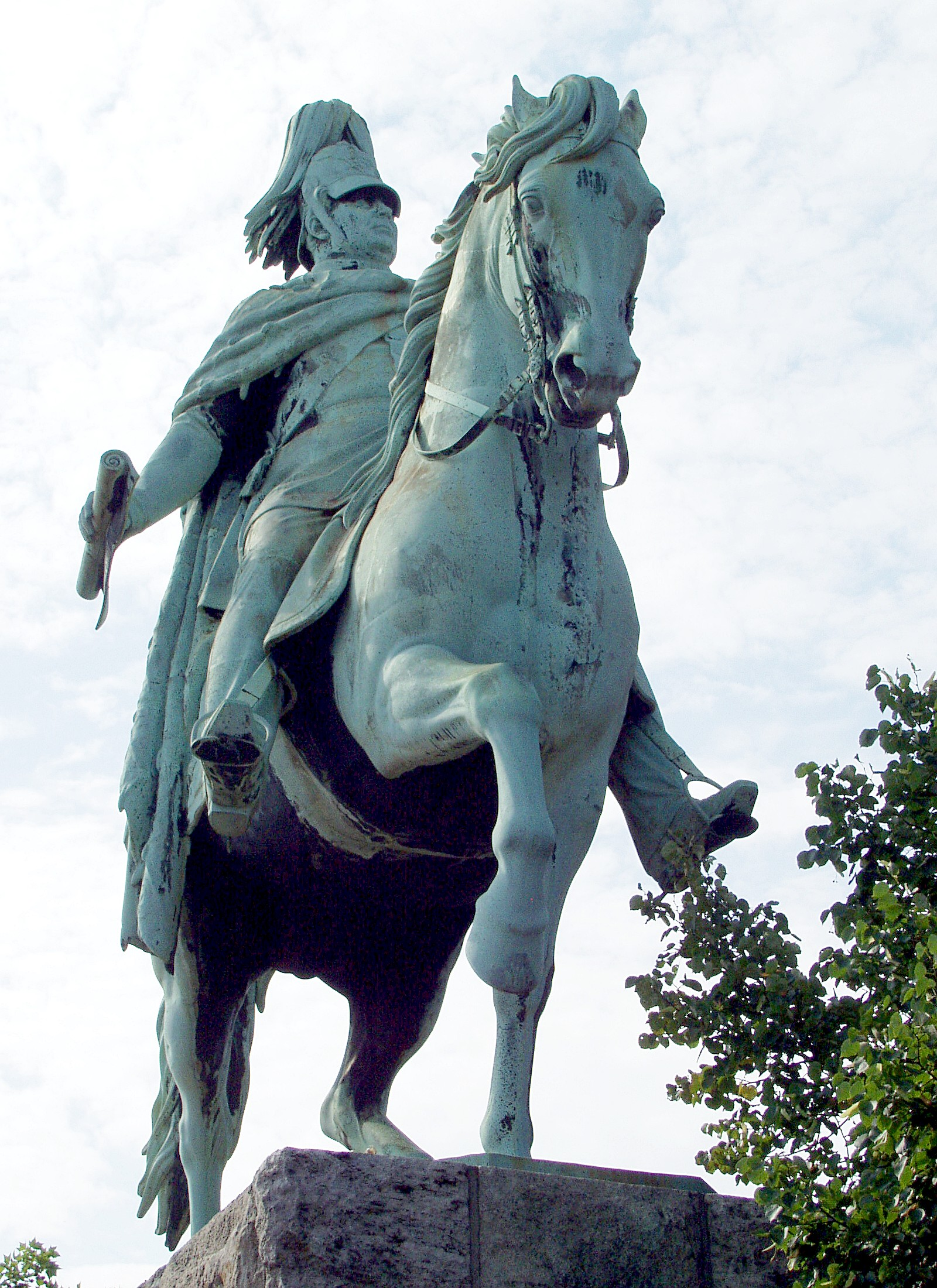
Friedrich Wilhelm IV
(north of the ramp on the right bank of the Rhine)

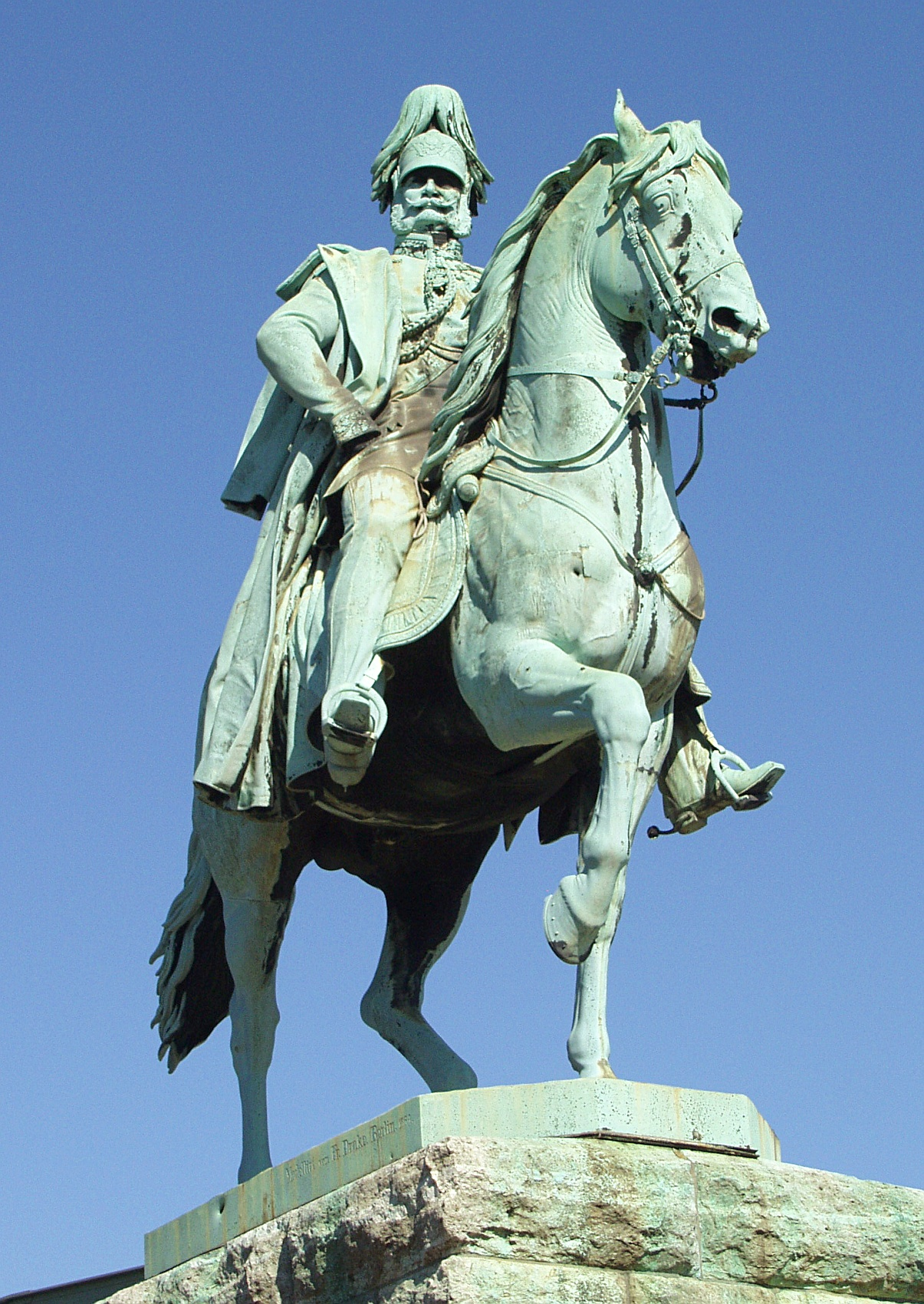
Wilhelm I
(south of the ramp on the right bank of the Rhine)

Four equestrian statues of Prussian kings and German emperors of the Hohenzollern family flank each ramp. The Cathedral Bridge was already adorned with the statues of Friedrich Wilhelm IV of Prussia by sculptor Gustav Blaeser and Kaiser Wilhelm I by Friedrich Drake, which now stand on the right (east) bank of the Rhine (see pictures above). In addition sculptor Louis Tuaillon made the equestrian statues of Friedrich III and, during his lifetime, of Wilhelm II, which were placed on the left (west) bank of the Rhine (see pictures below). The statues symbolize the era of Prussian rule in the Rhine Province.

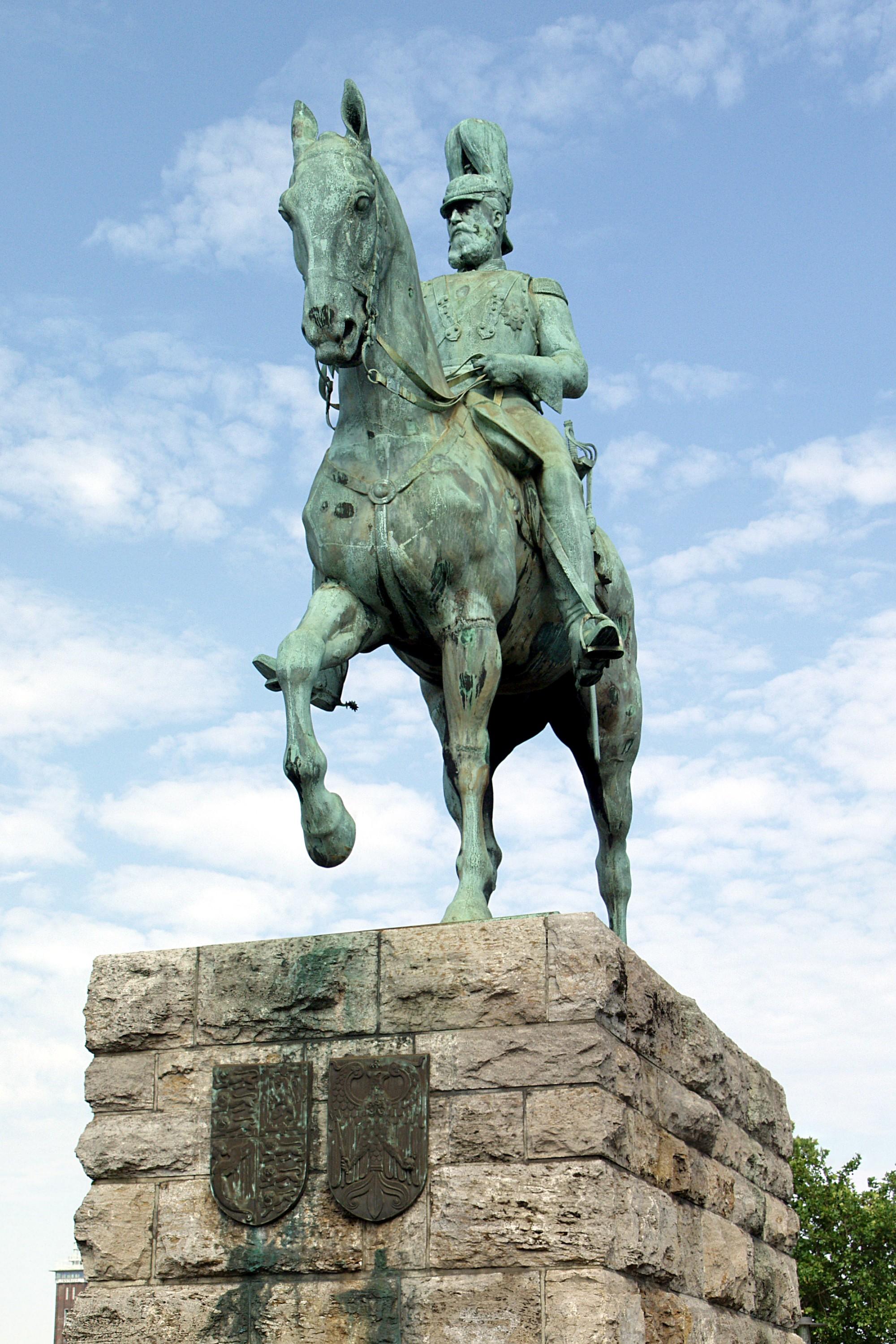
Friedrich III
(north of the ramp on the left bank of the Rhine)

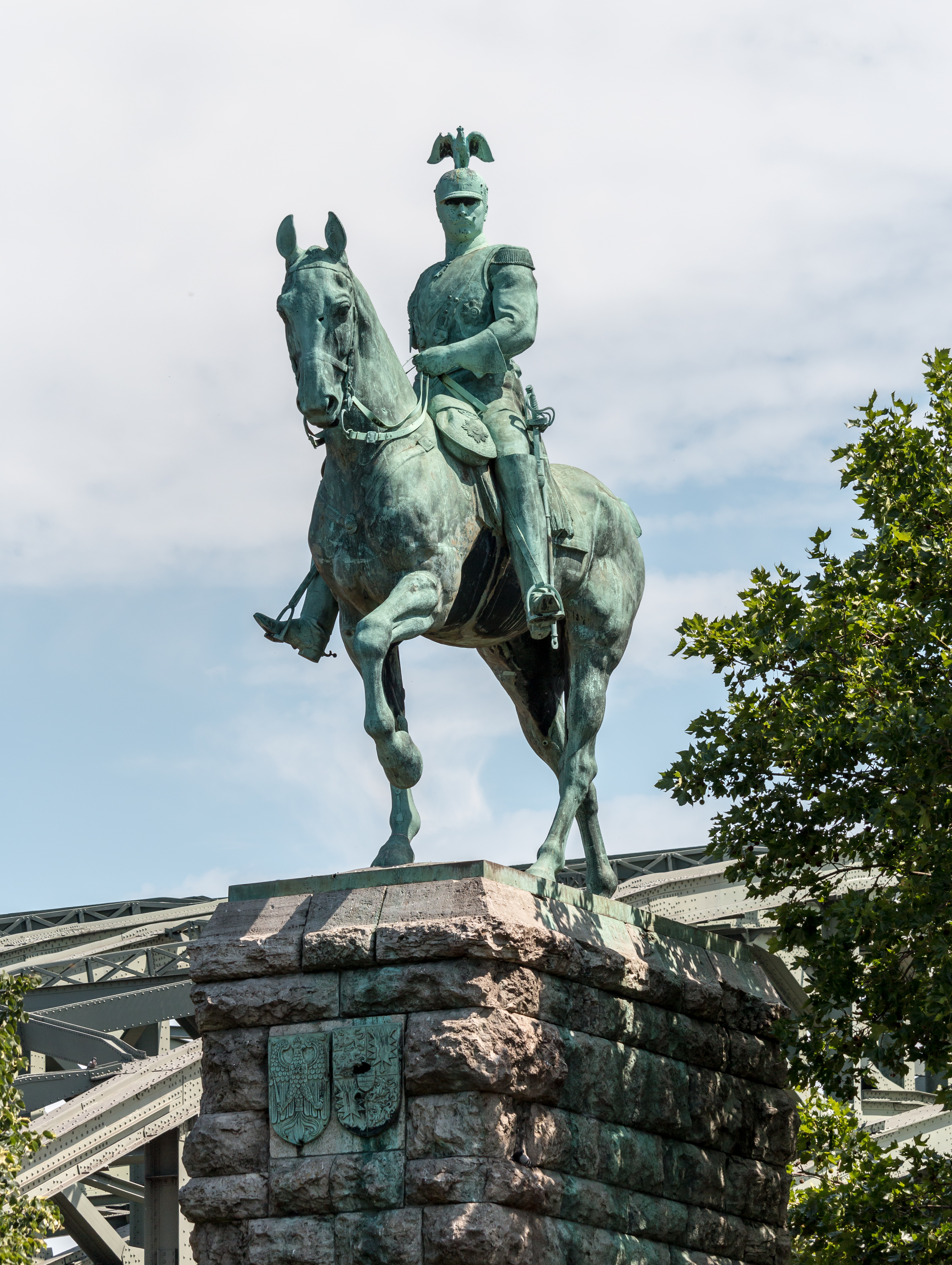
Wilhelm II
(south of the ramp on the left bank of the Rhine)

The Hohenzollern Bridge functioned as one of the most important bridges in Germany during World War II (1939-1945); even constant daily airstrikes did not badly damage it. On 6 March 1945, German military engineers blew up the bridge as Allied troops began their assault on Cologne.

After Germany surrendered on 8 May 1945, the bridge was initially made operational on a makeshift basis, but soon reconstruction began in earnest. By 8 May 1948, pedestrians could again use the Hohenzollern Bridge.

The southern road traffic decks were removed so that the bridge now only consisted of six individual bridge decks, built partly in their old form. The surviving portals and bridge towers were not repaired and were demolished in 1958. In 1959, reconstruction of the bridge was completed.

During the 1980s, the bridge was renovated with two new tracks. A minimal portion of the old road ramp on the Deutz side was preserved, together with cobblestones and tram tracks. The rest was removed in connection with the construction of the Kölntriangle development and converted into a pedestrian and bike path.

The Hohenzollern Bridge now regularly has over 1,200 trains passing through daily. The total length of the Hohenzollern Bridge is 409.19 meters (1,342.5 ft).

== Trivia ==
- Part of the Hohenzollern Bridge, which was blown up in 1945, was used to rebuild the last Ruhr Bridge, the Karl Lehr Bridge in Duisburg.
- For the Kirchentag 2007, the arches of the Hohenzollern Bridge were temporarily partially covered with red cloths, so that the bridge represented a stylized fish (the symbol of the Kirchentag).
- Since late summer 2008, the custom of love padlocks, which originated in Italy, has been placed on the bridge. The question of the weight and number of them, which occasionally arises in this context, was answered differently; estimates are said to range between two (April 2011) and 15 tons (September 2011) with a number of allegedly 40,000 love padlocks. The German Bahn saw no danger for the bridge statics with both weights. In June 2015, the number of locks was estimated at 500,000.
- At the eastern bridgehead on the Deutz side, the German Alpine Association has been maintaining a public climbing facility with a wall area of around 850m^{2} since 1998.

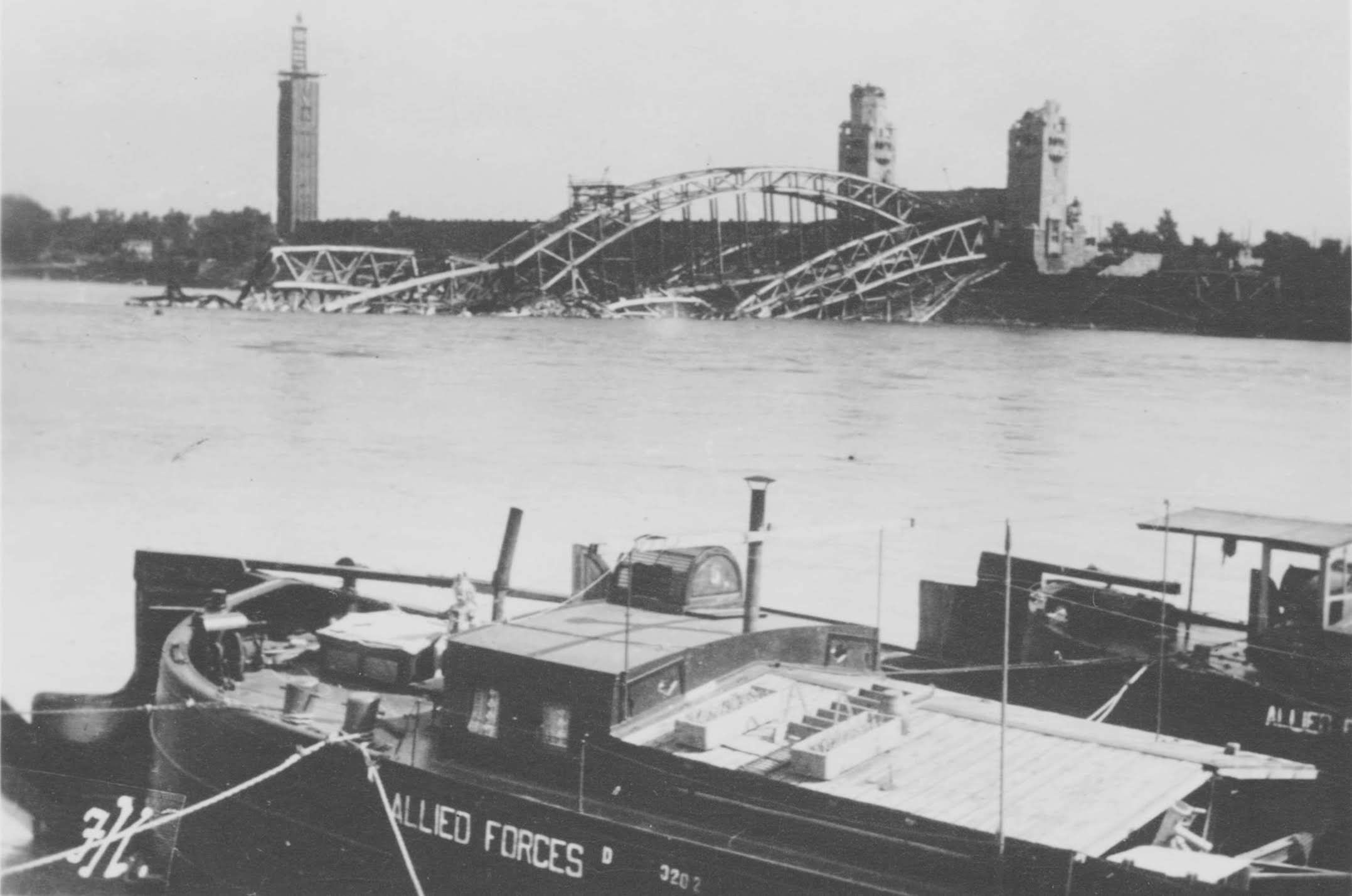
The Hohenzollern Bridge after its destruction in 1945

== See also ==
- List of bridges in Germany
- List of bridges over the Rhine
