= Cathedral Bridge =

Former road and rail bridge in Cologne, Germany

Cathedral Bridge Dombrücke
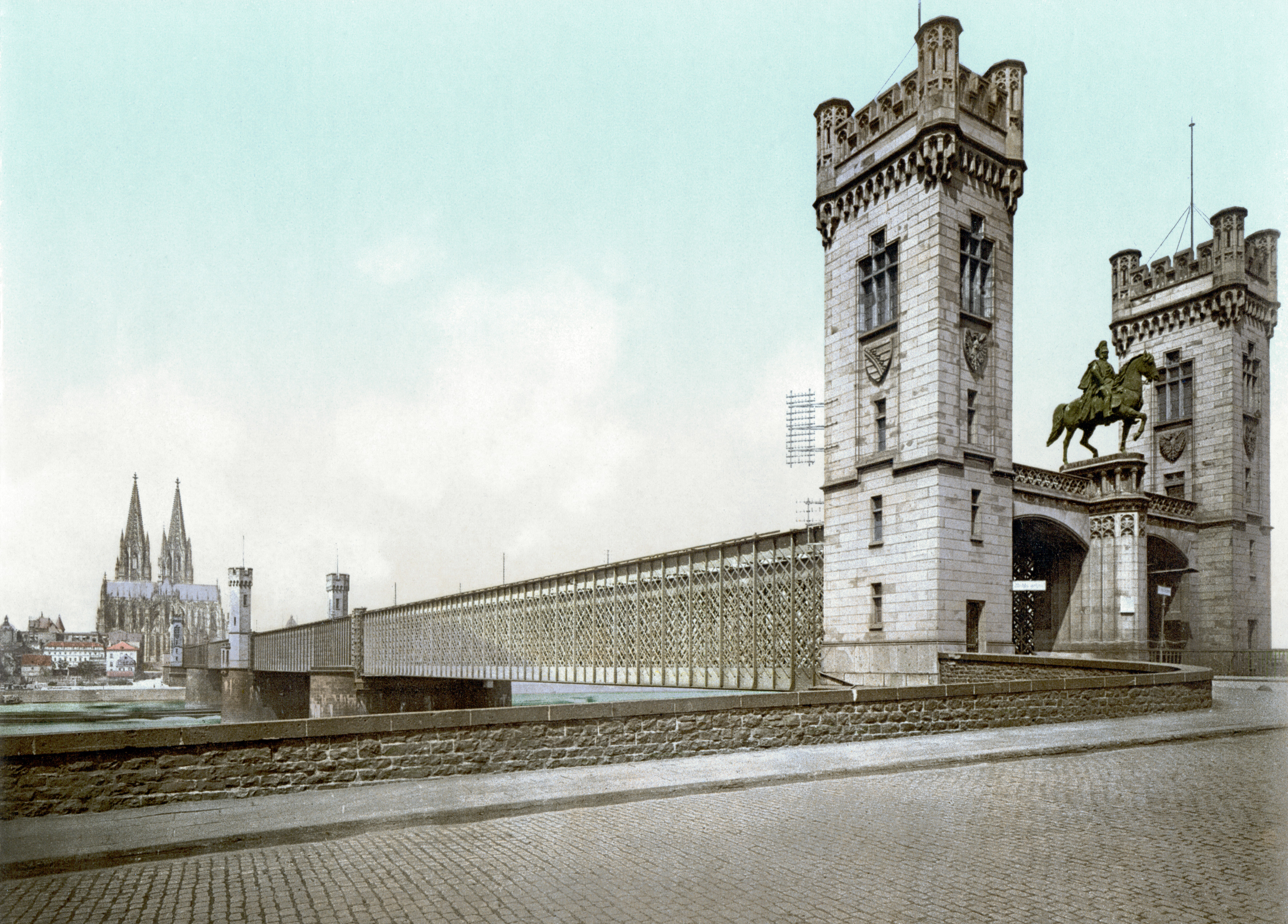
- Cathedral Bridge, c. 1900
- Coordinates: 50°56′29″N 6°57′58″E
- Carries: Two railway tracks, one two-way lane road
- Crosses: River Rhine
- Locale: Cologne, North Rhine-Westphalia, Germany
- Owner: Cologne-Minden Railway Company
- Followed by: Hohenzollernbrücke

Characteristics
- Design: Lattice truss bridge
- Material: Wrought iron (truss)
- Width: 16.73 metres (54.9 ft); Railway deck: 8.16 metres (26.8 ft); Road deck: 8.47 metres (27.8 ft)
- Longest span: 103.2 metres (339 ft)
- No. of spans: 2 × 19.85 metres (65.1 ft); 4 × 103.2 metres (339 ft)

History
- Architect: Johann Heinrich Strack
- Designer: Friedrich Wilhelm Wallbaum
- Engineering design by: Hermann Lohse
- Construction start: 1855
- Construction end: 1859
- Construction cost: 4 million Thalers (estimate)
- Inaugurated: 3 October 1859
- Closed: 1909

Location
- Interactive map of Cathedral Bridge

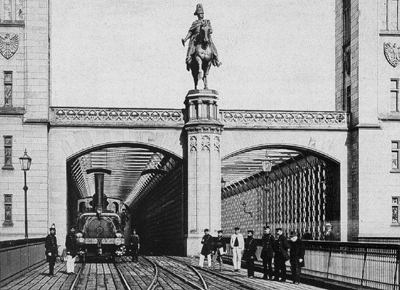
Cathedral Bridge with a locomotive of the Cologne-Minden Railway Company, c. 1867

The Cathedral Bridge (German: Dombrücke, pronounced [ˈdoːmˌbʁʏkə]) was a railway and street bridge crossing the river Rhine in the German city of Cologne. It was owned by the Cologne-Minden Railway Company and named after the Cologne Cathedral, which is located on the same longitudinal axis. It was built in combination with the original Central Station (German: Zentralbahnhof [tsɛnˈtʁaːlˌbaːnhoːf]) and a new ground-level railway track through the northern Old Town of the Cologne Innenstadt. As the Cathedral Bridge could not support the increased traffic of the new Köln Hauptbahnhof in 1894, it was replaced by the Hohenzollern Bridge in 1911.

The Cathedral Bridge was the second railway bridge to be built over the river Rhine, after the significantly shorter Waldshut–Koblenz Rhine Bridge with spans of up to 52 metres (171 ft), which was opened just a few months prior on 18 August 1859.

== History and construction ==
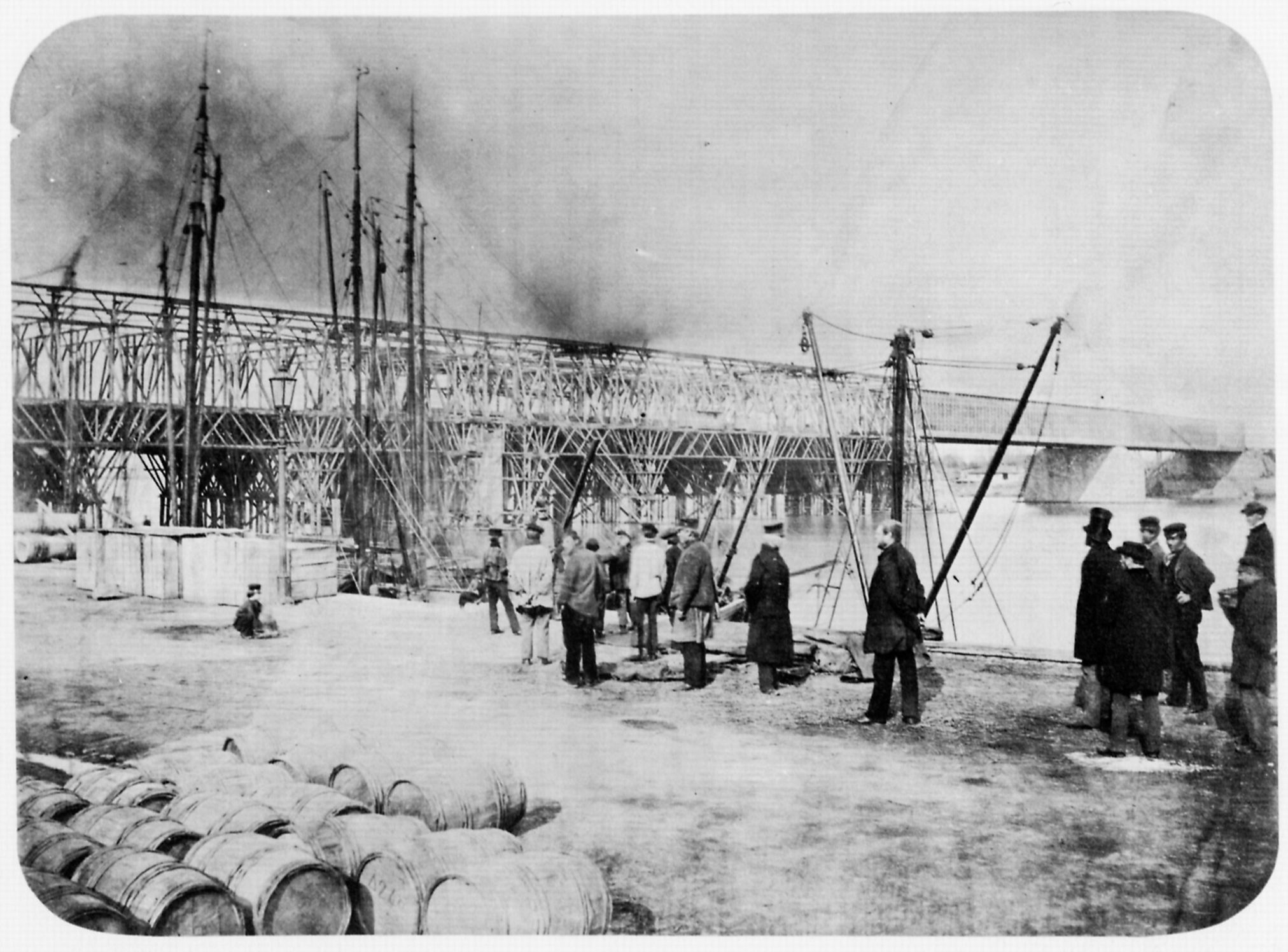
Cathedral Bridge during construction, 1859

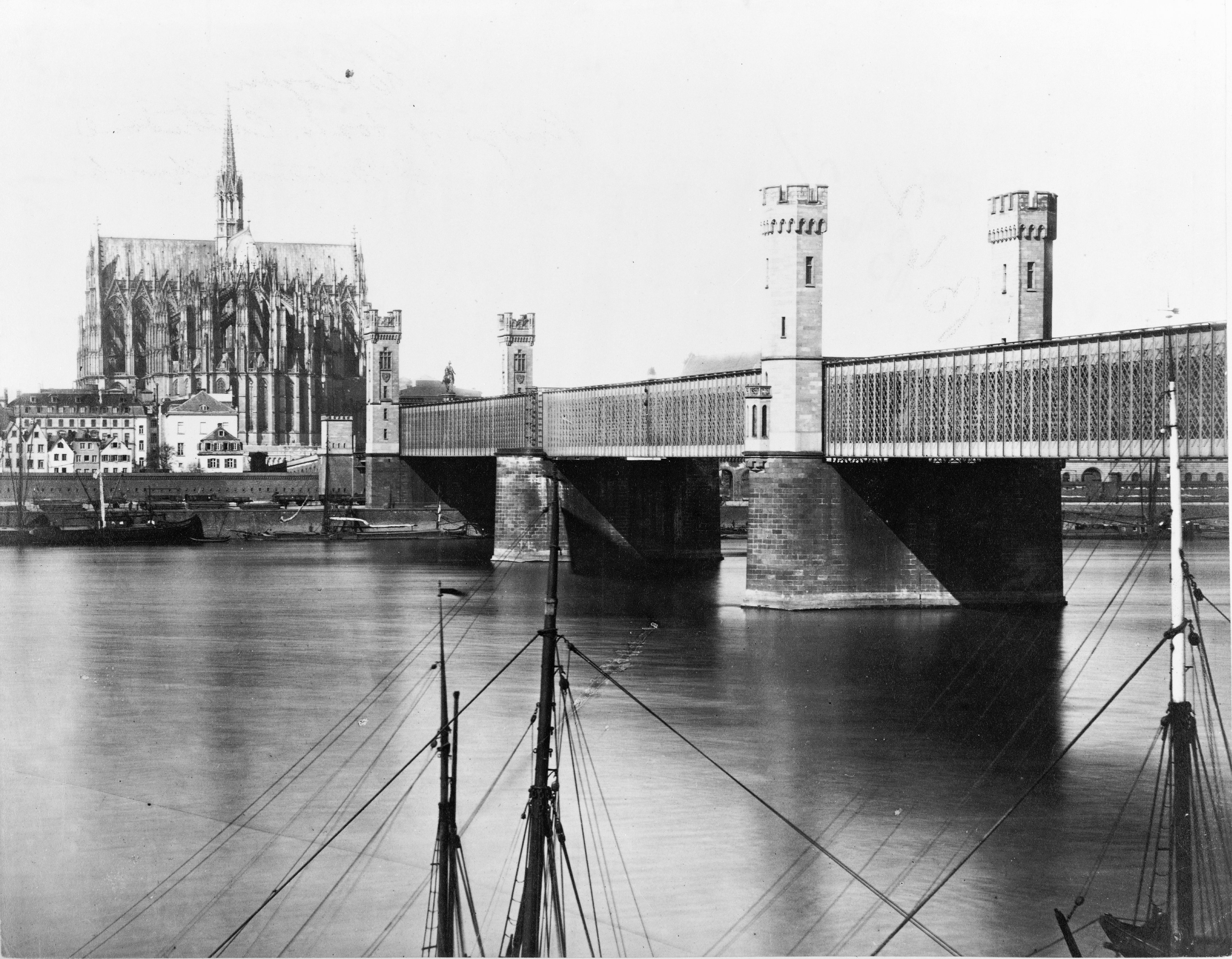
Cathedral bridge, c. 1870

The Prussian authorities pressed for a bridge due to increasing road traffic between Cologne and the eastern river bank. Before the Cathedral Bridge, passengers and goods had to be transported across the river by reaction ferry or pontoon bridge. The city council filed a request with Frederick William IV of Prussia in 1847, who through the Ministry of Trade, Commerce and Public Works appointed the Prussian chief civil engineer Karl Lentze to design the bridge.

The initial drawings of the bridge allowed only one horse-drawn carriage to cross the bridge. On the western bank, the road was led in northeastern direction past the Cologne Cathedral. The deck load was to be kept low, because at that time it was not possible to build heavy load bridges spanning over 100 metres (330 ft); the first bridge that was subjected to a full structural analysis was the Göltzsch Viaduct only 9 years prior, which is a brick arch bridge with its widest arch spanning 30.9 metres (101 ft) and having a width of 9 metres (30 ft) at the top. Conversely, the Cathedral Bridge was a lattice truss bridge with spans up to 103.2 metres (339 ft) and a collective width of 16.73 metres (54.9 ft). It might, however, be mentioned that the Britannia Bridge successfully took increasingly heavy railway trains across the Menai Strait from its opening in 1850 until it was seriously damaged by fire in 1970. Designed by Robert Stephenson as a tubular bridge, the longest spans of the Britannia Bridge measured 140 metres (460 ft), with a width of 16 metres (52 ft).

The wrought iron latticework of the Cathedral Bridge was designed by hydraulic engineer Hermann Lohse and formed an intricate network of diagonal lattices both on the inside and outside of the bridge. The bridge's gates, erected out of gray Udelfanger sandstone and holding heavy iron doors to close either side of the bridge, were designed by Heinrich Strack and added after the bridge had been completed. The combination of a cage-like structure that could be closed on either side inspired the local nickname "mouse trap" (Kölsch: Muusfall, pronounced [ˈmúsfal]). The bridge was also referred to as solid bridge, because it was the first immovable bridge in between Basel and the Netherlands since the Roman bridge, built near Cologne in the 4th century. Since the Middle Ages, reaction ferries formed flying bridges and since Prussian times, ship's bridges, a form of pontoon bridges, were also used.

The earthworks started on 6 June 1855; the foundation stone was laid by Frederick William IV four months later, on 3 October. Only after construction work had begun were the designs altered to include dual railway tracks on the northern downstream side of the bridge. Since the early 1850s, the Prussian authorities emphasized on constructing state railways. This opened up the possibility for the Cologne-Minden Railway Company to co-finance the bridge to extend the Deutz–Gießen line into the heart of Cologne, and integrate the previously separate railways on either side of the river Rhine. At the request of the Prussian Army, who had to approve every bridge design before it was carried out, it included a swing bridge on the western side which could be closed in case of war. The design was inspired by the railway bridges over the river Vistula at Tczew and over the river Nogat at Malbork, both of which were finished in 1857 as part of the Prussian Eastern Railway. The same chief superintendent for those bridges, Hermann Lohse, also led the construction work for the Cathedral Bridge.

The Cathedral Bridge was inaugurated on 3 October 1859, exactly four years after construction work had officially begun. Forty years after the construction, it was estimated the bridge had cost nearly 4 million (Prussian) thalers.

== Deconstruction ==
The bridge was unable to meet the increased demands imposed on it by the new Cologne Central Station (1894). After construction work had already started for the Hohenzollern Bridge in 1907, the Cathedral Bridge was deconstructed in stages between 1908 and 1910. The Hohenzollern Bridge was completed 1911, destroyed in 1945 during World War II and subsequently rebuilt. The current Hohenzollern Bridge's southern foundation is placed at almost exactly the same location as the Cathedral Bridge's foundation, and is the most heavily-used railway bridge in Germany.
