= West Rhine Railway =

Railway line in Germany

Coordinates: 50°21′40″N 7°35′25″E

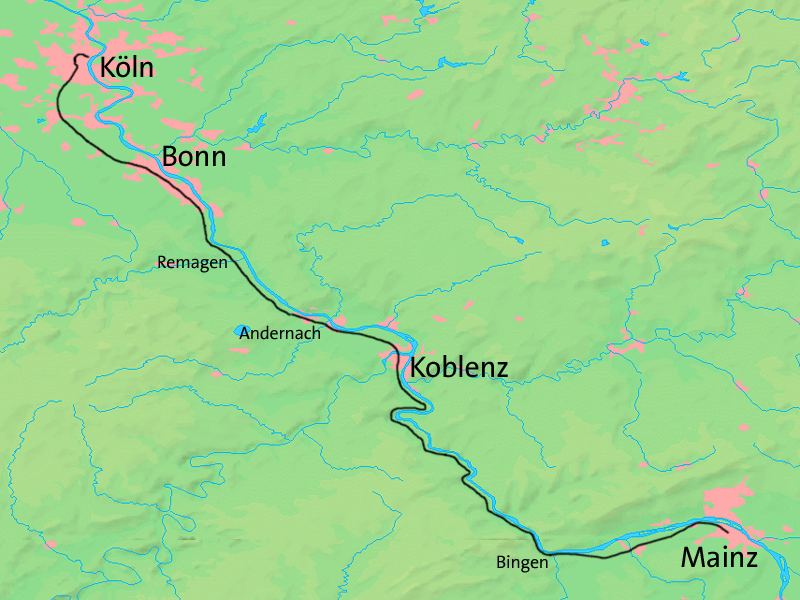

Overview
- Other name: Left Rhine Railway
- Native name: Linke Rheinstrecke
- Line number: 2630
- Locale: North Rhine-Westphalia, Rhineland-Palatinate and Hesse, Germany
- Termini: Cologne; Mainz

Service
- Route number: 470

Technical
- Line length: 152 km (94 mi)
- Track gauge: 1,435 mm (4 ft 8 1/2 in) standard gauge
- Electrification: 15 kV/16.7 Hz AC Overhead catenary
- Operating speed: 160 km/h (99 mph) (max)
- Maximum incline: < 0.02%

The West Rhine railway (German: Linke Rheinstrecke, literally 'left (bank of the) Rhine route') is a famously picturesque, double-track electrified railway line running for 185 km from Cologne via Bonn, Koblenz, and Bingen to Mainz. It is situated close to the western (left) bank of the river Rhine and mostly aligned to allow 160 km/h operation between Cologne and Koblenz and between Bingen and Mainz. Line speed between Koblenz and Bingen is restricted by the meandering nature of the Rhine Gorge, a UNESCO World Heritage Site.

== History ==
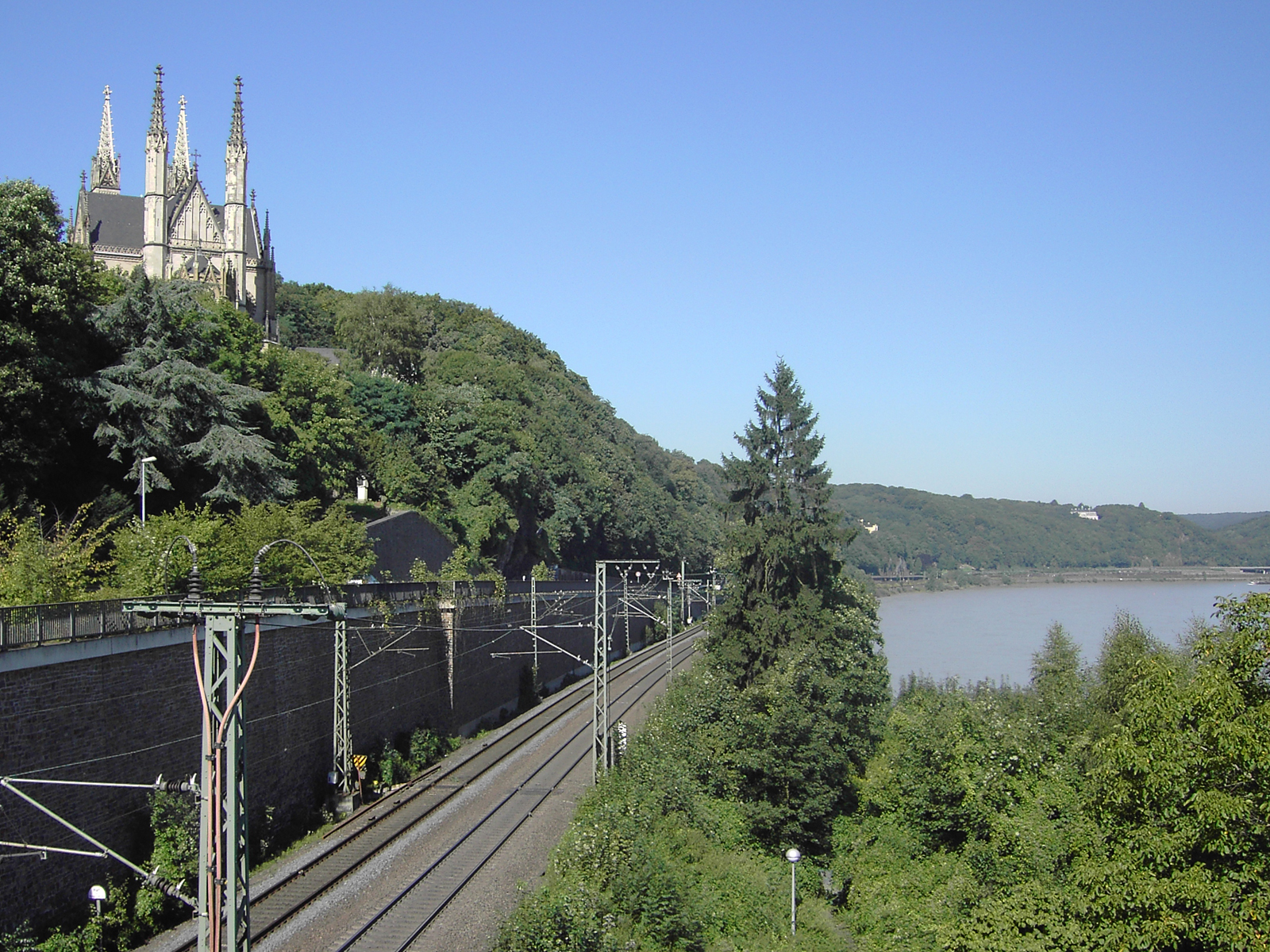
West Rhine railway, near Remagen

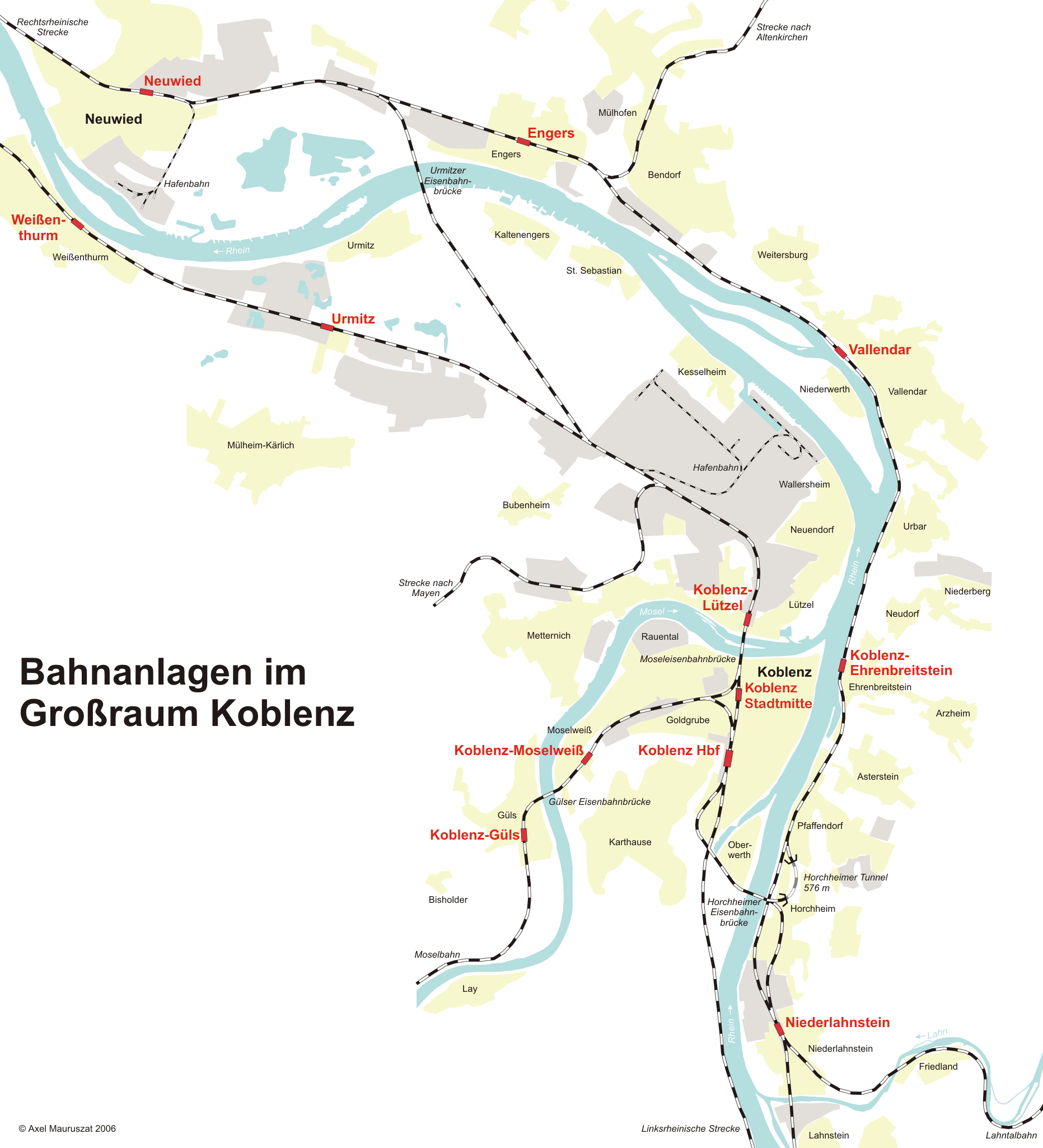
Map of railway lines in the Koblenz area

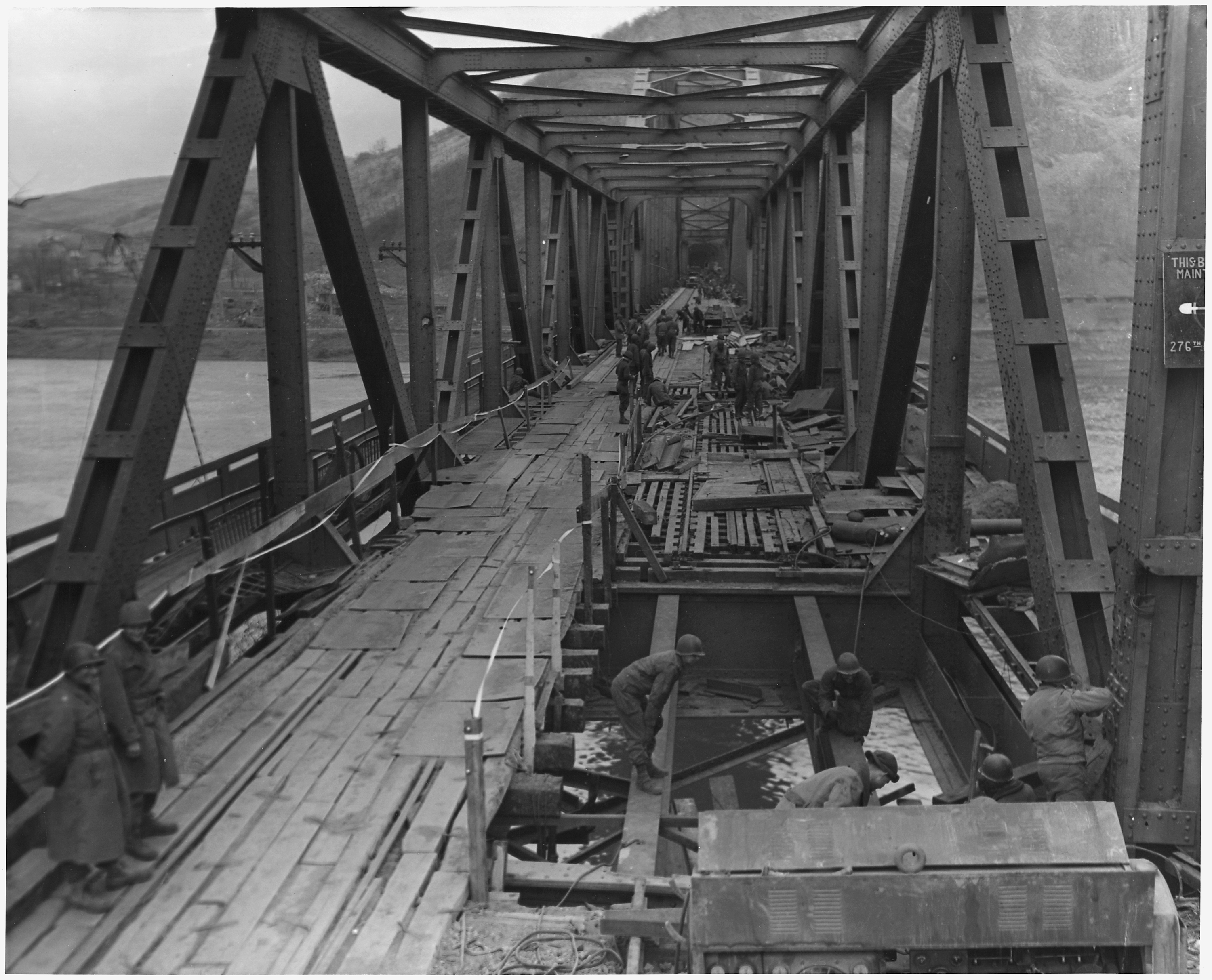
Ludendorff Bridge on 17 March 1945 four hours before the collapse

The first section of the line opened on 15 February 1844, by the Bonn–Cologne Railway Company (Bonn-Cölner Eisenbahn-Gesellschaft) between the former station of Cologne St. Pantaleon Cologne and Bonn. It was extended on 21 January 1856, south to Rolandseck station and in 1859 north to the Cologne central station.

After the takeover by the Rhenish Railway Company (Rheinische Eisenbahn Gesellschaft, RhE) on 1 January 1857 the line was extended in 1858 through Remagen and Andernach and crossed the Moselle to Koblenz via the Moselle railway bridge, opened on 11 November 1858. The particularly beautiful section of the line between Koblenz and Bingerbrück (now called Bingen Hbf), which runs close to the river through this winding section of the Rhine Valley was opened on 15 December 1859. Bingerbrück station was at the time on the border of the Kingdom of Prussia and the Grand Duchy of Hesse. Here it connected with the Rhine-Main line of the Hessian Ludwig Railway (Hessische Ludwigsbahn), opened on 17 October 1859, from Mainz and the Nahe Valley Railway to Saarbrücken.

In Koblenz, the Pfaffendorf Bridge over the Rhine was completed in 1864 to connect to the Right Rhine line to Niederlahnstein and Wiesbaden. With the construction of the Horchheim Bridge south of Koblenz, opened in 1879, and the Urmitz Bridge north of Koblenz, opened in 1918, this bridge was progressively given over to pedestrian, vehicular and, eventually, tram traffic and the last train used it at the outbreak of World War I in August 1914.

From 1861 the Nassau State Railways established a train ferry between Bingen and Rüdesheim am Rhein; this was converted to a passenger ferry in 1900. From 1870 to 1914 another train ferry operated between Bonn and Oberkassel to transfer trains between the West Rhine line and the East Rhine railway.

During the First World War three strategic Rhine crossings were built at the request of the German generals in order to bring troops and war materials to the Western Front. The Bingen–Rüdesheim ferry was replaced by the Hindenburg Bridge, built between 1913 and 1915 and connecting the East Rhine line with the West Rhine railway and the Nahe Valley Railway. From 1916 to 1918, the Neuwied–Koblenz line, including the Crown Prince Wilhelm Bridge, was built between Urmitz and Neuwied-Engers. The Ludendorff Bridge between Erpel and Remagen was built from 1916 to 1919. It connected the East and West Rhine railway lines and the strategically important Ahr Valley Railway. The Hindenburg, Ludendorff and Kronprinz-Wilhelm Bridges were destroyed in World War II. Only the Crown Prince Wilhelm Bridge was rebuilt, as the Urmitz bridge, in 1954.

The line was electrified in 1959.

== Current operations ==
Until the opening of the Cologne-Frankfurt high-speed rail line, the line was one of the busiest in Germany. The fastest trains connecting the Rhineland and southern Germany ran on the line. The importance of the line for long distance travel has diminished since the opening of the high-speed line. The line is now generally used by one InterCity or Intercity-Express service (stopping at Bonn, Koblenz and Mainz) each hour, one Regional-Express train each hour (the Rhein-Express to Koblenz Hauptbahnhof and one RegionalBahn (stopping) train each hour in each direction, as well as by many freight trains. Before the opening of the high-speed line, freight trains were largely restricted to the Right Rhine line, but with the increased availability of train paths on the Left Rhine line many of them are now routed over it.
