= Pfaffendorf Bridge =

Bridge over the Rhine

Coordinates: 50°21′11″N 7°36′17″E

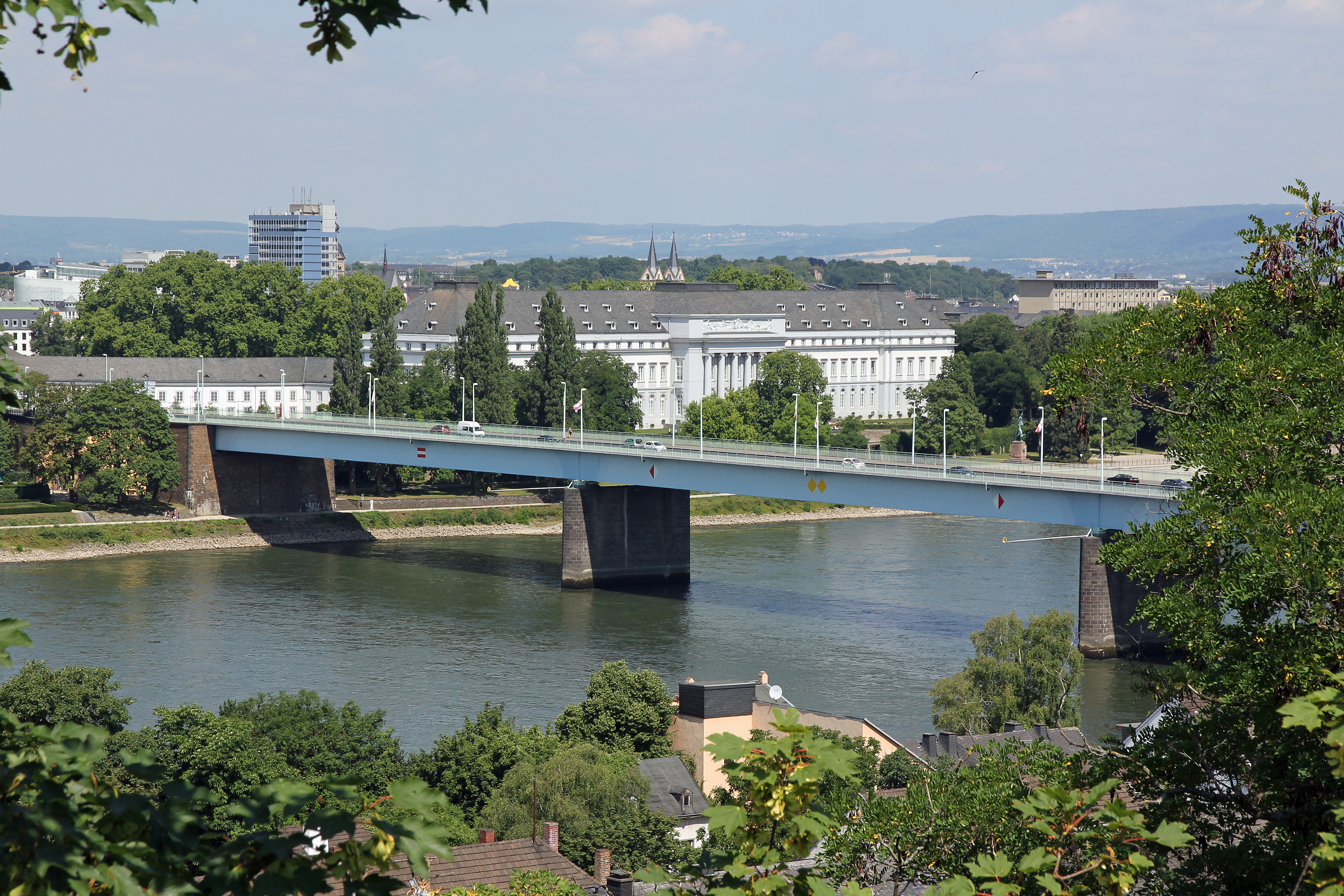
The Pfaffendorf Bridge with the Electoral Palace behind

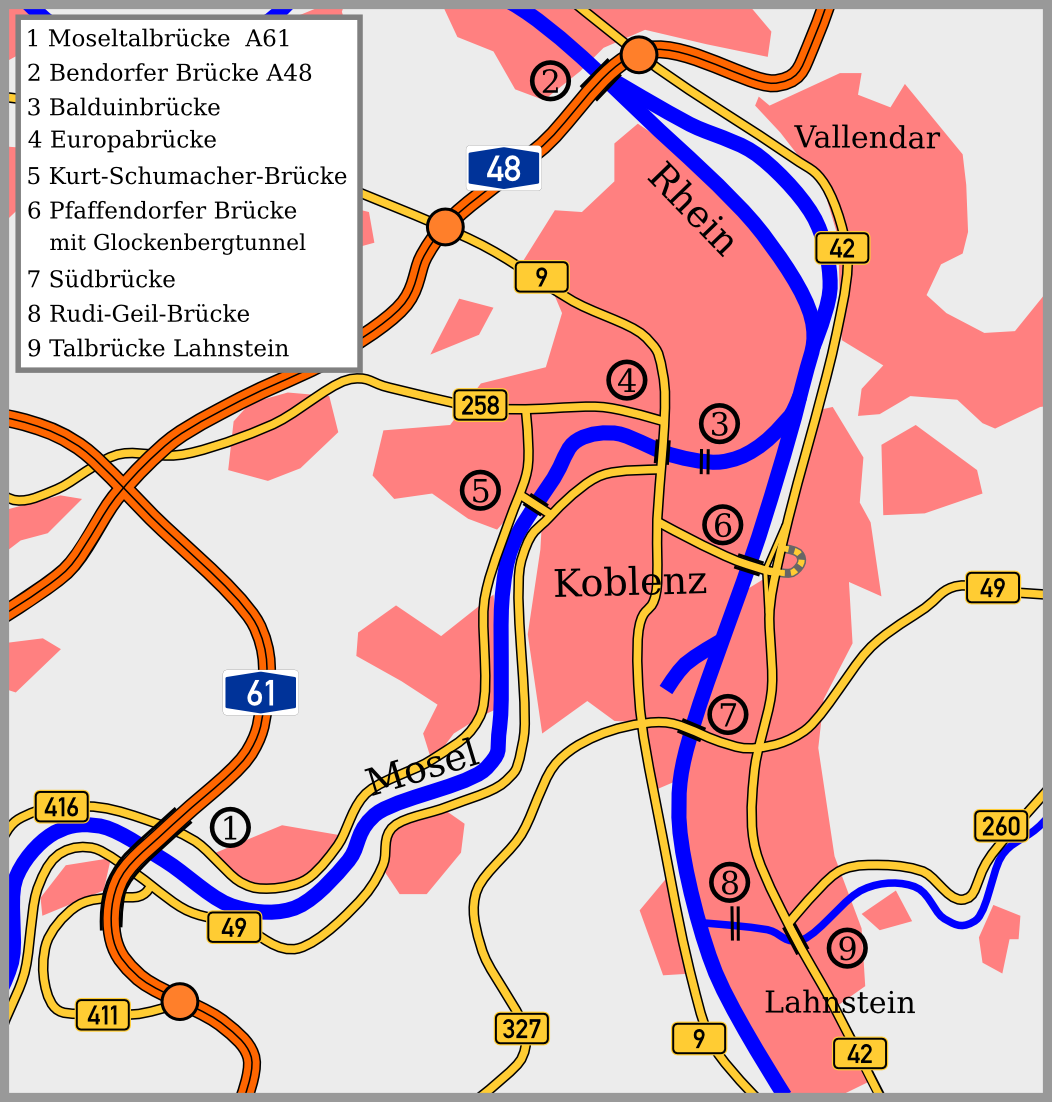
6 = Pfaffendorf Bridge

The Pfaffendorf Bridge (German: Pfaffendorfer Brücke) is the oldest bridge over the Rhine at Koblenz, in the German state of Rhineland-Palatinate. It carries federal highway B 49 over the Rhine, and connects central Koblenz with the suburbs of Pfaffendorf and Ehrenbreitstein. The first bridge was completed in 1864. It was destroyed in the Second World War and the current bridge was opened in 1953.

== First bridge across the Rhine ==
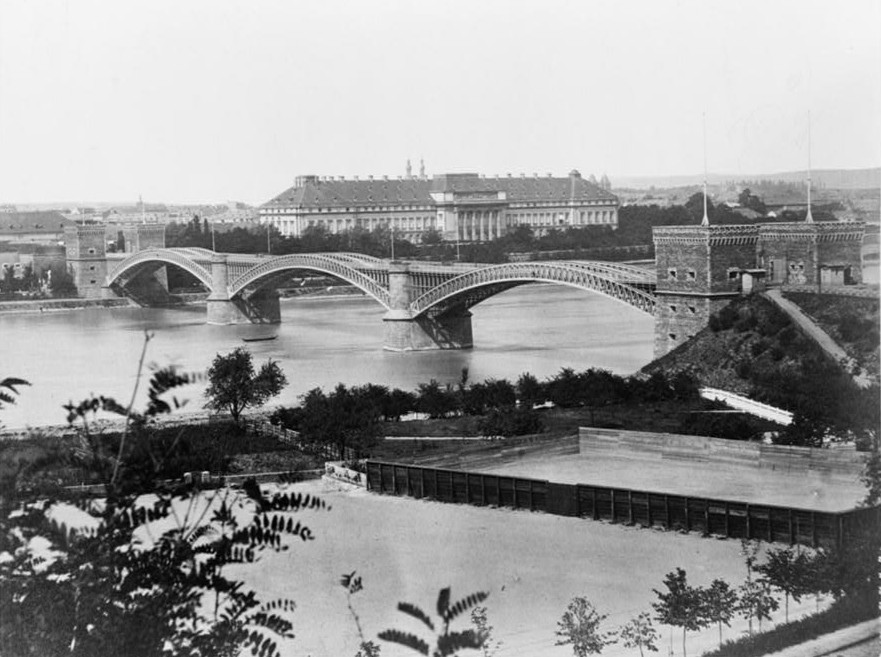
Pfaffendorf Bridge in 1900

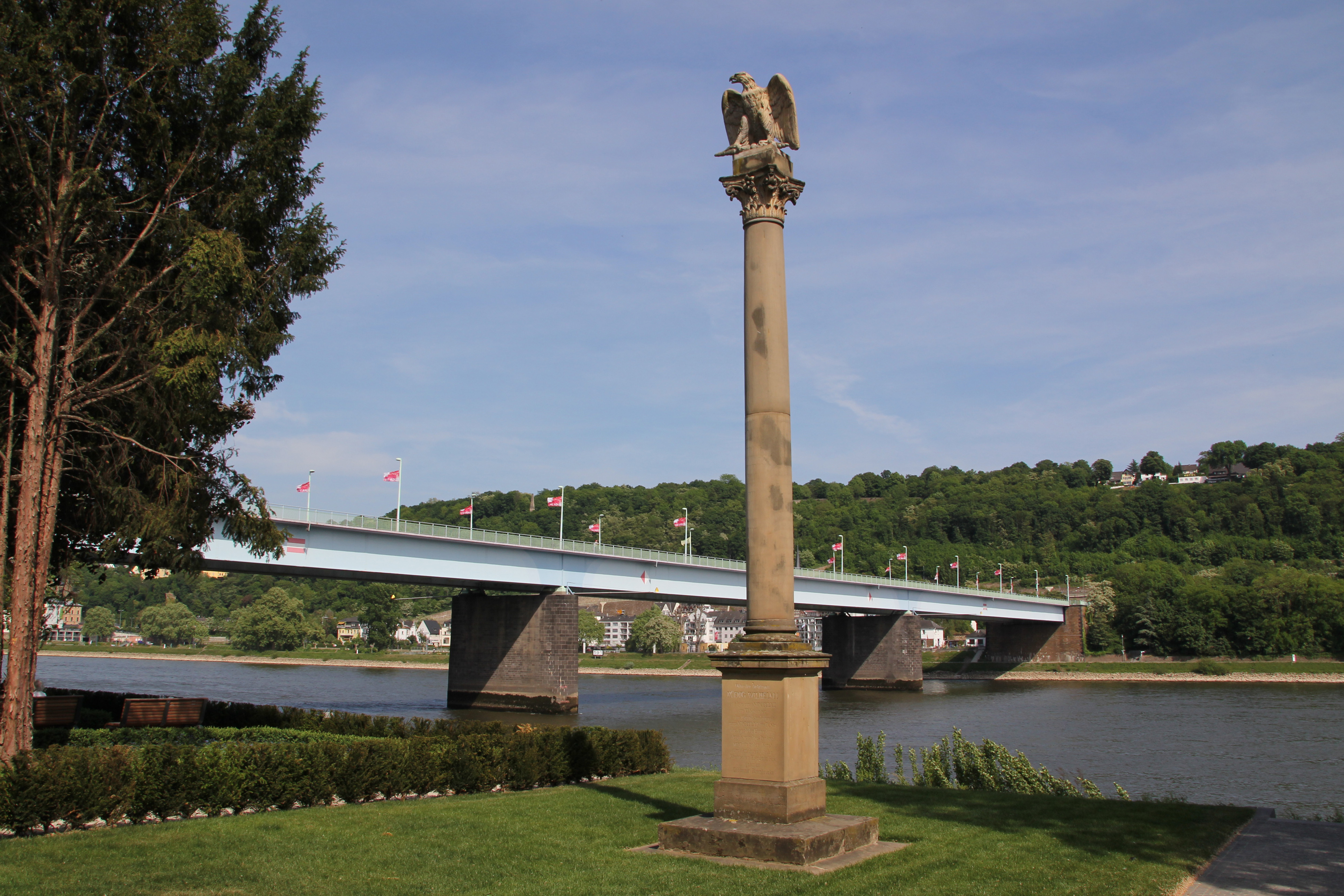
Bridge memorial

A column on the Rhine shores (opposite the Weindorf Koblenz restaurant) commemorates the original construction of the Pfaffendorf Bridge between 1862 and 1864. According to the inscription on the front of the column, the foundation stone was laid in the reign of King William I on 11 November 1862 and inaugurated on 9 May 1864.

It was initially just a railway bridge, over which the trains of the Rhenish Railway Company ran to Oberlahnstein, connecting the left and right bank lines. It had three spans constructed of wrought iron, each 97 m long. The height of the arch was 3.14 m. There were two 10 metre-high towers at each end of the bridge, which had iron bars that could be used to seal off the bridge in the event of war. In addition, the right bank was protected by the Horchheim Gate Fortress (Horchheimer Torbefestigung) built between 1864 and 1867.

The bridge was built as the result of negotiations between Prussia and the Duchy of Nassau. Prussia wanted a line from the existing left bank line to connect with the eastern hinterland of the Rhine that would not be quickly interrupted by enemy advances in case of a war with France. Nassau, however, advocated a line along the right bank of the Rhine. At the same time, Nassau was looking for an opportunity to link the left bank railway line to its own rail network. Under an agreement signed in 1857, on the one hand Nassau granted a concession for the building of the Lahntal railway through its territory, via the Prussian cities of Gießen and Wetzlar, to Koblenz, and on the other hand, the construction of the Pfaffendorf Bridge was given the go-ahead.

Originally the Pfaffendorf bridge could not be used for road or pedestrian traffic, but as early as 1865, the southern side could be used for general traffic at times when no trains were running. With the construction of the Horchheim Railway Bridge in 1879, the south side of the bridge became permanently available for road traffic.

In 1899, the Coblenzer Straßenbahn-Gesellschaft (Koblenz Tramway Company) was permitted to build a tram line over the bridge in order to expand its network on the eastern bank. The last trains crossed the Pfaffendorf Bridge at the beginning of the First World War in August 1914.

=== Conversion to a road bridge ===
In 1932, the City of Koblenz owned the Pfaffendorf Bridge and decided to reconstruct it. In fact, it was almost totally rebuilt. With four road lanes and two pedestrian walkways, it had a total width of 16 m. The bridge towers were demolished by the council and a new connection was provided to the Ehrenbreitstein–Lahnstein bypass (now federal highway B 42) on the east bank, across the railway line.

== War damage and reconstruction ==
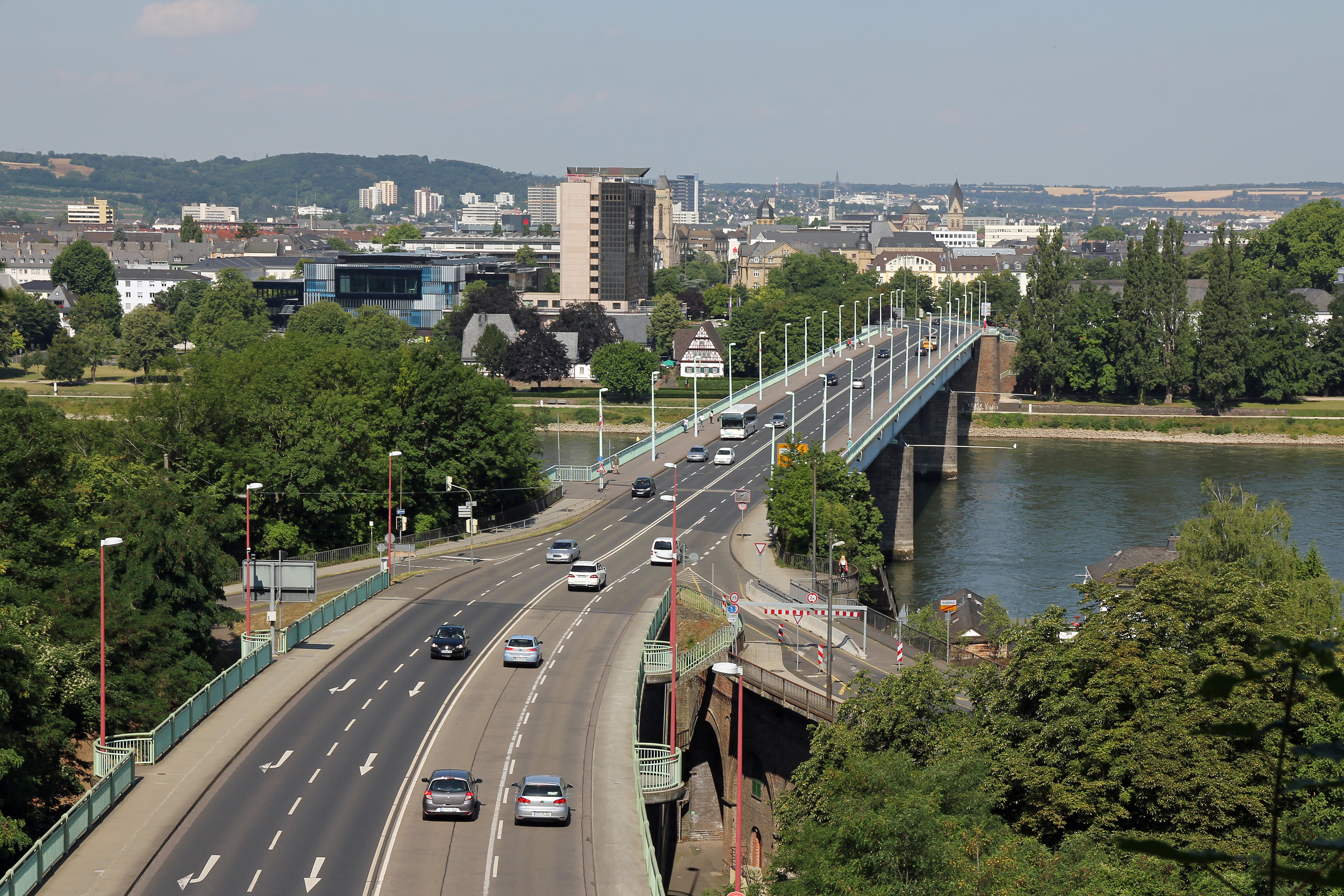
View from Glockenberg tunnel

Like all bridges in Koblenz, the Pfaffendorf Bridge was dynamited on 7 March 1945 by German troops. Early in 1946, construction of a temporary bridge began. Approval was given in 1950 for the rebuilding of a new fixed bridge over the Rhine and a steel girder design was chosen. The construction of the new bridge would allow the pontoon bridge to be removed. The new Pfaffendorf Bridge had a four-lane roadway, 1.6 m wide bike paths on both sides, and 2.6 m wide footpaths. On 18 July 1953, the bridge was opened to traffic, and the temporary bridge was then removed.

A new grade-separated connection from the Pfaffendorf Bridge to the B 42, the 294-metre-long Glockenberg Tunnel, was opened on 27 June 2003, after 12 years of construction.

Since 2023, the bridge is being replaced in complex process, due to structural damages. A new construction is build directly adjacent downstream. After traffic is rerouted, the deconstruction of the old bridge and restoration of historically protected parts will be undertaken. The replacement building is then to be shifted on the reconstructed and modernized abutment.
