= Tiefenrother Höhe =

Mountain in Hesse, Germany

Coordinates: 50°49′N 8°10′E

Highest point
- Elevation: 552.3 m (1,812 ft)

Geography
- Location: Hesse, Germany

Tiefenrother Höhe is a mountain of Hesse, Germany.
