= Oberlahnstein =

- Flag Coat of arms

- Coordinates: 50°18′N 7°37′E

Oberlahnstein (German pronunciation: [oːbɐˈlaːnʃtaɪn]) is a part of the city of Lahnstein in Rhineland-Palatinate in Germany. It lies on the right bank of the Rhine, at the confluence of the Lahn 4 m. above Koblenz, on the Right Rhine railway from Cologne to Frankfurt-on-Main.

Oberlahnstein still retains parts of its ancient walls and towers, and possesses a castle, the Schloss Martinsburg, formerly the residence of the electors of Mainz, and the chapel, Marien Kapelle, in which the German king Wenceslaus was deposed by the electors in 1400. Near the town is the castle of Lahneck, built about 1290, destroyed by the French in 1689, and restored in 1854. In the neighborhood are lead and silver mines.
