= Früh =

Früh or Frueh is a German surname. It comes from Middle High German vrū or vruo "early", applied as a nickname for an early riser or a hardworking person, or alternatively for a child born early or before marriage. There are 1011 people with this surname in Germany, mostly in the southwest, in the state of Baden-Württemberg. Notable people with the surname include:

- Bartley Christopher Frueh (born 1963), American clinical psychologist and author
- Dallas Frueh (born 2000), American racing driver
- Huldreich Georg Früh (1903–1945), Swiss composer
- Joanna Frueh (1948–2020), American artist, writer, and feminist scholar
- Johann Jakob Früh (1852–1938), Swiss geographer and geologist
- Kurt Früh (1915–1979), Swiss film director
- Oscar Früh (1891–1949), Swiss painter

== German companies ==
- Cölner Hofbräu Früh, private brewery for top-fermented beer called Kölsch
- Max Früh, German specialist construction company mostly building bridges

== See also ==
- The dictionary definition of früh at Wiktionary
