= List of bridges over the Rhine =

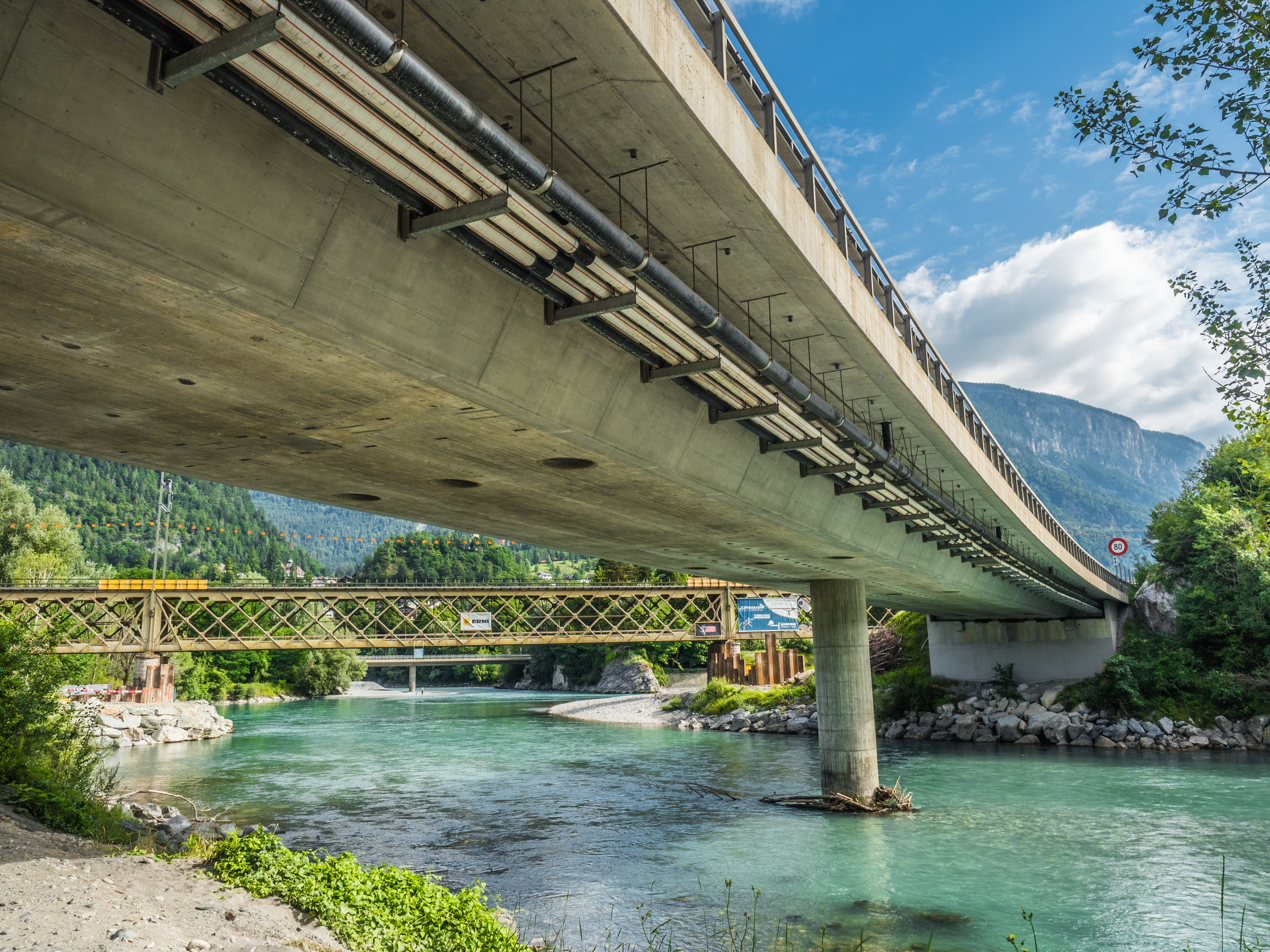
Road and railway bridges over the Hinterrhein near Reichenau-Tamins

This is a list of bridges over the River Rhine, both present and past.

The Rhine is divided into sections (from source to delta): Vorderrhein / Hinterrhein, Alpine Rhine (Alpenrhein), Seerhein (between the lower and upper Lake Constance), High Rhine (Hochrhein), Upper Rhine (Oberrhein), Middle Rhine, Lower Rhine and Rhine delta. As a result of the straightening of the Alpine Rhine, there are now two cut-off river sections, both named Alter Rhein (lit. 'Old Rhine'), which are crossed by bridges.

== List ==
This list includes both existing and former bridges over the Rhine, sorted by the sections of the river. Within each section, bridges are listed according to their sequence in direction of flow of the river. Railway bridges are marked with an *, tramway bridges with a #. Railway bridges, are listed with the nearest train stations on the left and right banks. Otherwise the two municipalities are given.

=== Vorderrhein ===
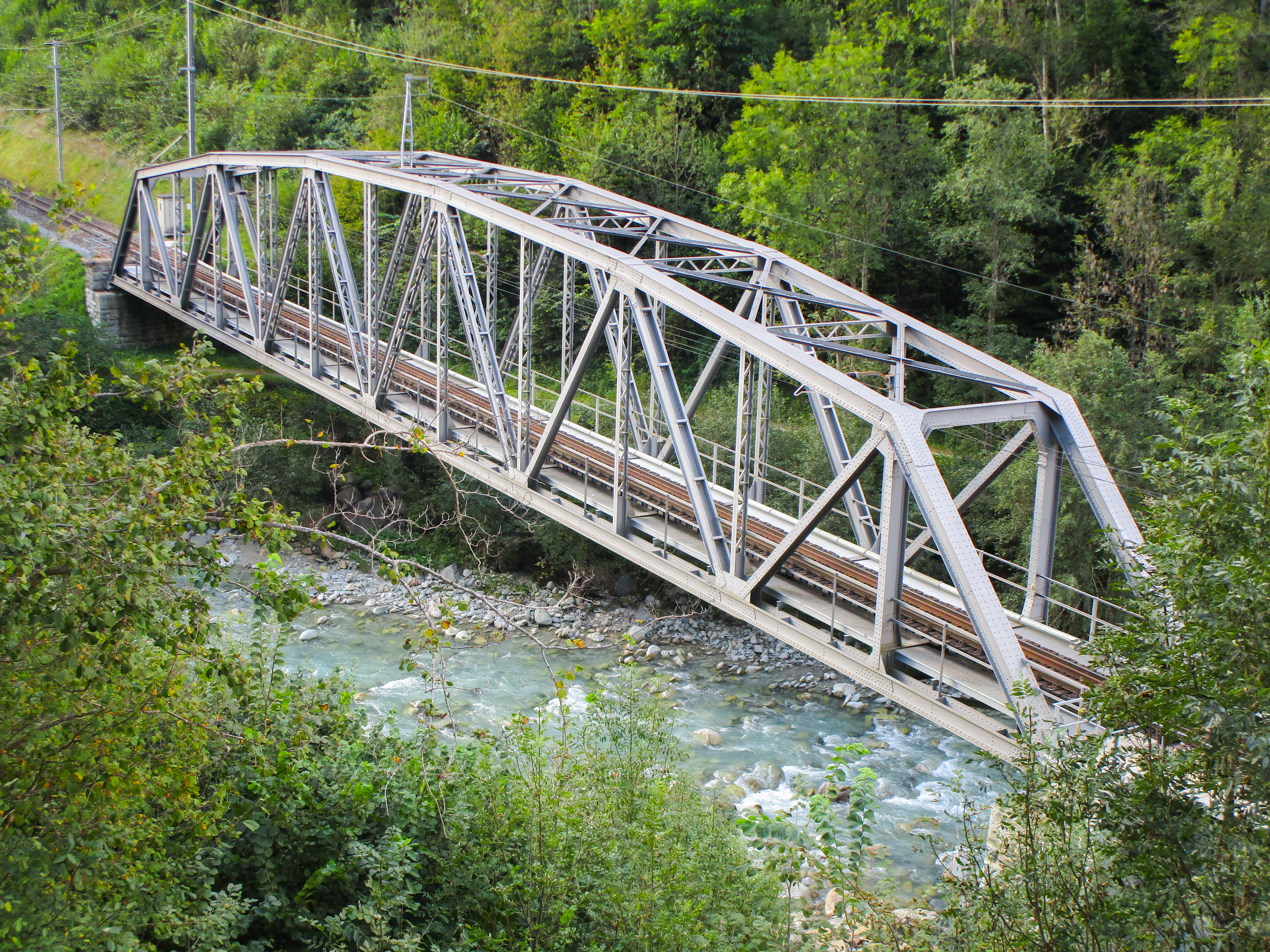
RhB railway bridge over Vorderrhein

- Switzerland. Many Bridges including the following rail bridges
  - *A total of five bridges between Trun and Reichenau-Tamins on the Reichenau-Tamins–Disentis/Mustér railway line (all single tracked, electrified, 1,000 mm (3 ft 3 3/8 in) gauge)

=== Hinterrhein ===
- Switzerland. Many Bridges including the following rail bridges
  - *Between Thusis and Tiefencastel on the Albula railway line (single tracked, electrified, 1,000 mm (3 ft 3 3/8 in) gauge)
  - *Between Trin and Reichenau-Tamins on the Reichenau-Tamins–Disentis/Mustér railway (single tracked, electrified, 1,000 mm (3 ft 3 3/8 in) gauge)

=== Alpine Rhine ===
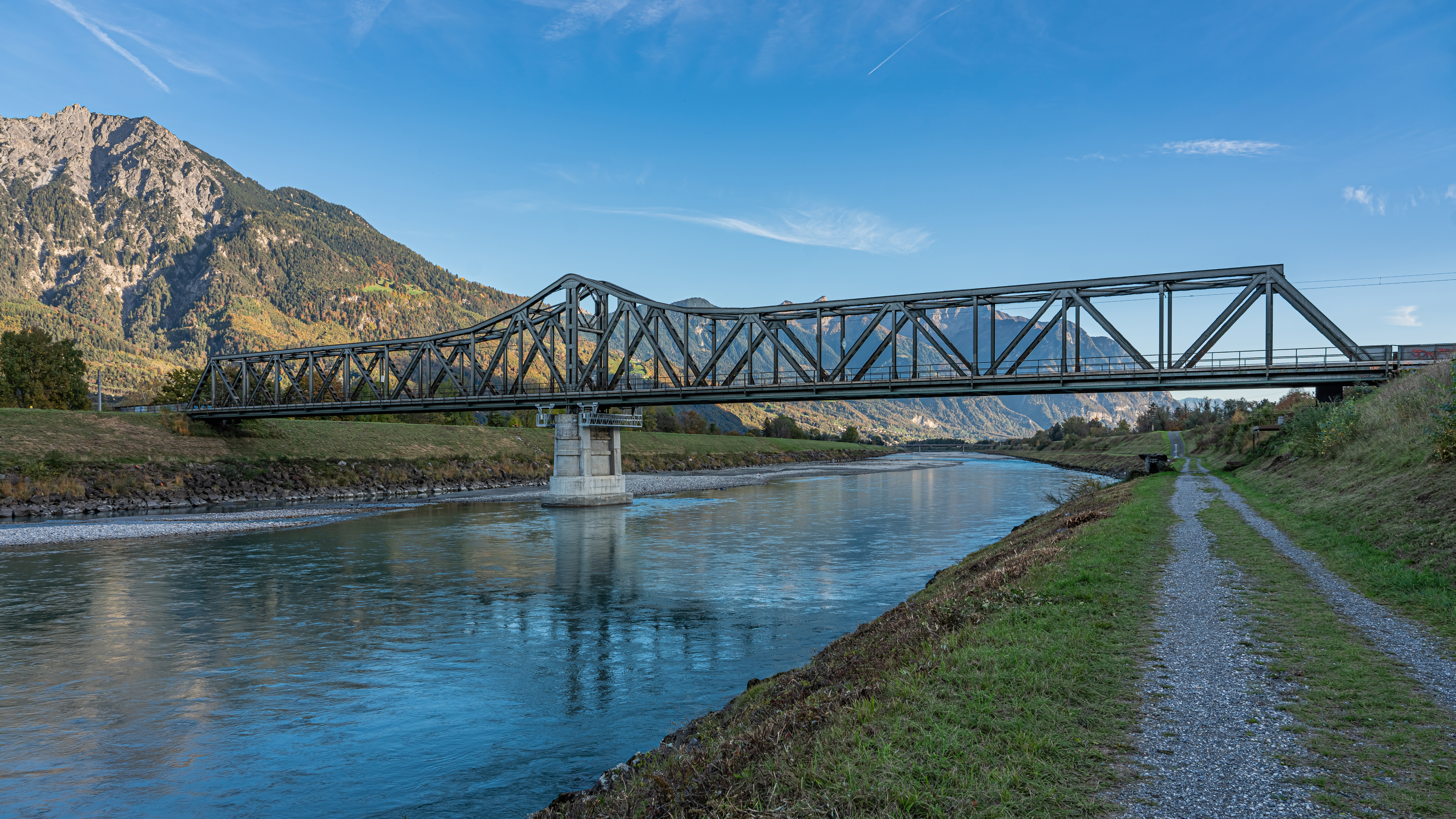
Railway bridge between Liechtenstein and Switzerland

- Switzerland
  - Tamins
    - Emser Bridge
    - Reichenau Bridge
    - Gas Pipeline Tamins
  - Domat/Ems
    - Reichenau Hydroelectric Plant
    - Felsberger Bridge
  - Chur
    - Waffenplatzstrasse Bridge (Chur military base)
    - Mabey-Johnson Bridge (Chur military base)
    - Pardisla Bridge (Pedestrian)
    - Haldenstein Bridge
    - Untervaz Bridge (Pedestrian)
    - *At Untervaz (industrial branch line, single tracked and non-electrified, combined 1005 mm and 1,435 mm (4 ft 8 1/2 in) gauge)
  - Landquart
    - Pedestrian/Pipeline bridge
    - Tardis Bridge
  - Bad Ragaz
    - Maienfeld Bridge
    - *Between Bad Ragaz and Maienfeld (double tracked, electrified, 1,435 mm (4 ft 8 1/2 in) gauge)
    - Pedestrian/Pipeline bridge (private)
    - Bad Ragaz Bridge A13
    - Fläsch Bridge
- Liechtenstein and Switzerland
  - Wartau
    - Trübbach–Mäls Bridge (Pedestrian/Pipeline)
    - Trübbach–Balzers Bridge
  - Vaduz
    - Sri Chinmoy Peace Bridge
    - Vaduz Old Bridge (Pedestrian)
    - Buchs–Vaduz Bridge (Pedestrian)
    - *Between Schaan and Buchs SG (single tracked, electrified)
    - Buchs–Schaan Bridge
    - VfA Energy Bridge (Pipes/Pedestrian)
  - Ruggell
    - Haag–Bendern Bridge
    - Sennwald–Ruggell Bridge
- Austria and Switzerland
  - Hohenems
    - Lienz–Bangs Bridge
    - Oberriet–Meiningen Bridge
    - Montlingen–Koblach Bridge
    - *A total of two bridges of the Internationale Rheinregulierungsbahn (both single tracked, electrified, 750 mm (2 ft 5 1/2 in) gauge, the southern bridge was dismantled in 2020)
  - Lustenau
    - Habsburg Bridge (1914)
    - Pedestrian Bridge (planned)
    - Lustenau Bridge
    - *Between Lustenau and St. Margrethen (single tracked, electrified)

==== Fussacher Durchstich ====
- Main course follows an artificial channel in Austria
  - Brugger Straße Bridge
  - Fussach–Hard Bridge

==== Alter Rhein ====
- Original course forms the border between Austria and Switzerland
  - Between Höchst and St. Margrethen
  - A total of two bridges between Gaißau and Rheineck

=== Seerhein ===
- Germany
  - *Old Rhine Bridge between Konstanz and Konstanz-Petershausen (combined road and single tracked, electrified railway)
  - Bicycle bridge in Konstanz (bicycle and pedestrian)
  - Schänzlebrücke in Konstanz (Bundesstraße 33)

=== High Rhine ===
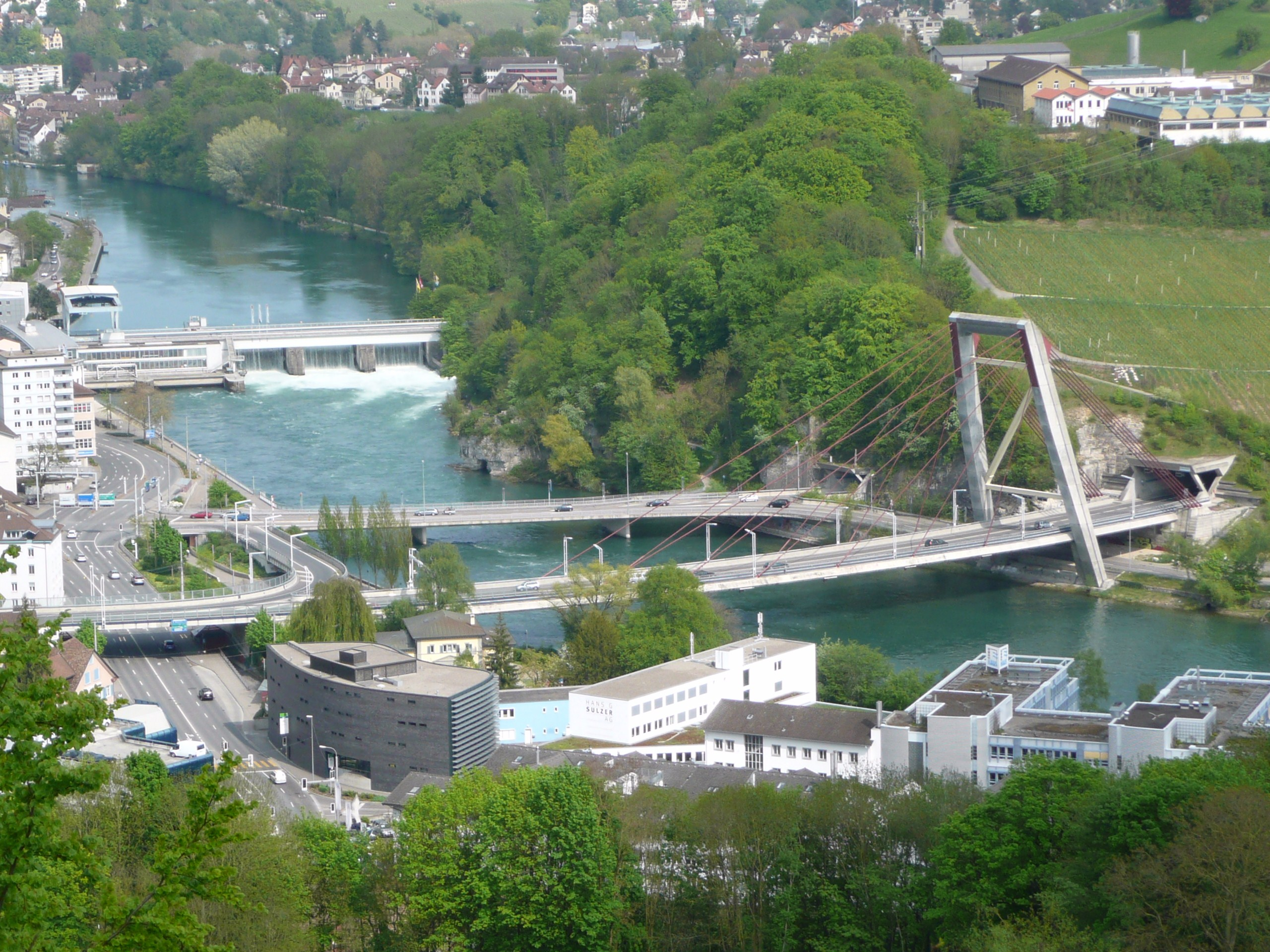
Hydroelectric powerplant, Schaffhausen-Flurlingen road bridge and N4 motorway bridge

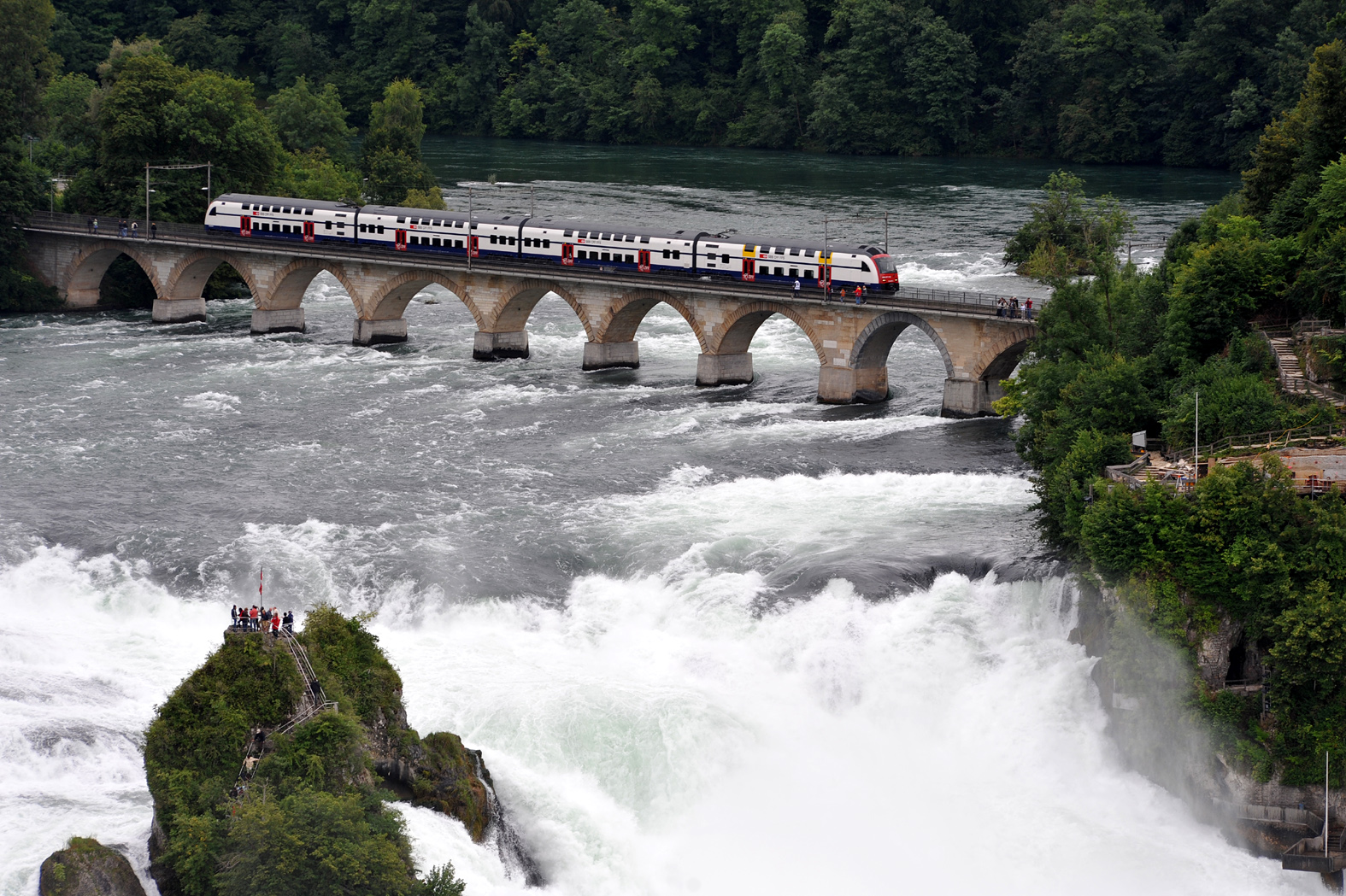
The Rheinfall rail bridge, just upstream of the Rhine Falls near Schaffhausen

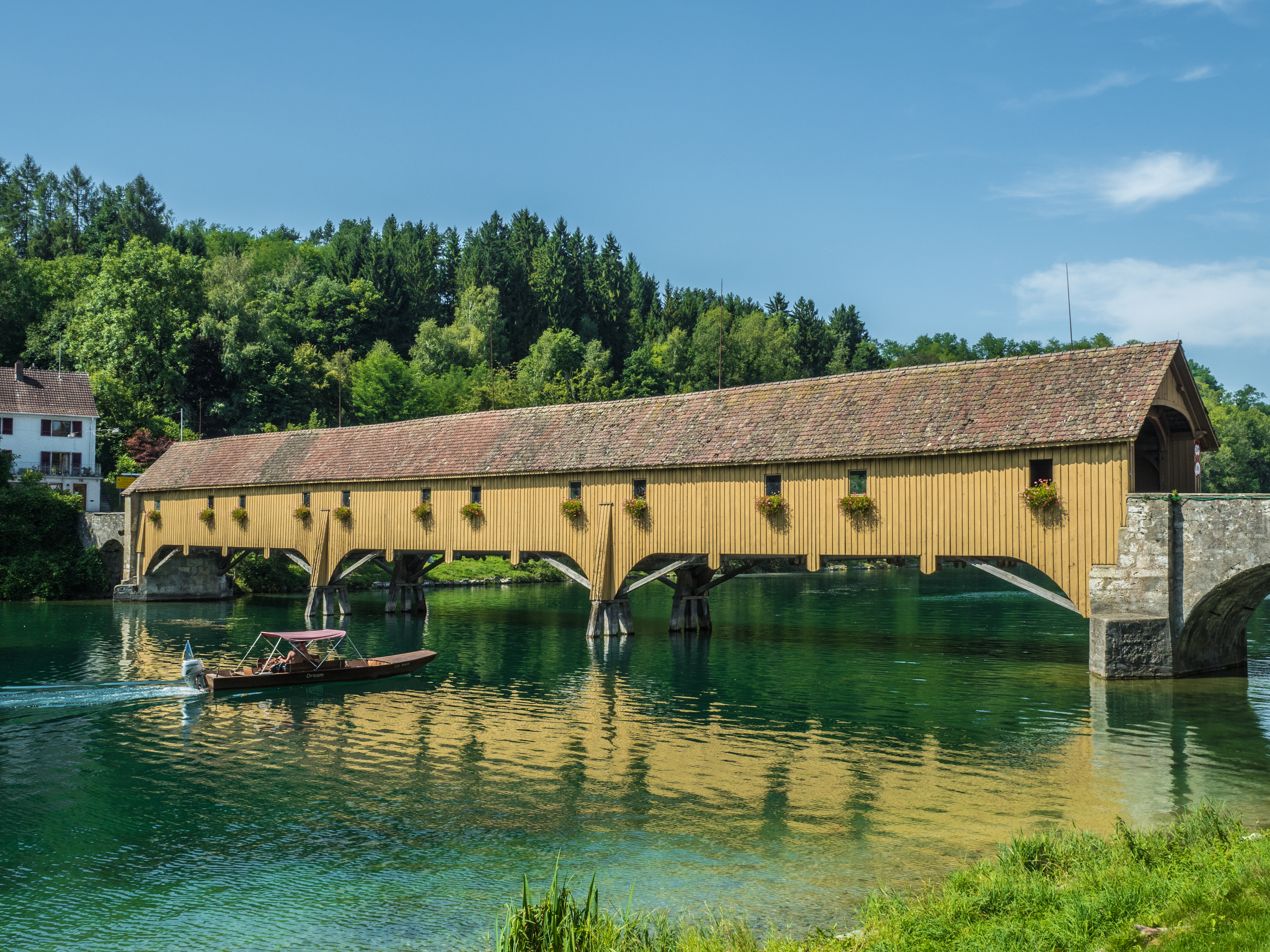
Wooden bridge in Rheinau

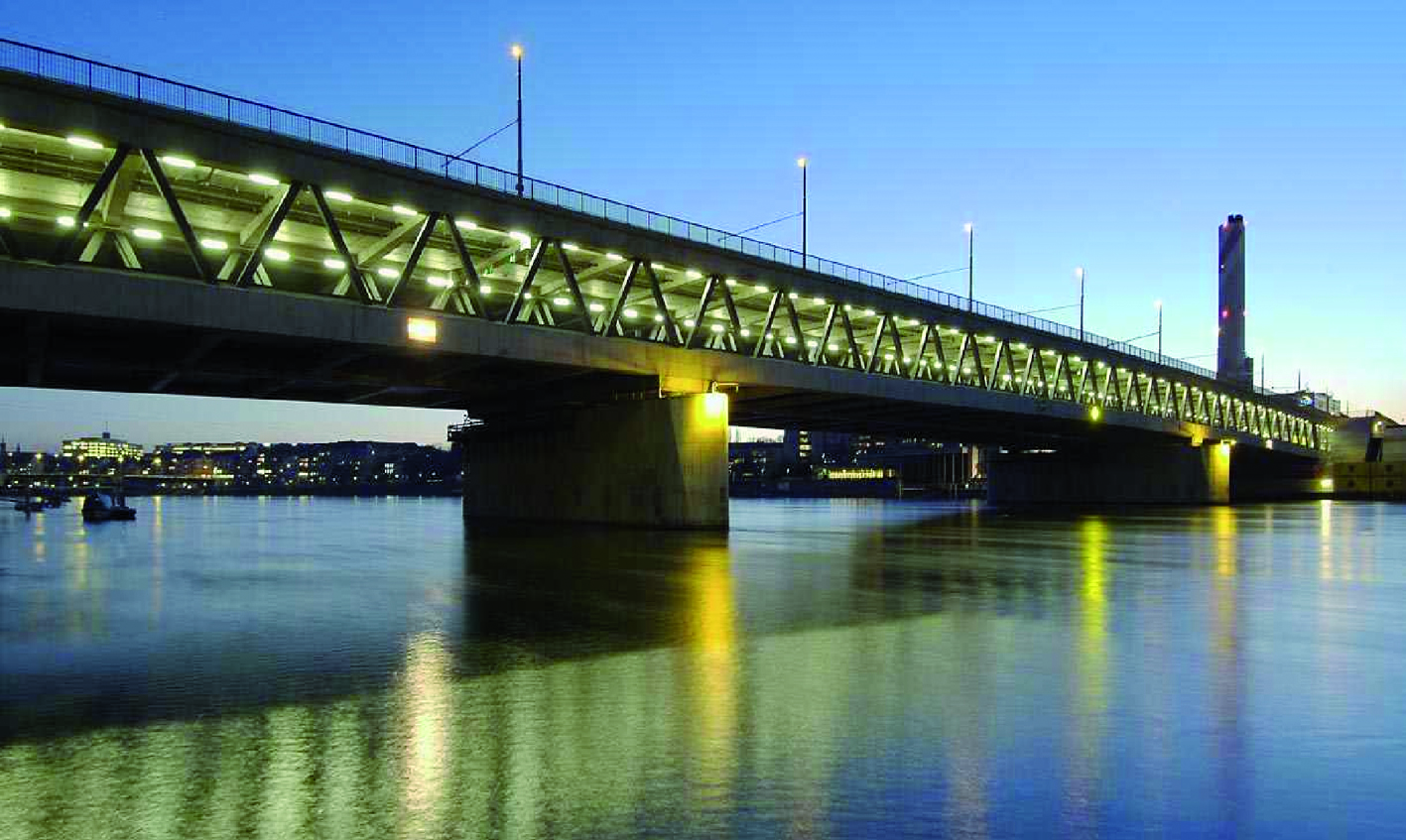
Two-leveled Dreirosenbrücke in Basel

- Switzerland
  - Stein am Rhein bridge in Stein am Rhein
  - Hemishofen road bridge between Etzwilen and Hemishofen
  - *Hemishofen railway bridge between Etzwilen and Hemishofen (single tracked, not electrified, line is a heritage railway since 2007)
- Switzerland and Germany
  - Diessenhofen–Gailingen bridge (Rheinbrücke Diessenhofen–Gailingen) between Diessenhofen and Gailingen (wooden, completed in 1816)
- Switzerland
  - *Feuerthalen railway bridge between Feuerthalen and Schaffhausen (single tracked, electrified)
  - Feuerthalen road bridge between Feuerthalen and Schaffhausen
  - Schaffhausen–Flurlingen road bridge, between Schaffhausen and Flurlingen
  - N4 motorway bridge, between Schaffhausen and Flurlingen (cable-stayed bridge, one tower)
  - Neuhausen–Flurlingen road bridge, between Neuhausen am Rheinfall and Flurlingen
  - *Rheinfall railway bridge, between Schloss Laufen am Rheinfall and Neuhausen stations (single tracked, electrified, with pedestrian walkways)
  - Nohl bridge, between Neuhausen am Rheinfall and Dachsen (for pedestrian and cyclists)
- Switzerland and Germany
  - Rheinau–Altenburg road bridge, between Rheinau and Altenburg (wooden, completed in 1806)
- Switzerland
  - Rüdlingen road bridge, between Flaach and Rüdlingen
  - Eglisau road bridge in Eglisau
  - *Eglisau railway bridge between Eglisau and Hüntwangen-Wil stations (single tracked, electrified)
- Switzerland and Germany
  - Kaiserstuhl–Hohentengen road bridge, between Kaiserstuhl, and Hohentengen
  - *Waldshut–Koblenz Rhine Bridge between Koblenz and Waldshut (single tracked, electrified)
  - Koblenz–Waldshut road bridge, between Koblenz and Waldshut-Tiengen
  - High Rhine road bridge, between Laufenburg (Aargau) and Laufenburg, Germany
  - Laufen road bridge, between Laufenburg (Aargau) and Laufenburg, Germany
  - Holzbrücke Bad Säckingen, between Stein and Bad Säckingen (wooden, opened in 1272)
  - Fridolins road bridge, between Stein (Aargau) and Bad Säckingen
  - Old Rhine bridge of Rheinfelden, between Rheinfelden (Aargau) and Rheinfelden (Baden)
  - Rheinfelden road bridge, between Rheinfelden (Aargau) and Rheinfelden (Baden)
- Switzerland
  - *Between Basel SBB and Basel Badischer Bahnhof on the Basel Connecting Line (two separate bridges, four tracks, electrified)
  - Schwarzwald road bridge in Basel
  - Wettstein road bridge in Basel
  - Middle Bridge, Basel (stone, opened in 1223)
  - Johanniter road bridge in Basel
  - #Dreirosenbrücke in Basel (two-leveled, road and tramway on top, motorway below)

=== Upper Rhine ===
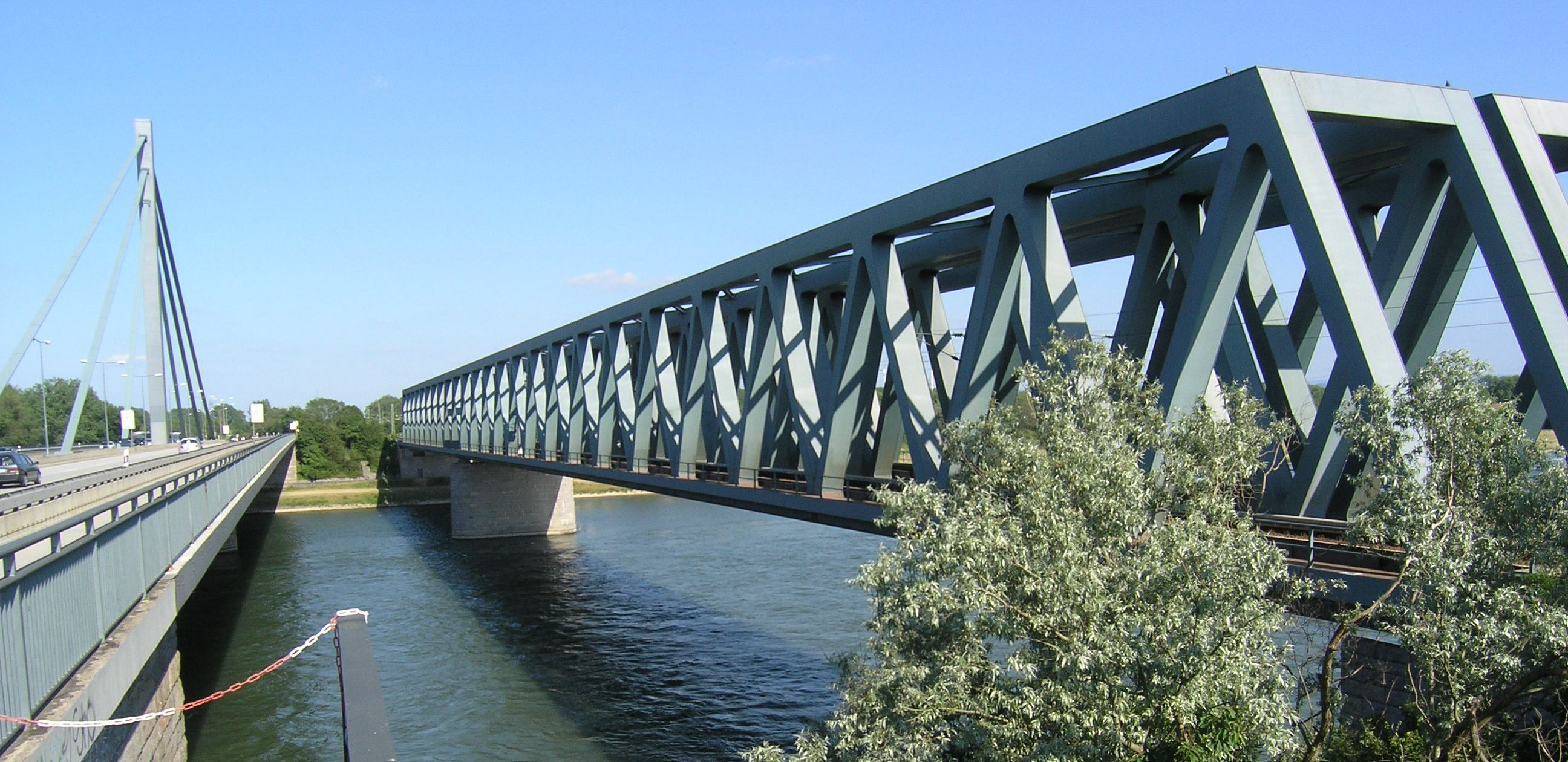
Maxau–Maximiliansau

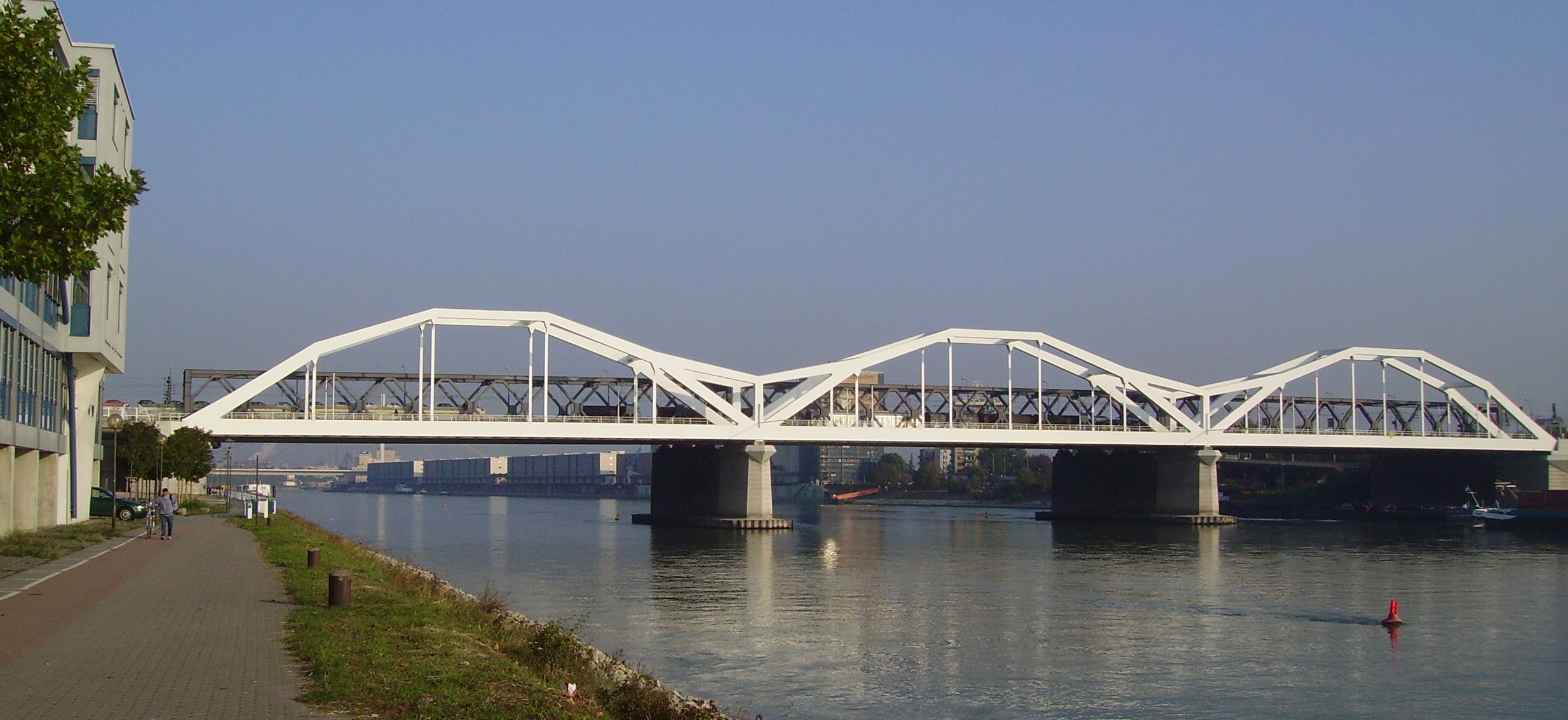
Konrad Adenauer Bridge between Ludwigshafen and Mannheim

- France and Germany
  - Weil
    - Three Country Bridge Footbridge
    - *Between Huningue and Weil am Rhein (single tracked, destroyed in World War II)
    - Palmrain Bridge
  - Kembs Weir (and locks on Alsace Canal)
  - Neuenburg
    - Ottmarsheim Bridge A36
    - *Between Chalampé and Neuenburg (single tracked, electrified, freight only — passenger service only on weekends)
    - Neuenburg Bridge
  - Alain-Foechterlé-Erich-Dilger Bridge Fessenheim_Nuclear_Power_Plant
  - Breisach
    - *Between Neuf-Brisach and Breisach (single tracked, destroyed in World War II)
    - Breisach Bridge
  - Sasbach–Marckolsheim Bridge Power Station and locks.
  - Strasbourg
    - Pierre Pflimlin Bridge
    - Strasbourg Weir (Power Station and locks on canal)
    - Passerelle des Deux Rives Footbridge of two (politically separate) riverbanks
    - Europa Bridge
    - Kehl Tram Bridge
    - *Between Strasbourg and Kehl (double tracked from December 2010 for the first time since 1944, electrified: single tracked 1956–2010.)
  - Staustufe Rheinau Gambsheim Road over weir and locks
  - Iffezheim Road over weir and locks
  - *Between Rœschwoog and Rastatt-Wintersdorf (double tracked, used as street bridge since 1949, line closed 1960, rails were preserved for strategic purpose until 1999). Now a road bridge.
- Germany
  - Karlsruhe
    - *Maxau Rhine Bridge between Karlsruhe-Maxau and Wörth am Rhein-Maximiliansau (double tracked, electrified)
    - Maxau Bridge
  - Germersheim
    - *Germersheim Rhine Bridge between Germersheim and Philippsburg (single tracked, electrified)
    - Rudolf von Habsburg Bridge
  - Speyer
    - Salier Bridge
    - Speyer Bridge A61
  - Mannheim
    - *Konrad Adenauer Bridge between Ludwigshafen and Mannheim (four tracks, electrified; also road bridge with tram line)
    - Kurt Schumacher Bridge
    - Theodor Heuss Bridge A6
  - Worms
    - Nibelung Bridge
    - *Rhine Bridge between Worms-Brücke and Hofheim (double tracked, electrified)
  - Mainz
    - Weisenauer Bridge A60
    - *Südbrücke, Mainz, between Mainz-Süd and Mainz-Gustavsburg (double tracked, electrified)
    - Theodor Heuss Bridge
    - *Kaiser Bridge between Mainz-Nord and Wiesbaden-Ost (double tracked, electrified)
    - Schierstein Bridge A643

=== Middle Rhine ===
- Germany
  - Koblenz
    - *Hindenburg Bridge between Rüdesheim/Geisenheim and Münster-Sarmsheim/Ockenheim (double tracked, destroyed in World War II)
    - Koblenz South Bridge
    - *Horchheim rail bridge between Koblenz Hbf and Niederlahnstein on Lahntal railway (double tracked, electrified)
    - Pfaffendorf Bridge
    - Koblenz Cable Car
    - Bendorf Bridge, A48, Koblenz.
    - *Urmitz Bridge between Koblenz-Lützel and Neuwied on Neuwied–Koblenz line (double tracked, electrified)
    - Raiffeisen Bridge Neuwied.
    - Caesar's first and second Rhine bridges, probably near Neuwied, built in n 55 BC and 53 BC
    - *Ludendorff Bridge between Sinzig/Bad Bodendorf and Unkel (double tracked, destroyed in World War II)
  - Bonn
    - Konrad-Adenauer Bridge
    - Kennedy Bridge
    - Friedrich-Ebert Bridge

=== Lower Rhine ===
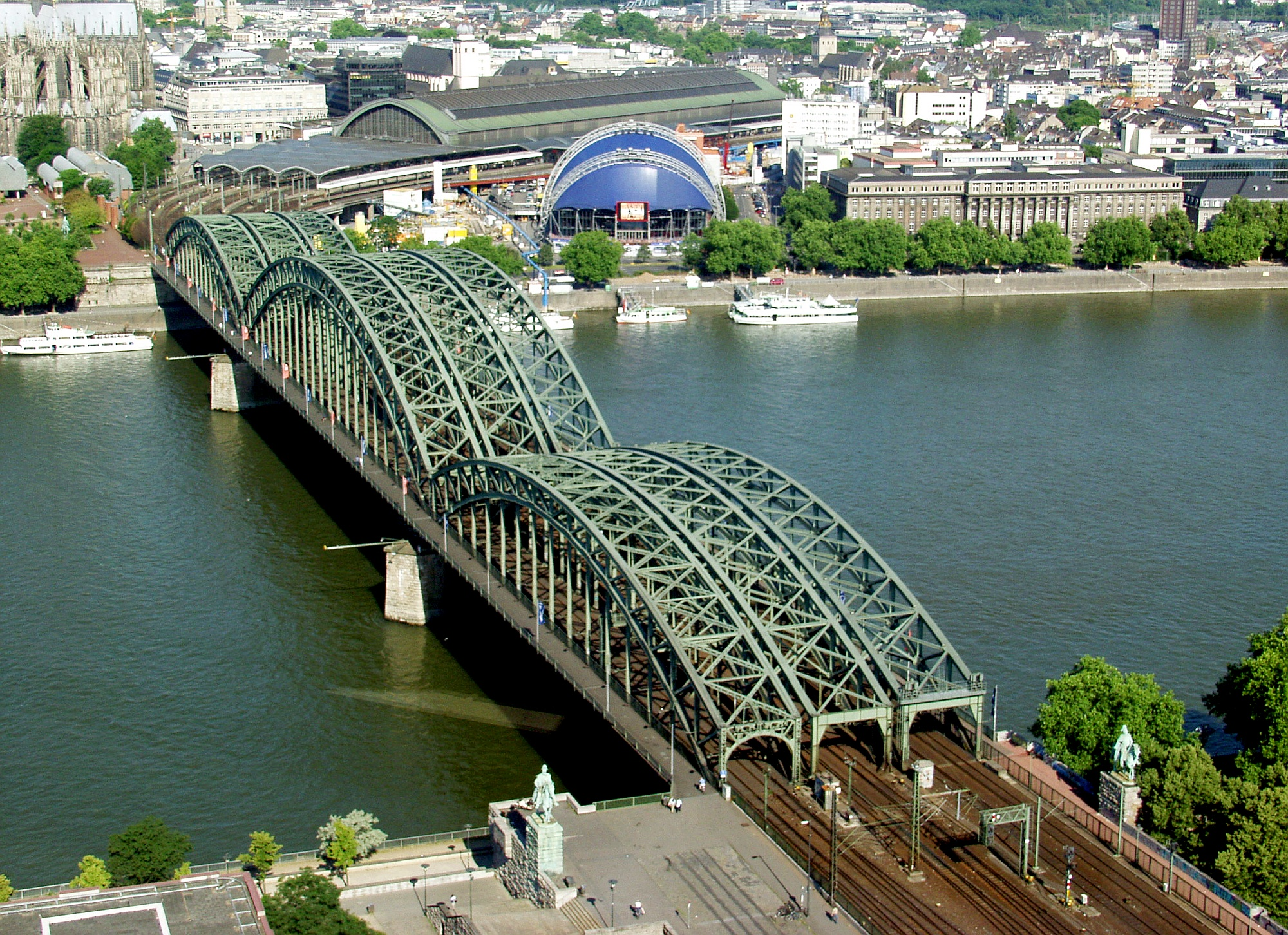
The Hohenzollernbrücke in Cologne

- Germany
  - Cologne
    - Rodenkirchen Bridge
    - *South Bridge south of the City (double tracked, electrified)
    - Severins Bridge, Cologne (Road and Tram)
    - Deutz Bridge, Cologne (Road and Tram)
    - *Cathedral Bridge Dismantled 1909
    - *Hohenzollernbrücke, between Köln Hauptbahnhof and Köln Messe/Deutz railway station (six tracks, electrified)
    - Zoo Bridge, (Cologne Zoo)
    - Mülheim Bridge
    - Leverkusen Bridge
  - Düsseldorf
    - Flehe Bridge
    - Cardinal Josef Frings Bridge
    - *Hamm Railway Bridge, between Neuss-Rheinpark Center and Düsseldorf-Hamm (four tracks, electrified)
    - Knee of Rhine Bridge
    - Oberkasseler Bridge(Road and Tram)
    - Theodor Heuss Bridge
    - Airport Bridge A44
  - Duisburg
    - Krefeld Bridge
    - *Duisburg-Hochfeld Railway Bridge, between Rheinhausen-Ost and Duisburg-Hochfeld Süd (double tracked, electrified)
    - Solidarity Bridge
    - Neuenkamp Bridge
    - Friedrich Ebert Bridge A40
    - *Haus-Knipp railway bridge between Moers and Duisburg-Beeck (double tracked, electrified, freight only)
    - Beeckerwerth Bridge
  - Wesel Bridge
  - *Wesel Railway Bridge between Büderich and Wesel (double tracked, destroyed in World War II)
  - Rees Bridge Rees
  - Emmerich Bridge Emmerich

=== Rhine delta ===
- Netherlands (in the delta, the river splits and its name changes between places)

==== Main Channel to Rotterdam ====
- Nijmegen
  - Waal Bridge
  - Snel Bridge
  - *Nijmegen railway bridge between Nijmegen and Nijmegen Lent, across the Waal River (Rhine delta, main branch) - (double tracked, electrified)
  - Oversteek (The Crossing)
  - Tacitus Bridge A50
  - Prince Willem Alexander Bridge
- Zaltbommel
  - *Dr Hupkes Bridge between Zaltbommel and Geldermalsen across the Waal River, made famous in a poem by Martinus Nijhoff - (double tracked, electrified)
  - Martinus Nijhoff Bridge A2
- Rotterdam
  - Merwede Bridge A27
  - *Baanhoek Bridge at Sliedrecht, across Beneden Merwede - (single track)
  - Merwede Bridge Papendrecht
  - Bridge over the Noord (River name at this point)
  - Brienenoord Bridge A16
  - Willems Bridge
  - *At Rotterdam, across Nieuwe Maas (joint Rhine-Meuse River mouth), former bridge; now replaced by a tunnel (four tracks, electrified).
  - *At Rotterdam, across Nieuwe Maas-Koningshaven, former bridge 'De Hef' — replaced by a tunnel, disfunct, industrial monument (two tracks, electrified)
  - Erasmus Bridge Road and Tram
  - Maastunnel
  - Benelux tunnel A4
  - Blankenburgverbinding A24 (tunnel under construction)

==== Rail Bridges on other channels ====
  - *Between Rotterdam and Dordrecht, across Oude Maas, two bridges - (each double tracked, electrified)
  - *South of Rotterdam, 'HSL' tunnel below Oude Maas - (double tracked, electrified)
  - *South of Rotterdam, main bridge at Moerdijk across Hollands Diep - (double tracked, electrified)
  - *South of Rotterdam, 'HSL' second railway bridge - (double tracked, electrified, hi-speed)
  - *Near Alblasserdam, a tunnel below Noord (a branch near Rotterdam) - (two tracks, electrified; freight only: Rotterdam - Ruhr Area link-up 'Betuwelijn', built 2001-2006).
  - *Between Bemmel and Zevenaar, tunnel below Pannerdens Kanaal (1707 AD dug section of Rhine's second-largest delta branch) - (two tracks, electrified; freight only: Rotterdam - Ruhr Area link-up 'Betuwelijn', built 2001-2006)
  - *At Arnhem, across Nederrijn (Rhine delta, second-largest branch) - (two tracks, electrified)
  - *At Rhenen, across Nederrijn - former double tracked rail bridge, destroyed in World War II.
  - *Between Culemborg and Houten, across the Lek River (Rhine delta, second-largest branch farther downstream) - (two tracks, electrified)
  - *At Westervoort, across IJssel - (two tracks, electrified)
  - *At Zutphen, across IJssel (Rhine, third-largest branch) - (two tracks, electrified)
  - *At Deventer, across IJssel - (two tracks, electrified)
  - *At Zwolle, across IJssel, Older bridge - (two tracks, electrified)
  - *At Zwolle, across IJssel, Second bridge 'Hanzelijn' 2010 - (two tracks, electrified)
  - *Between Utrecht and Zeist, across Kromme Rijn (east of Bunnik) - (two tracks, electrified)
  - *At Utrecht Centraal, across Vaartsche Rijn (canal) - (four tracks, electrified; building a second bridge with four more tracks is scheduled for 2011–2012)
  - *At Utrecht Centraal, across Oude Rijn (canalised into Leidschse Rijn) (fifteen tracks + platforms; electrified).
  - *Between Utrecht and Vleuten, Woerden, across Amsterdam Rijn-Canal - (four tracks, electrified)
  - *Between Utrecht and Breukelen, Amsterdam, across Amsterdam Rijn-Canal - (four tracks, electrified)
  - *At Leiden Centraal, across Oude Rijn, towards Utrecht - (two tracks, electrified)
  - *At Leiden, across Oude Rijn, towards Rotterdam - (four tracks, electrified)

== Strategic bridges ==
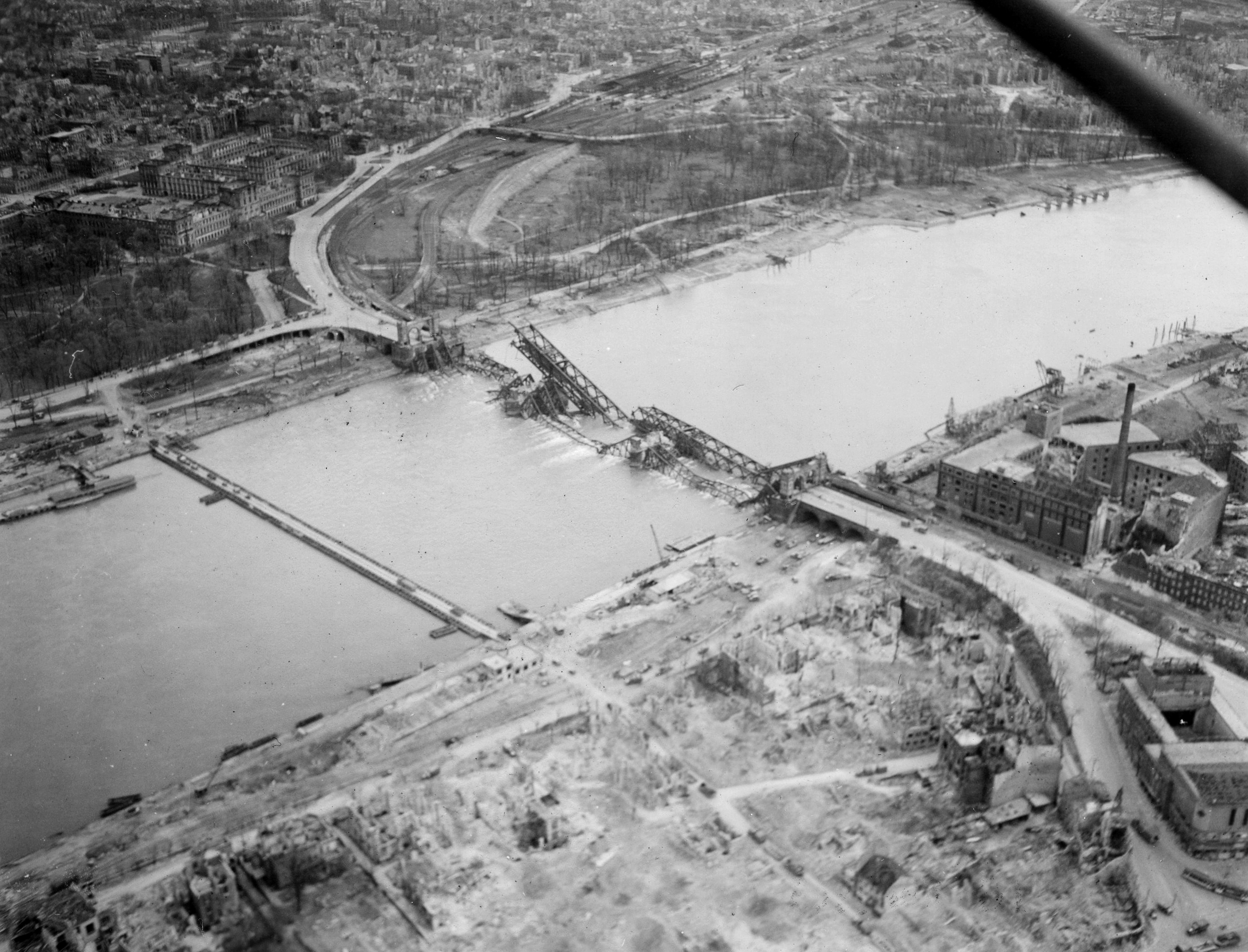
Mannheim-Ludwigshafen bridge in 1945

The bridges at Huningue, Rastatt, Rüdesheim (Hindenburgbrücke) and Remagen (Ludendorffbrücke), were built for strategic military reasons only, in order to allow the Imperial German Army and later on, the Wehrmacht, to quickly transport forces by rail to Germany's western border in the event of a war with France. Unlike other bridges built for the same purpose, such as the ones at Koblenz or Cologne, these bridges were of almost no use in peacetime and thus, were never rebuilt, after their destruction during the last months of World War II, except for the one at Rastatt, which was used to supply units of the French Army stationed in the area.
