= Gyttja =

Type of fine-grained sedimentary mud

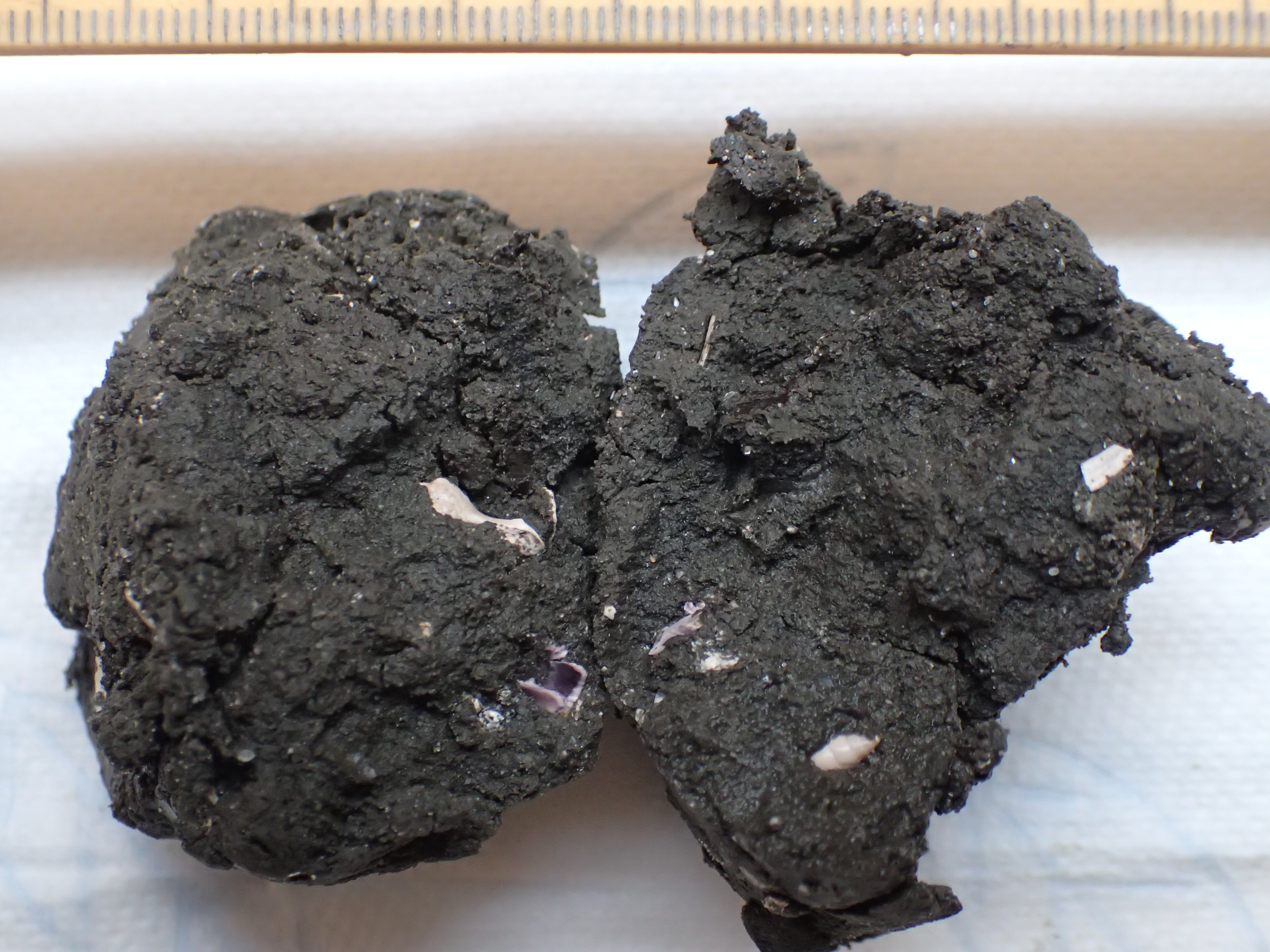

Gyttja (sometimes gytta, from Swedish gyttja) is a mud formed from the partial decay of peat. It is black and has a gel-like consistency. Aerobic digestion of the peat by bacteria forms humic acid and reduces the peat in the first oxygenated metre (generally 0.5 metre) of the peat column. As the peat is buried under new peat or soil the oxygen is reduced, often by waterlogging, and further degradation by anaerobic microbes, anaerobic digestion can produce gyttja. The gyttja then slowly drains to the bottom of the column. It pools at the bottom of the peat column, about 10 metres (33 ft) below the surface or wherever it is stopped by e.g. compacted soil/peat, bedrock, or permafrost. Gyttja accumulates as long as new material is added to the top of the column and the conditions are right for anaerobic degradation of the peat. Gyttja can form in layers reflecting changes in the environment as with other sedimentary rock. Gyttja is the part of peat that forms coal, but it must be buried under thousands of meters for coalification to occur because it has to be hot enough to drive off the water it contains (see dopplerite). A good documented example of gyttja occurrence and its coverage change in time is the cultural heritage site in Puck Bay, Poland.
