= Carl Joseph Schröter =

Swiss botanist

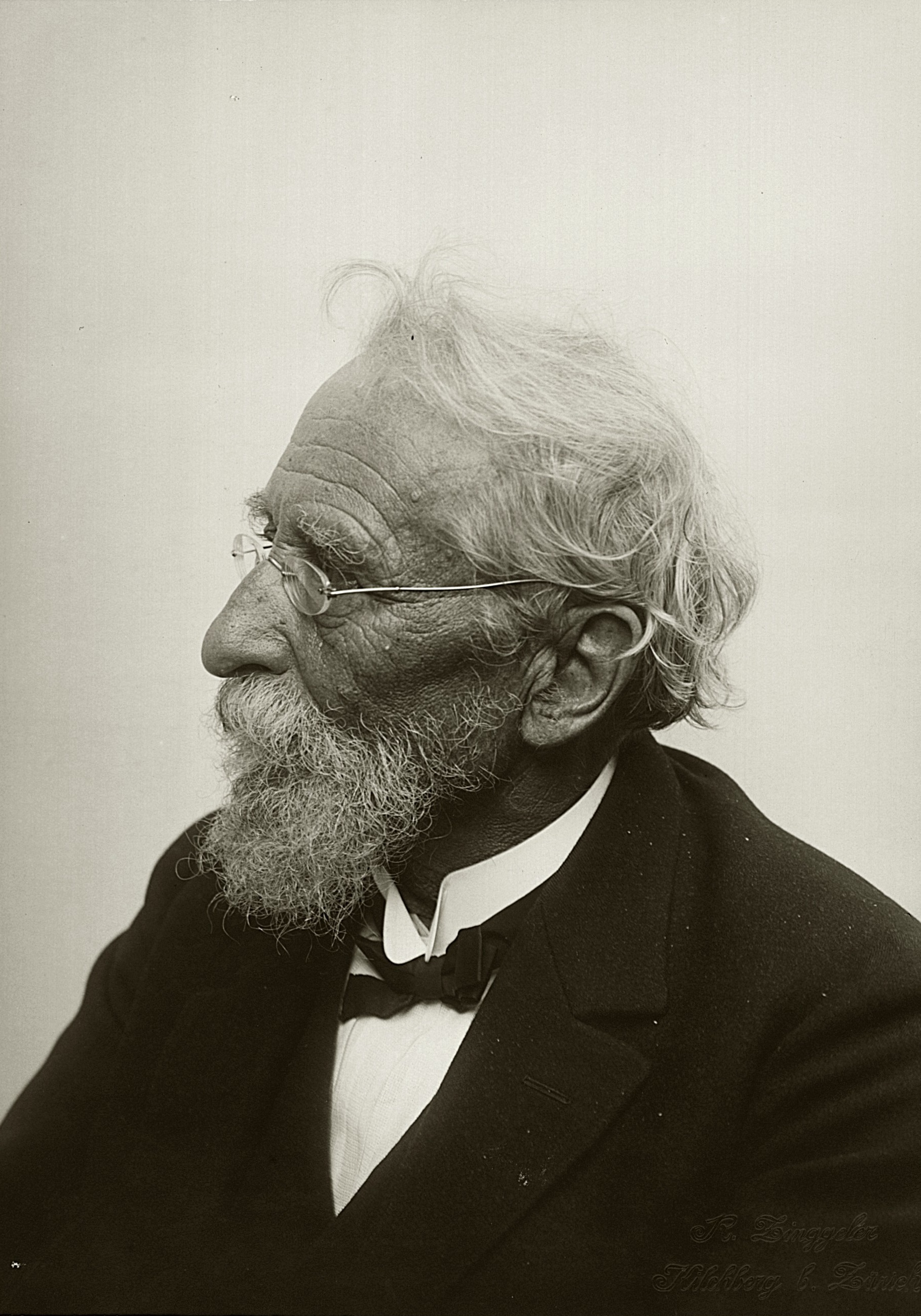
Carl Joseph Schröter, c. 1920

Carl Joseph Schröter (19 December 1855 – 7 February 1939) was a Swiss botanist born in Esslingen am Neckar, Germany.

From 1874 he studied natural sciences at Eidgenössische Polytechnische Schule (ETH Zurich), where one of his early influences was geologist Albert Heim (1849–1937). Following his habilitation in 1878, he worked as an assistant to Carl Eduard Cramer (1831–1901). In 1883 he succeeded Oswald Heer (1809–1883) as professor of botany at ETH Zurich, a position he kept until 1926.

Schröter was a pioneer in the fields of phytogeography and phytosociology. He introduced the concept of "autecology" to explain the relationship of an individual plant with its external environment, and "synecology" to express relationships between plant communities and external influences.

In 1910 with Charles Flahault (1852–1935), he released Rapport sur la nomenclature phytogéographique (Reports on phytogeographical nomenclature), and with Friedrich Gottlieb Stebler (1852-1935), he was co-author of Die besten Futterpflanzen, etc. (1883–1884), a work involving forage crop cultivation and economics. It was later translated into English, and published with the title, "The best forage plants: fully described and figured with a complete account of their cultivation, economic value, impurities and adulterants, &c" (1889). With Stebler he issued the exsiccata series Schweizerische Gräser-Sammlung from 1888 to 1892. With geographer Johann Jakob Früh, he was co-author of a book on Swiss moorlands, titled Die Moore der Schweiz : mit Berücksichtigung der gesamten Moorfrage (1904).
