= Duisburg-Hochfeld Railway Bridge =

Railway bridge in Germany

Duisburg–Hochfeld railway bridge
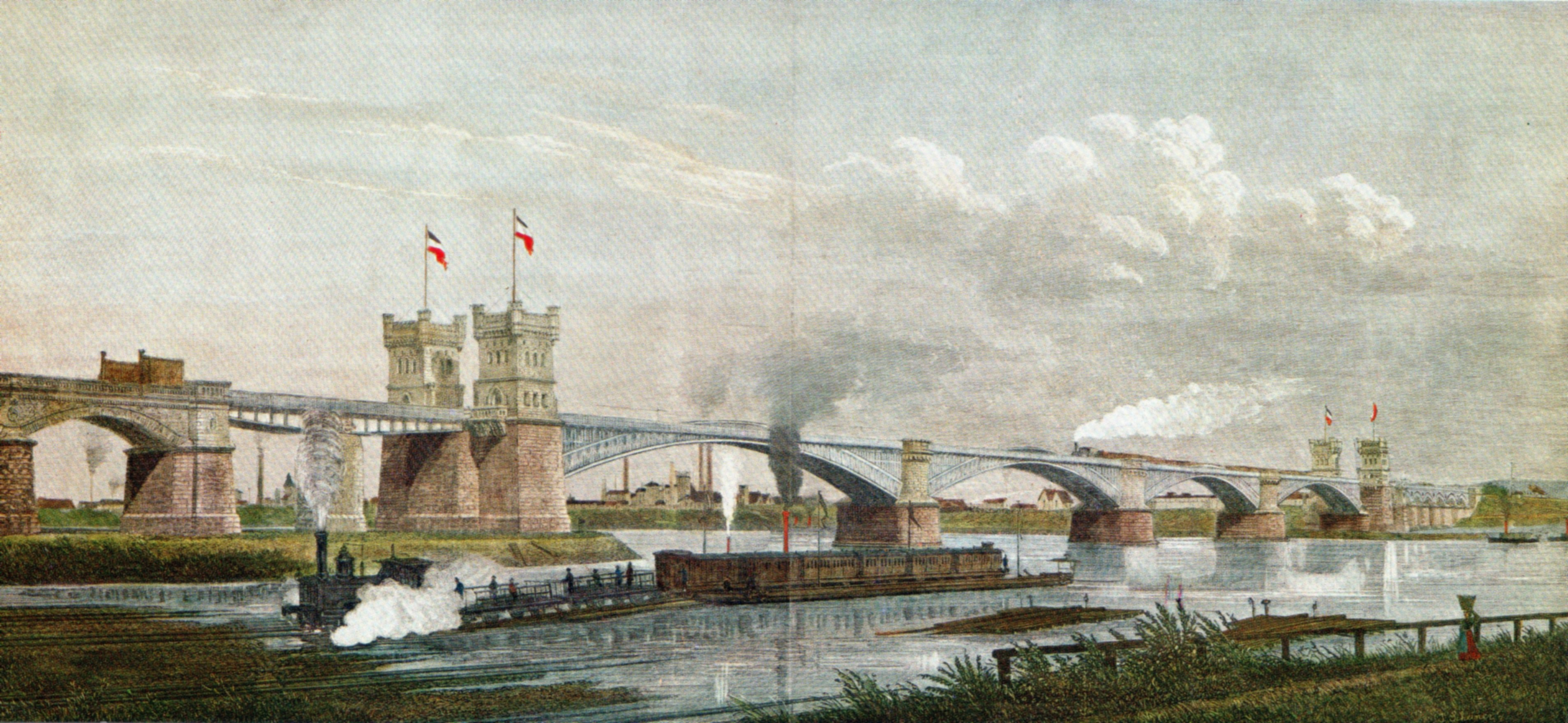
- Train ferry with carriages is in the foreground. Behind is the new railway bridge with a freight train in early January 1874. Behind the bridge are factories in Hochfeld.
- Coordinates: 51°24′28″N 6°44′41″E
- Carries: Trains
- Crosses: Rhine
- Locale: Duisburg, North Rhine-Westphalia, Germany
- Official name: Duisburg-Hochfelder Eisenbahnbrücke

Characteristics
- Design: Truss bridge
- Width: 2 tracks
- Longest span: 189 m (620 ft)

History
- Construction start: 1872, 1926, 1948
- Construction end: 1873, 1927, 1949
- Opened: 1873, 1927, 1949

Location
- Interactive map of Duisburg–Hochfeld railway bridge

The Duisburg–Hochfeld railway bridge (German: Duisburg-Hochfelder Eisenbahnbrücke) spans the Rhine in the German city of Duisburg on the Duisburg-Ruhrort–Mönchengladbach line. The first bridge was built by the Rhenish Railway Company and put into operation at the end of 1873. It was replaced by a new bridge in 1927, which was badly damaged during the Second World War, but rebuilt and is still serves rail traffic between the Ruhr region and Aachen.

== History ==
On 23 August 1866, the Rhenish Railway Company (Rheinische Eisenbahn-Gesellschaft, RhE) opened its line between Osterrath and Essen to connect the coal mines in the Ruhr region with its railway network, which at that time was mainly located on the west bank of the Rhine. This line included the Rheinhausen–Hochfeld train ferry. Prior to the Austro-Prussian War, the Prussian military opposed the building of fixed bridges across the Rhine for military reasons, except in fortified cities such as Cologne, Mainz, Koblenz and Düsseldorf. Hints in 1869 that military opinion had changed led the company to apply immediately for permission to construct a bridge from Rheinhausen to Duisburg.

=== The first bridge ===
The Prussian government issued a concession on 29 July 1871 for the construction of a railway bridge on the Osterrath–Essen line near Rheinhausen on the following conditions:

- Chambers with mines were to be built in all bridge piers,
- Towers were to be constructed with defensive facilities at both bridgeheads and there were to be swing bridges at the end of the main bridge that could be activated during wartime,
- Train ferry facilities on the banks were to be removed,
- 300 thalers was to be paid to the Prussian government for two military gunboats.

Since the Rhenish Railway Company plans for the bridge was largely ready, construction of the double-track bridge was able to begin in 1872. Despite two floods, it was completed in two years. To the west of the Rhine, a 16 span brick approach bridge was built over the flood plain; each span had an internal length of 50 Prussian feet. The central pier of the swing bridge was about 34 metres long and 10 metres wide. In the event of an attack it could be turned 90° and thus made impassable for troops and trains. At the ends of the bridge there were defensive towers, which had pedestrian walkways on each side. The main bridge consisted of four spans, each 98 metres long, which were supported by three piers. Each span consisted of a two-hinged arch truss made of 2,800 tons of wrought iron made by Jacobi, Haniel and Huyssen (later GHH) in Oberhausen. On the eastern side of the Rhine the bridge's defensive tower connected with a swing bridge and a shorter bridge over the flood plain with 6 spans, which were 50 Prussian feet long. The bridge had an overall length of 800 metres.

Freight operations on the bridge commenced on 24 December 1873. The passenger trains still used the train ferry until 14 January 1874. All four lines of the ferry could then be demolished. The construction costs for the Rhenish Railway were about 2.5 million thalers.

The ever-increasing rail traffic across the bridge and the increasingly heavy trains were already starting to damage the bridge by 1910 and at the beginning of 1914 the first plans for a new bridge were being drafted, but were dropped because of the First World War.

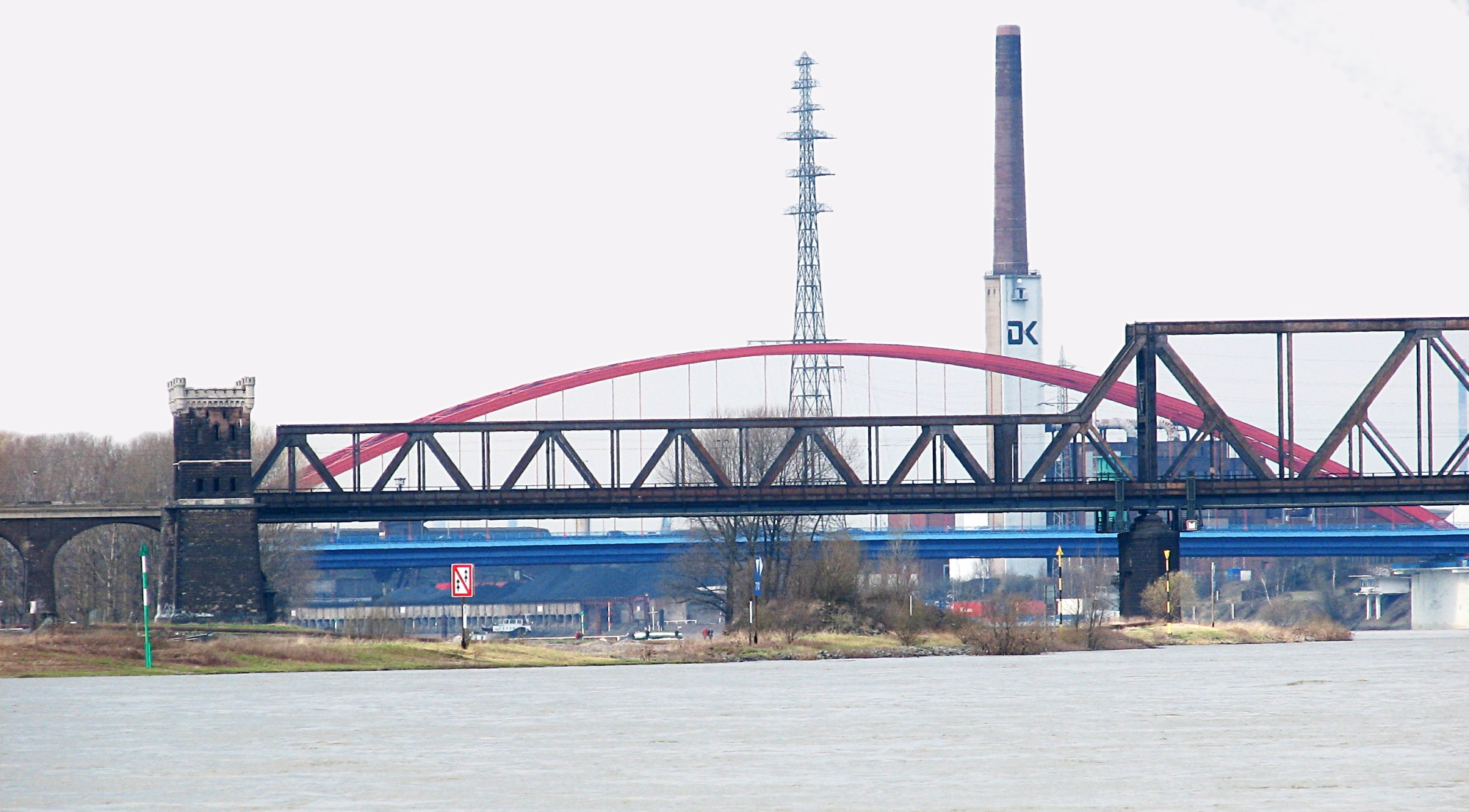
Western section of the bridge with old bridge head

==== Bombing ====
On 30 June 1923, during the occupation of the Ruhr a time bomb exploded while a Belgian military train was crossing the bridge. Eight people died and several were injured.

=== The second bridge ===
The construction of the second bridge began in 1925 and it was commissioned on 13 October 1927. It was built only a few metres downstream of the first bridge. This was demolished as far as the left-bank bridge pylon in order to remove impediments to shipping and the discharge of floods.

The new bridge had a clearance for navigation that was nearly 180 metres wide. The main bridge was 20 metres high with spans of 126 metres and 189 metres. It was continued on both sides by spans that were both 104 metres long and 10 metres high and on the eastern approach there was a bridge with a 51.8 metre-long span over local industrial rail tracks. To the west of the Rhine there was a brick viaduct with 19 spans, each 15.60 metres long, over the flood plain. A pedestrian bridge was attached on its northern side. The steel superstructure for the 907 metre-long rail bridge was built by two local construction companies, Friedrich-Alfred-Hütte (part of the Krupp group) of Rheinhausen and Harkort of Duisburg.

The eastern end of the bridge was made impassable by a bomb on 22 May 1944 during World War II. The adjacent Krupp factory built a temporary bridge and temporary piers within 17 days and the bridge was extensively repaired. However the following year German troops blew up the entire bridge on 4 March 1945, as they retreated from the western bank of the Rhine. They also completely destroyed the pier in the centre of the river.

=== The third bridge ===
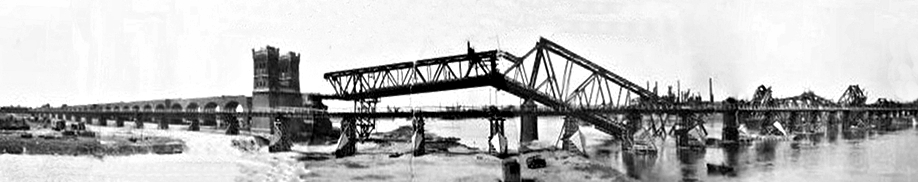
Victory Bridge at Duisburg - Rheinhausen, built in six days, fifteen hours and twenty minutes - then a record - at 2,815 feet (858 m) long over the Rhine River.

Immediately after the American army crossed the Rhine, the 332nd Engineer General Service Regiment (as a member of ADSEC Engineer Group "A") constructed a replacement railway bridge 2,815 feet (858 m) long over the river in the record time of six days, fifteen hours and twenty minutes. The bridge was completed 8 May 1945 and was named the "Victory Bridge" in English. This line was put back into operation on 12 May 1945. The ramps were built over the local marshalling yards of Krupp and German railways, partly assembled from the abundant debris that had accumulated on both sides as a result of the war.

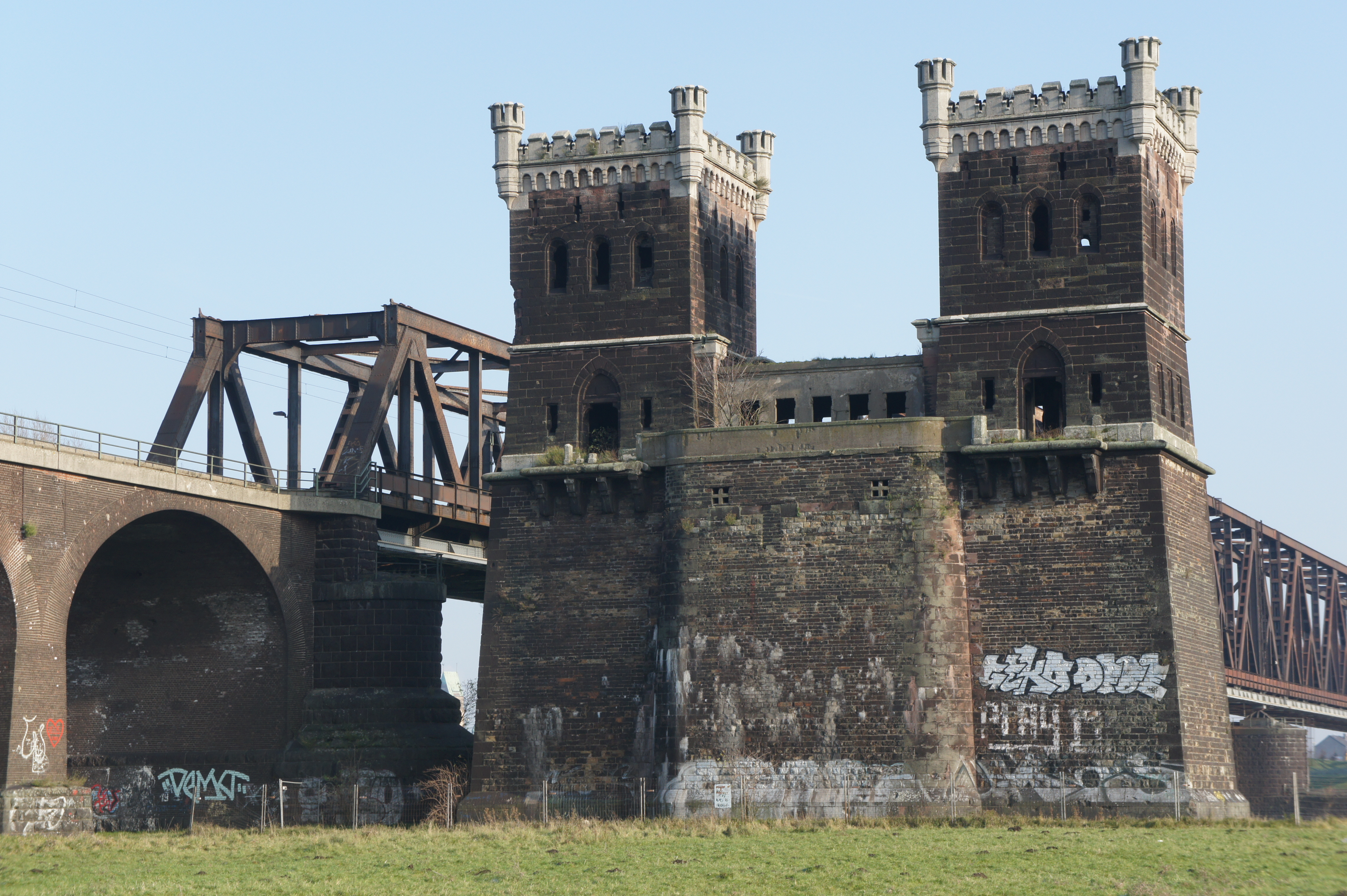
Old left bank bridge piers at the southwest of the Duisburg-Hochfeld bridge

=== The fourth bridge ===
In August 1945 work began on the recovery of the remains of the destroyed bridge superstructure. Still usable parts were recovered and reused. Almost half of the old structure was incorporated into the new bridge in its original form. The fourth bridge was put into operation on 1 October 1949 and it remains in operation.

In addition to freight trains, the bridge is used by Regionalbahn services RB 31, Der Niederrheiner, and RB 33, Rhein-Niers-Bahn, and Regional-Express service RE 2, Rhein-Haard-Express.

On the northern side of the bridge is a wide footpath, which is also used by cyclists.

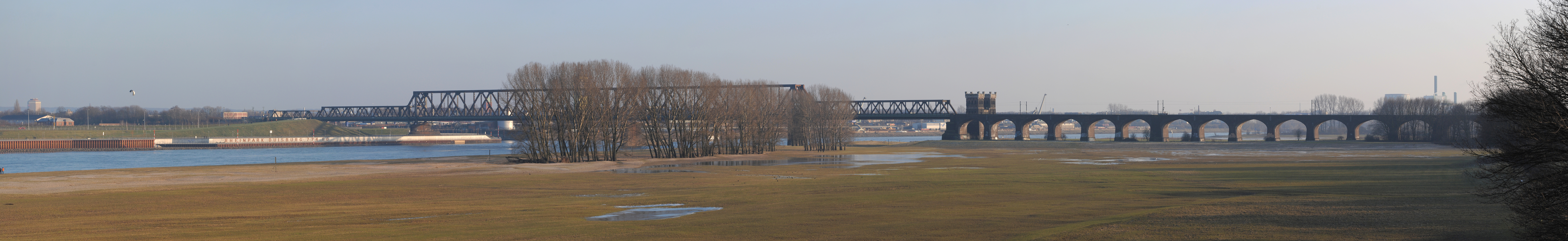
View from the north of the entire Duisburg-Hochfeld bridge from the Bridge of Solidarity

== See also ==
- List of bridges over the Rhine
