= Horchheim rail bridge =

Railway bridge across the Rhine in Germany

Coordinates: 50°19′59.27″N 7°35′39.9″E

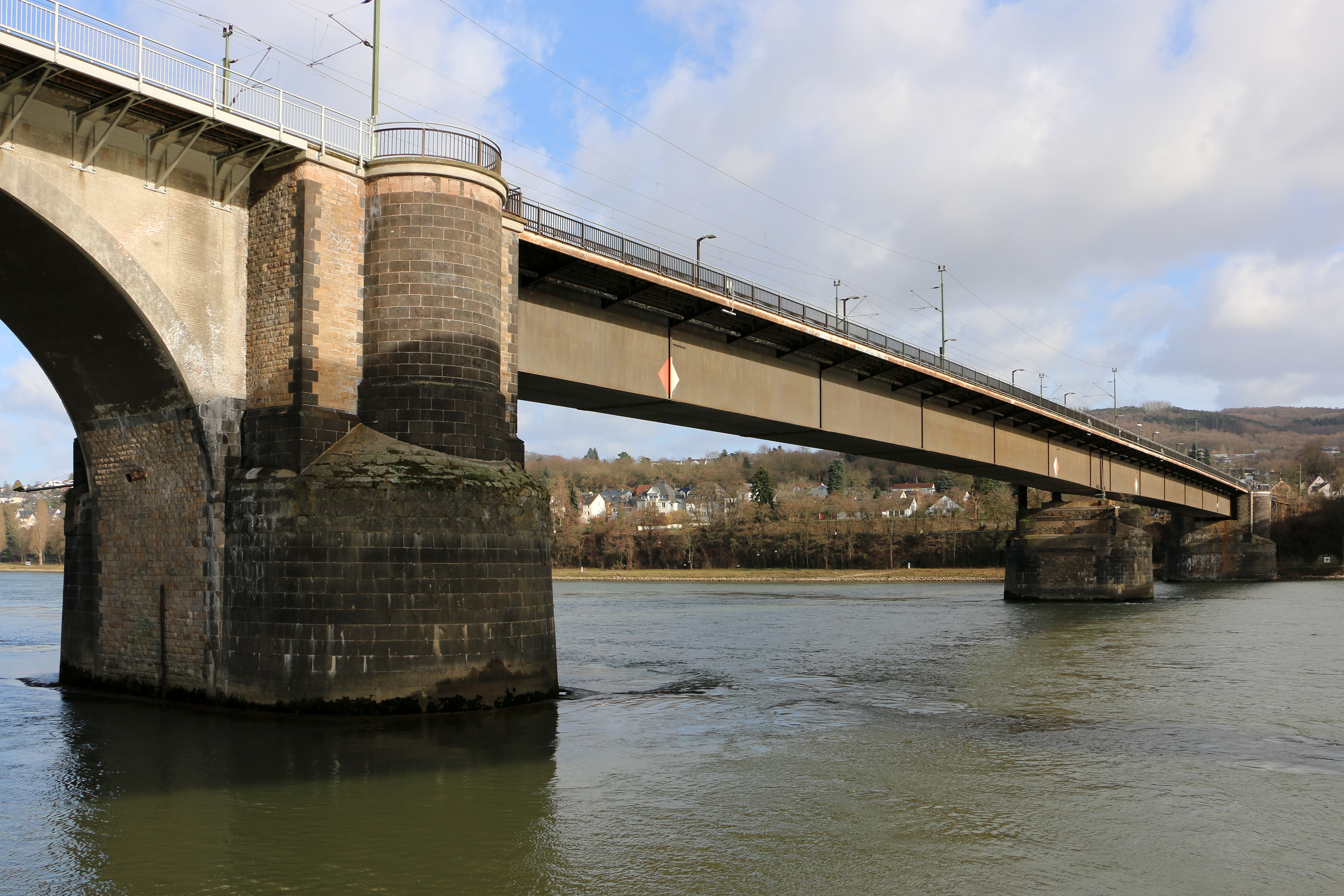
Horchheim rail bridge in Koblenz

The Horchheim rail bridge (German: Horchheimer Eisenbahnbrücke) is a railway bridge across the Rhine in Koblenz, Germany. The first bridge on the site was put into operation in 1879, but was badly damaged at the end of the Second World War. The bridge was temporarily restored to service in 1947, and the current bridge replaced it in 1961.

== See also ==
- List of bridges over the Rhine
