= Friedrich Gottlieb Stebler =

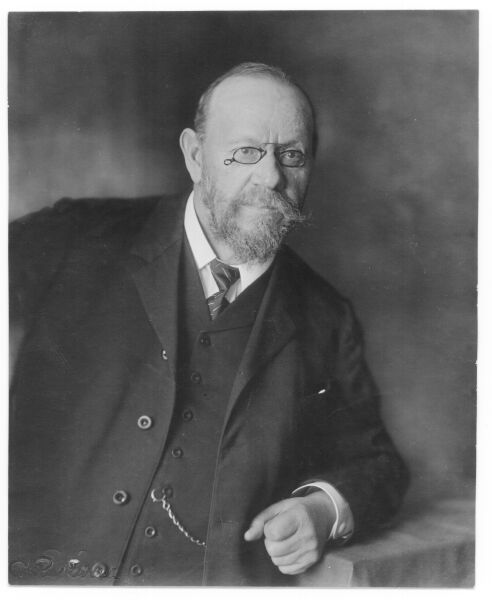
- Friedrich Gottlieb Stebler (1852-1935)
- Born: 11 August 1852
- Died: 7 April 1935
- Occupation(s): Agriculturalist and ethnographer

Friedrich Gottlieb Stebler (11 August 1852 in Safnern – 7 April 1935) was a Swiss agriculturalist and ethnographer.

== History ==
Following classes at the agricultural school in Rütti, he studied agriculture at the Universities of Halle and Leipzig. In 1875, he founded a private Samen-Kontrollstation (seed control station) in Mattenhof bei Bern.

In 1876 he gained his venia legendi at the Eidgenössische Technische Hochschule Zürich (ETH Zurich), where he taught classes in agricultural-related subjects until 1901. As an agriculturalist he published works on forage crops, alpine agriculture and pastoralism. From 1888 to 1899 he issued the exsiccata series Schweizerische Gräser-Sammlung, first with Carl Joseph Schröter and later with Albert Volkert. From 1889 to 1916 he was editor of the Schweizerischen Landwirtschaftlichen Zeitung.

As his career progressed, he developed an interest in ethnography, making frequent visits to Valais in order to study the lives and customs of its population.

== Selected writings ==
- Die bestern Futterpflanzen : Abbildungen und Beschreibungen derselben nebst ausführlicher Angaben betreffend deren Kultur, ökonom. Werth, Samen-Gewinnung, -Verunreinigungen, -Verfälschung, 1883 (with Carl Joseph Schröter); translated into English in 1889 - The best forage plants, etc.
- Les Mélanges de graines fourragères pour obtenir les plus forts rendements de bonne qualité : étude scientifique et pratique, 1888 (Translated from the German by C. Denaiffe) - Forage seed blends to obtain higher yields, etc.
