= Johann Jakob Früh =

Swiss geographer and geologist (1852–1938)

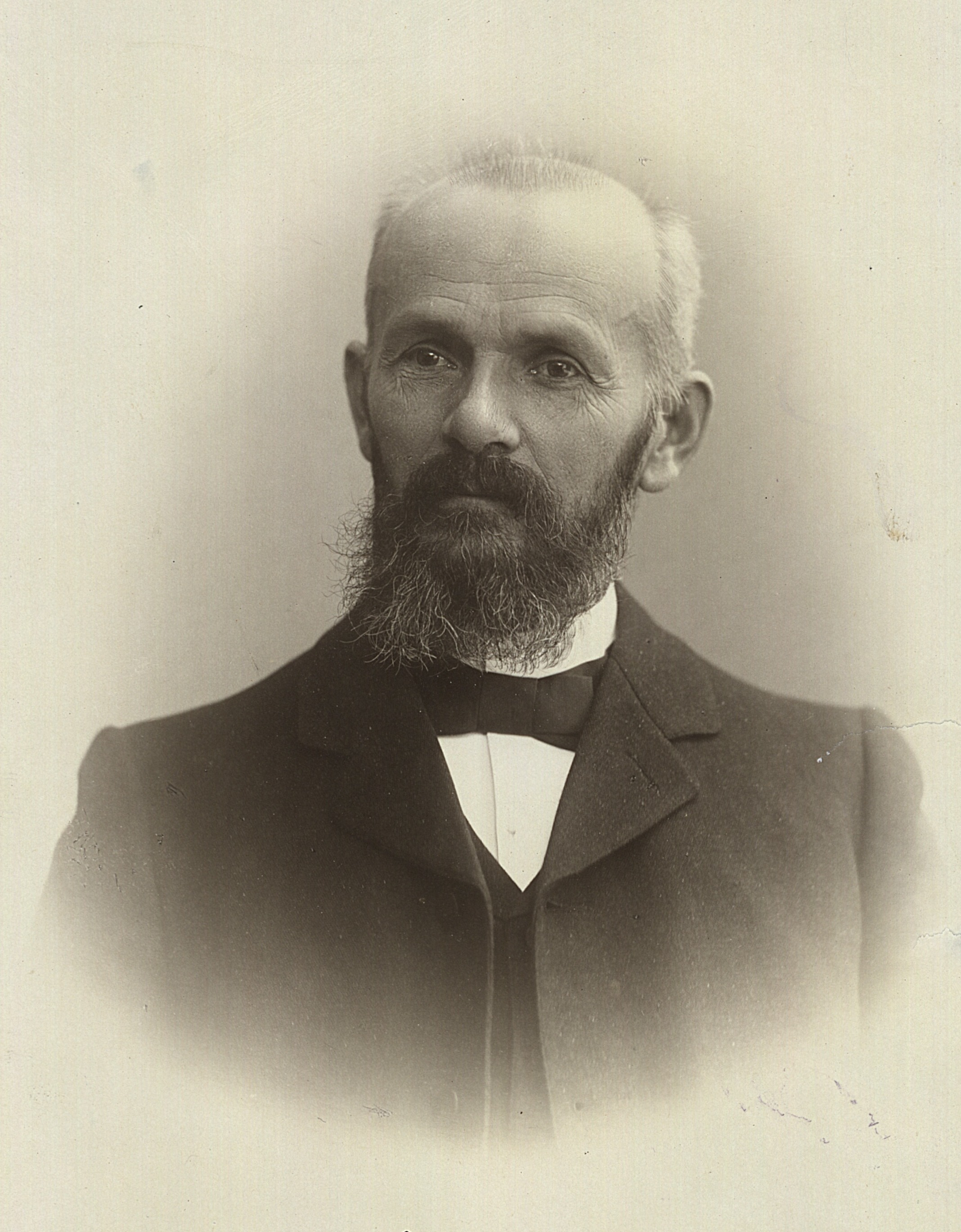
Johann Jakob Früh, c. 1899

Johann Jakob Früh (22 June 1852 in Märwil – 8 April 1938 in Zürich) was a Swiss geographer and geologist.

From 1869 to 1872 he attended the teacher's seminar in Kreuzlingen, then furthered his education at the University and Polytechnic in Zürich. From 1877 to 1890 he taught classes in natural sciences and geography at the cantonal school in Trogen, and afterwards worked as an assistant geologist at the Polytechnic in Zürich. In 1891 he obtained his habilitation, and in 1899 became the first full professor of geography at the Polytechnic.

== Published works ==
In 1930–38 he published a major work on Swiss geography, titled Geographie der Schweiz (3 volumes). With botanist Carl Joseph Schröter, he was co-author of a book on Swiss moorlands, called Die Moore der Schweiz : mit Berücksichtigung der gesamten Moorfrage (1904). Other noted works by Früh are:

- Über Torf und Dopplerit : eine minerogenetische Studie für Geognosten, Mineralogen, Forst- und Landwirthe, 1883 – On peat and dopplerite: a minerogenetic study.
- Beiträge zur Kenntniss der Nagelfluh der Schweiz, 1888 – Contributions to the knowledge of Switzerland's conglomerate.
