= Brücke der Solidarität =

Bridge across the Rhine in Duisburg, Germany

Bridge of Solidarity Brücke der Solidarität
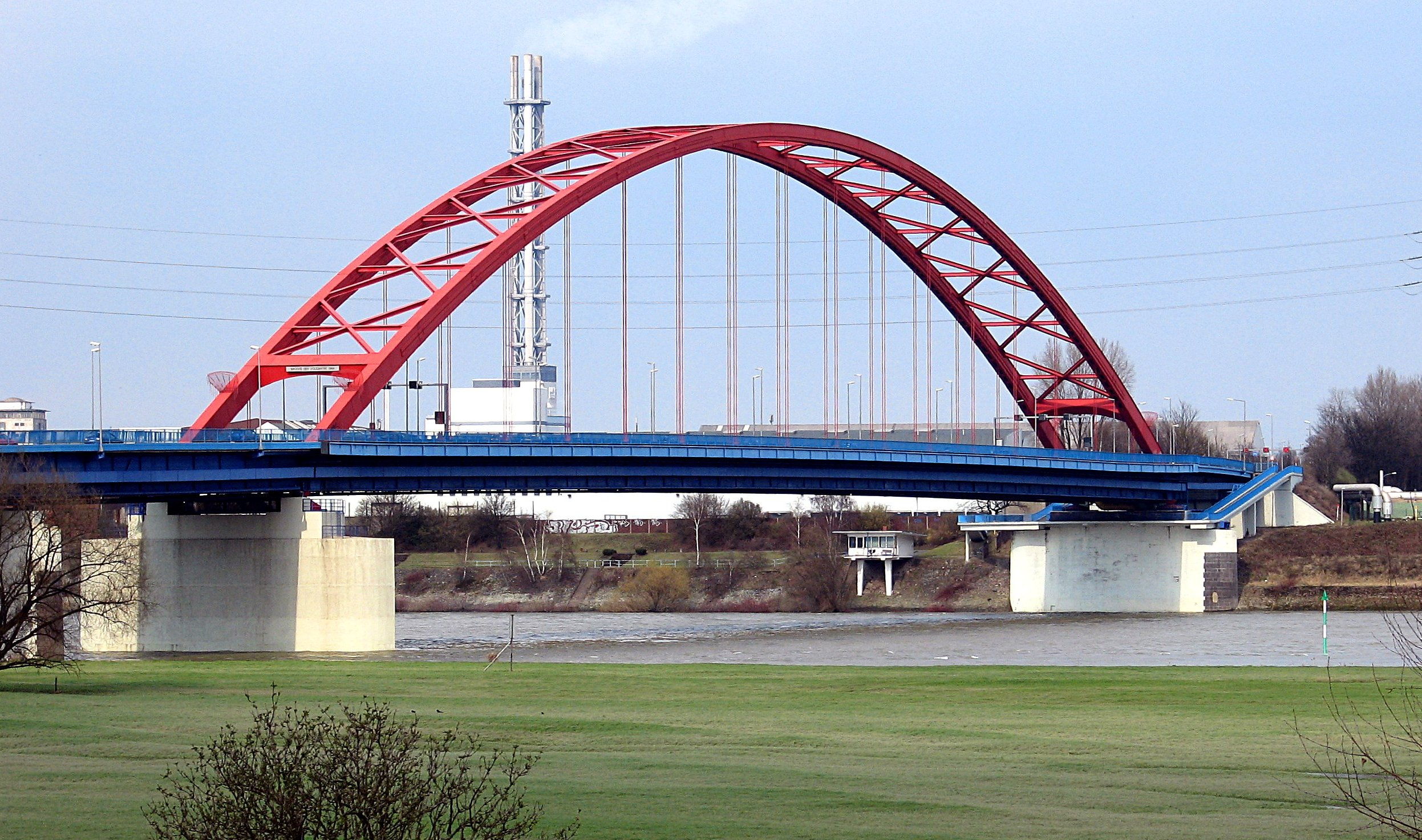
- Bridge as seen from the southern approach
- Coordinates: 51°24′54″N 6°44′19″E
- Carries: Moerser Straße
- Crosses: Rhine
- Locale: Duisburg
- Other name(s): Admiral-Graf-Spee-Brücke since 1988: Brücke der Solidarität

Characteristics
- Design: Tied-arch bridge
- Total length: 255.9 m
- Height: 35 m

History
- Construction start: July 1945
- Inaugurated: 3 July 1950

Location
- Interactive map of Bridge of Solidarity

The Bridge of Solidarity (German: Brücke der Solidarität) is a bridge across the Rhine between the boroughs of Rheinhausen and Hochfeld in the city of Duisburg.

== Bridge history ==
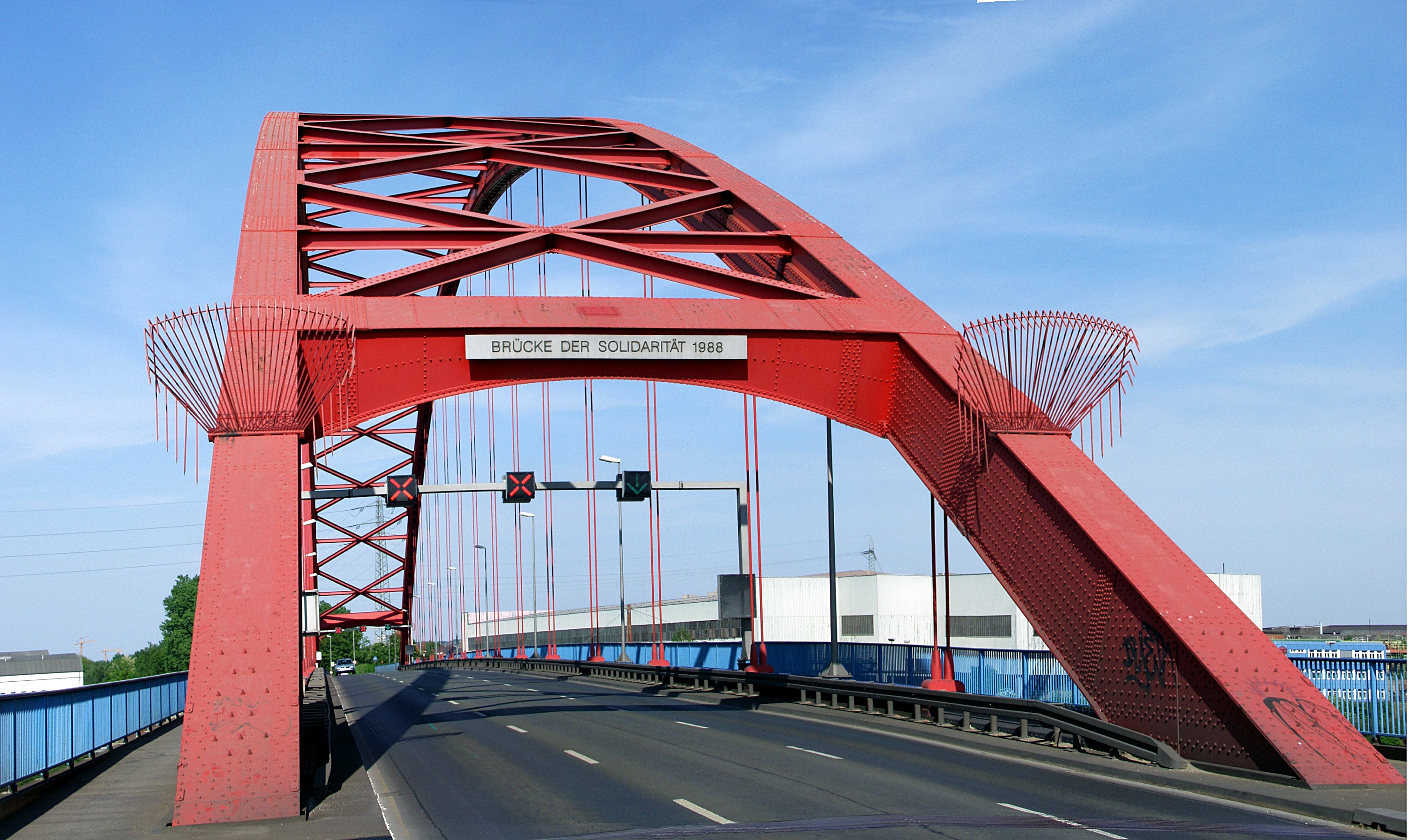
Lanes with name plate

Construction on the bridge's predecessor, the Admiral-Graf-Spee-Brücke, was started on 12 January 1934 and the bridge was inaugurated on 22 May 1936 by then-minister Joseph Goebbels. Total building cost was 6.75 million Reichsmark. Like the Duisburg-Hochfeld Railway Bridge, the bridge was blown up by the retreating Wehrmacht on 4 March 1945. Only the floodplain bridge on the left bank of the Rhine remained.

In July 1945, a new bridge was already under construction and the bridge was opened to traffic on 3 July 1950. Following a recommendation of Krupp Stahlbau Rheinhausen, the new bridge was built as a Tied-arch bridge, the largest of its kind in Germany at the time with a span of 255.9 metres. While the previous bridge had four lanes, the British Military government insisted on a three-lane bridge. The bridge was thoroughly renovated in the early 1990s, especially the old floodplain bridge parts. Since a few years, it is possible to adjust the direction of the lanes to current demand by a traffic light system.

== Technical data ==
- Type of construction: Tied-arch bridge
- Arch width: 255.91 m
- Pfeilhöhe 35.5 m
- Versteifungsträger: einwandig genietete Blechträger mit 4320 mm Stegblechhöhe
- Abstand der Versteifungsträger: 12.4 m
- Steghöhe des Hutquerschnitts: 1.7 m am Scheitel, 2.10 m am Kämpfer
- Carriageway width: 9 m (3 lanes at 3 m each)
- Cycle lane width: 1.1 m
- Footpath width: 1.8 m

== Naming ==
In 1987, Rheinhausen was present in the media due to the protests against the closing of the local steelworks. On 10 December 1987 the bridge was occupied by Krupp workers to protest against the closure of their plant. During the whole winter of 1987 and 1988 large demonstrations against the closing of the remaining smeltery followed. Apart from the Rhine bridge, protesters also occupied the Bundesautobahn 40 and blockaded the Krupp head offices at Villa Hügel in Essen. Pickets accompanied the conflicts for months. Therefore, Rheinhausen became a synonym for steel crisis. The Rheinhausen-Hochfeld bridge was renamed to Brücke der Solidarität by the protesting workers on 20 January 1988. On this day, 50,000 steel workers from more than 60 melteries marched to the bridge. The apprentices of the Krupp training workshop manufactured the new name plate overnight. Soon thereafter, the name was officially adapted by the city of Duisburg.

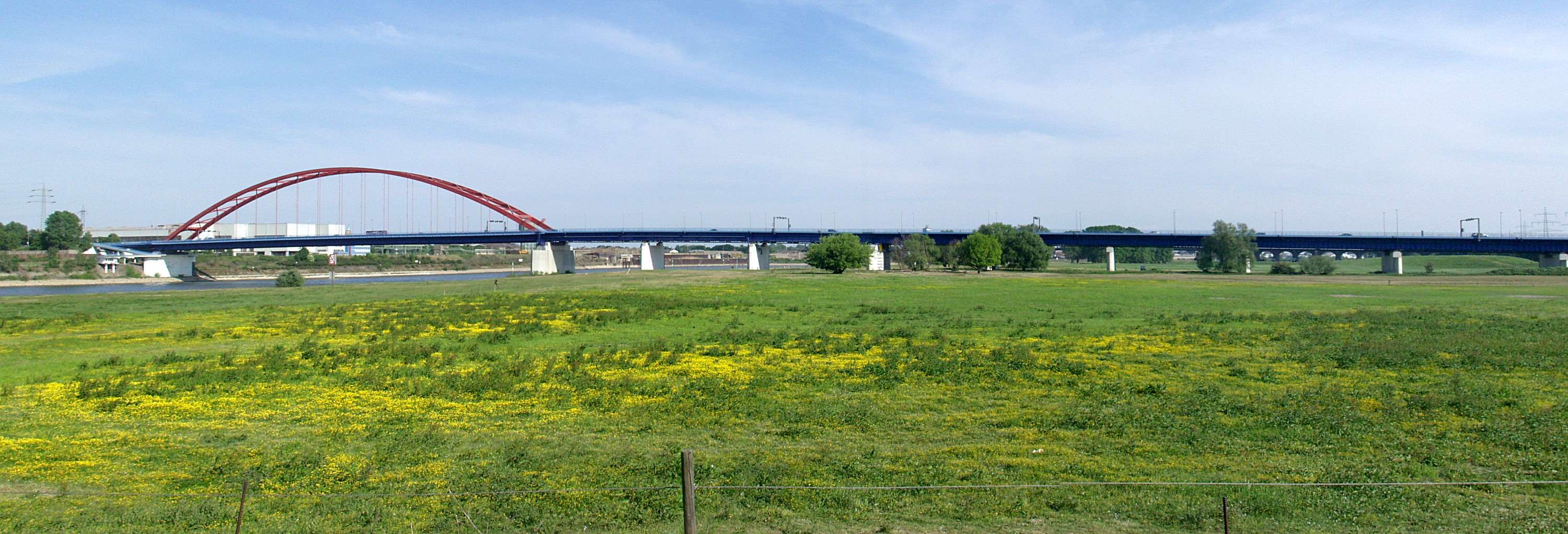
Panoramic view from the left side of the Rhine

== See also ==
- List of bridges over the Rhine
- List of bridges in Germany
