= South Bridge (Cologne) =

South Bridge, Cologne
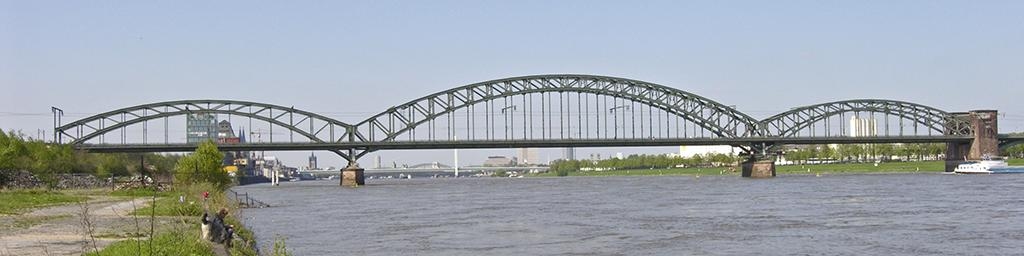
- Coordinates: 50°55′2″N 6°58′26″E
- Carries: Trains
- Crosses: Rhine
- Locale: Cologne, North Rhine-Westphalia, Germany
- Official name: Südbrücke

Characteristics
- Design: Tied-arch
- Total length: 368 m (1,207 ft)
- Width: 10.34 m (34 ft)
- Longest span: 165 m (541 ft)

History
- Construction start: 8 November 1906; 1947
- Construction end: 1910; 1950
- Opened: 5 April 1910

Location
- Interactive map of South Bridge, Cologne

The South Bridge (German: Südbrücke [ˈzyːtˌbʁʏkə]; Kölsch: Söhdbrök [ˈzǿtˌbʁøk]) is a bridge over the Rhine on the Cologne freight bypass railway in Cologne in the German state of North Rhine-Westphalia. On the west side of the Rhine, it forms the border between the districts of Neustadt-Süd and Köln-Bayenthal. On the east bank of the Rhine it forms the border between Köln-Deutz and Köln-Poll.

The two track South Bridge is used by railway traffic, pedestrians and cyclists. Since its construction it has been used mainly by freight services. Some Intercity-Express services were also scheduled to run over the bridge before the rebuilding of Köln Messe/Deutz station.

== History ==
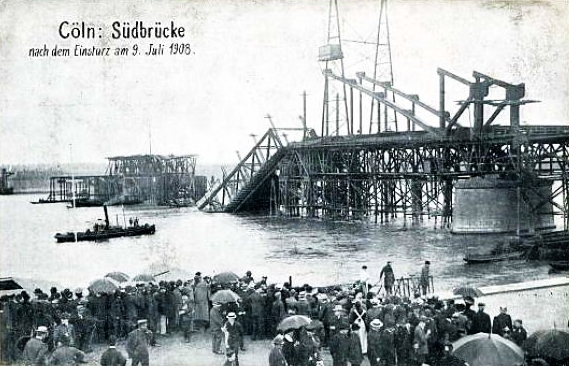
Collapse of the South Bridge on 9 July 1908

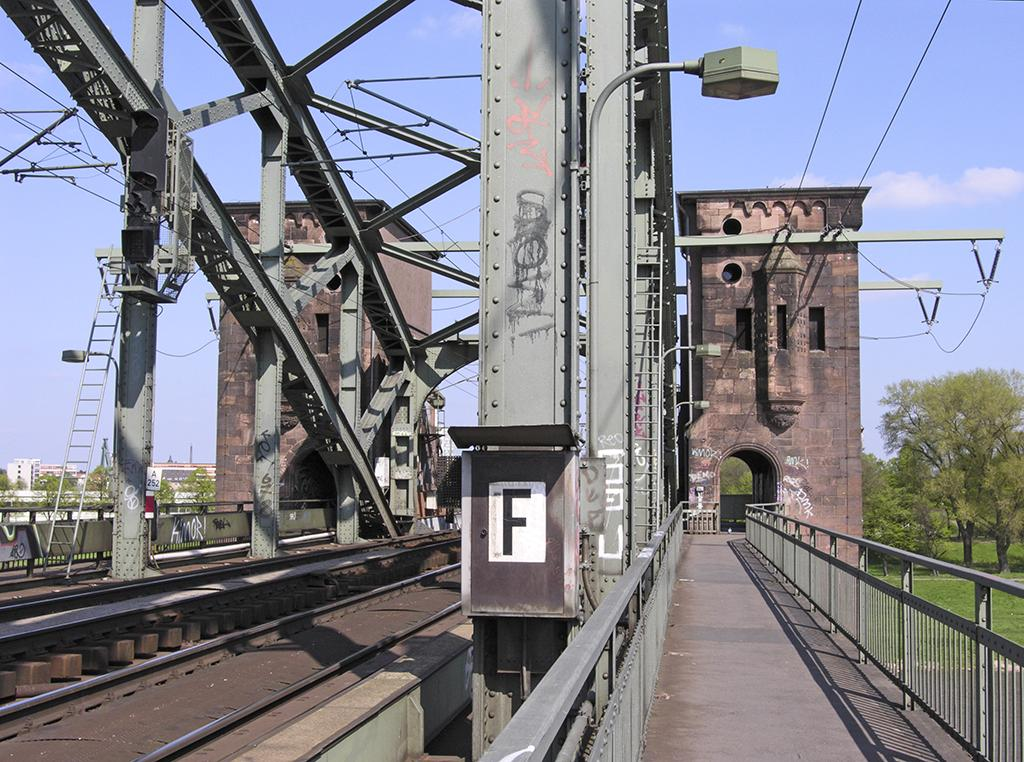
Köln-Poll, South Bridge (pylons on the east side of the Rhine). Note the outriggers mounted on the pylons carrying high-voltage power lines.

The South Bridge was built from 1906 (start of construction: 8 November 1906) to 1910 for 5.5 million marks by the Prussian state railways under the direction of the head of the board of works, Fritz Beermann. The design was in the hands of Frederick Dircksen, who also initially directed the construction. The designs of the stonework at the portals, the ramps and the piers was carried out by the Berlin architect Franz Schwechten, who designed the corresponding work for the Hohenzollern Bridge. It was officially put into service on 5 April 1910. The construction of sidewalks on both sides of the bridge was funded by the city of Cologne. An opening ceremony was dispensed with as a result of a severe accident in 1908 (during the building of the middle truss arch), in which eight workers were killed.

The steel main structure has three spans (101.5 m + 165 m + 101.5 m) with a total length of 368 m and a width of 10.34 m. The pylons are built in a Romanesque Revival style and furnished with rich sculptural decorations, which were made by the Berlin sculptor Gotthold Riegelmann (1864–1935).

In the Second World War, the South Bridge was largely destroyed in an air raid on 6 January 1945. The central span lying in the stream had to be demolished and therefore was no longer available for the reconstruction. In May 1946, the bridge was first opened provisionally with a single track and later rebuilt for DM 10 million, resuming operations on 1 October 1950. As with its northern counterpart, the Hohenzollern Bridge, the reconstruction did not include the decorative parts of the portals and pylons. Part of the square stone block was used for the reconstruction of the stone arches over the Rheinallee and on the bank at Porz. The total length of the bridge is now 536 m.

Today, the bridge is owned by Deutsche Bahn. The city of Cologne is responsible for the maintenance and care of the sidewalks.

== Conservation ==
The bridge is now heritage-listed for its historical importance as a railway because of its steel truss construction and partially preserved Romanesque Revival stonework. The Rheinische Verein für Denkmalpflege und Landschaftsschutz (Rhenish Association for heritage conservation and landscape protection) presented it as the monument of the month in May 2006, in order to draw attention to its condition.

The renovation of sidewalks and the pylons located on both sides of the Rhine began in December 2009. The costs amounted to about €5.1 million.

== See also ==
- List of bridges over the Rhine
