= Max Früh =

Max Früh is a small German specialist construction company mostly building bridges. It was established in 1908.

One of its flagship projects was the construction of the Pierre Pflimlin bridge over the Rhine south of Strasbourg in the early 2000s together with Bilfinger Berger.
