= Pierre Pflimlin Bridge =

Bridge near Strasbourg

Coordinates: 48.491400°N 7.769740°E

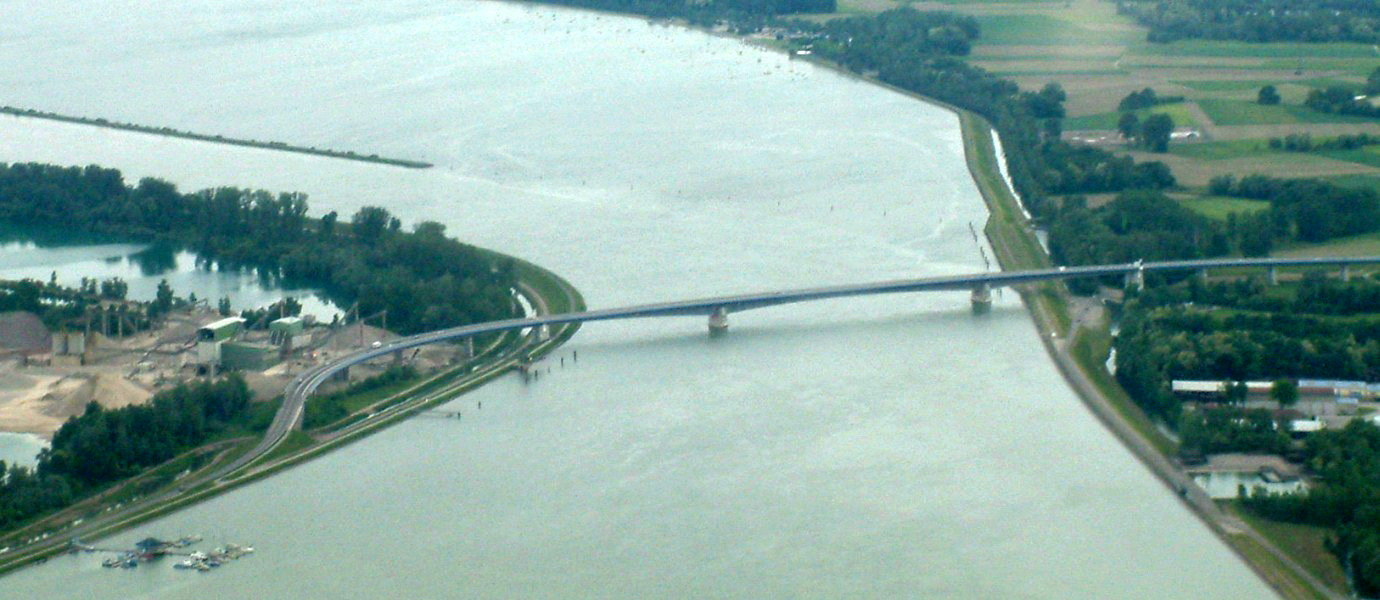
The bridge seen from the north.

The Pierre Pflimlin Bridge (French: Pont Pierre Pflimlin) is a 957-metre (3,140 ft) long motorway cantilever bridge over the river Rhine, with a main span measuring 205 metres (673 ft). It connects Germany and France, at Kehl and Strasbourg. It is named after Pierre Pflimlin, a former French prime minister, and was opened in 2002. It was funded by France, Germany and the European Union.

== Construction ==
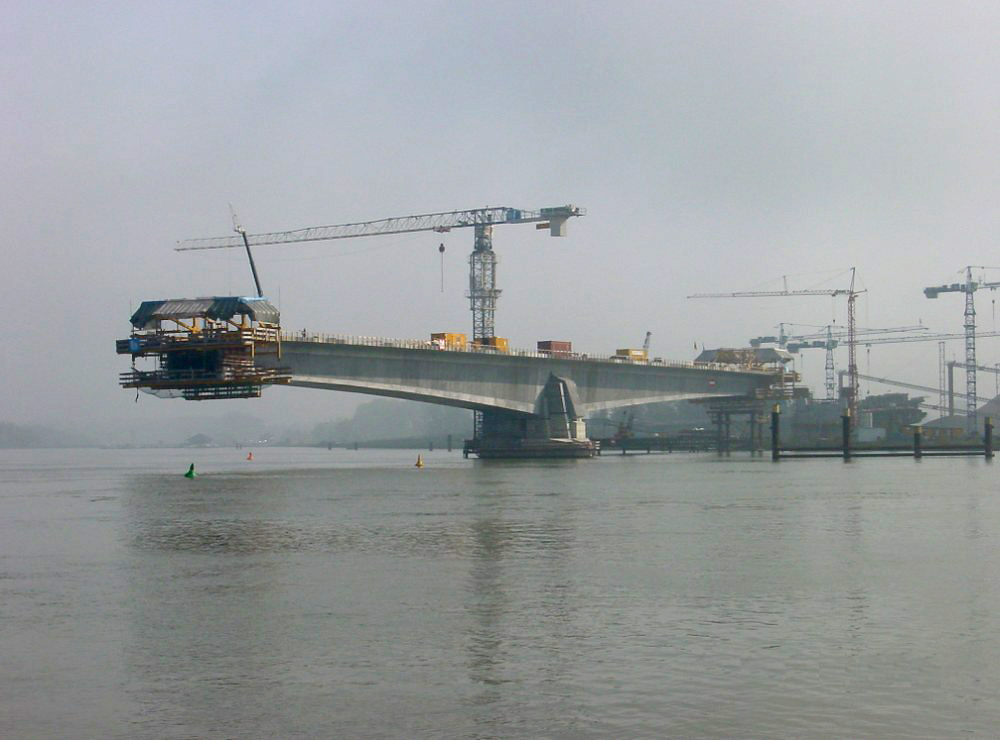
The bridge being built over the Rhine south of Strasbourg.

Planned for several decades, it was built during the late 1990s and early 2000s by the construction companies Bilfinger Berger and Max Früh.

- The central segments (located over the river) were built in balanced cantilever, cast-in-place fashion, extending outwards from each of the two pylon islands constructed in the stream. A concrete volume of 18.000 m3, 760 t of prestressing steel, and 2.700 t of reinforcing steel were used in total.
- The pylons were constructed on caissons floated into place and secured with 50 m deep foundation piles, and are designed to withstand earthquakes and ship impacts.
- The approach bridge on the French side was built in segments, and then pushed horizontally onto the approach pylons, while the approach bridge section on the German side was built by another German company and was cast in place with standard formwork.
- The hollow construction of all bridge segments has both pre-stressed and post-stressed components, realized by the French specialist construction company Freyssinet. The formwork was provided by PERI.

The funding for its construction was provided 55.5% by France, 38.6% by Germany and 5.9% by the European Union.

== Function ==
The bridge's main purpose is to reduce pressure on the only other Rhine bridge in the vicinity, the Europe bridge (French: Pont de l'Europe or German: Europabrücke), also located at Strasbourg-Kehl, to the north. The Pierre Pflimlin Bridge links the motorway Lauterbourg–Strasbourg–Saint-Louis–Basle from France to the A5 Hamburg–Frankfurt–Basel motorway in Germany.

It has two lanes to carry cars and other motor vehicles and two lanes reserved for pedestrian and cycle traffic. Due to the Schengen Agreement, there are no border controls on the bridge, despite it spanning the French–German border.

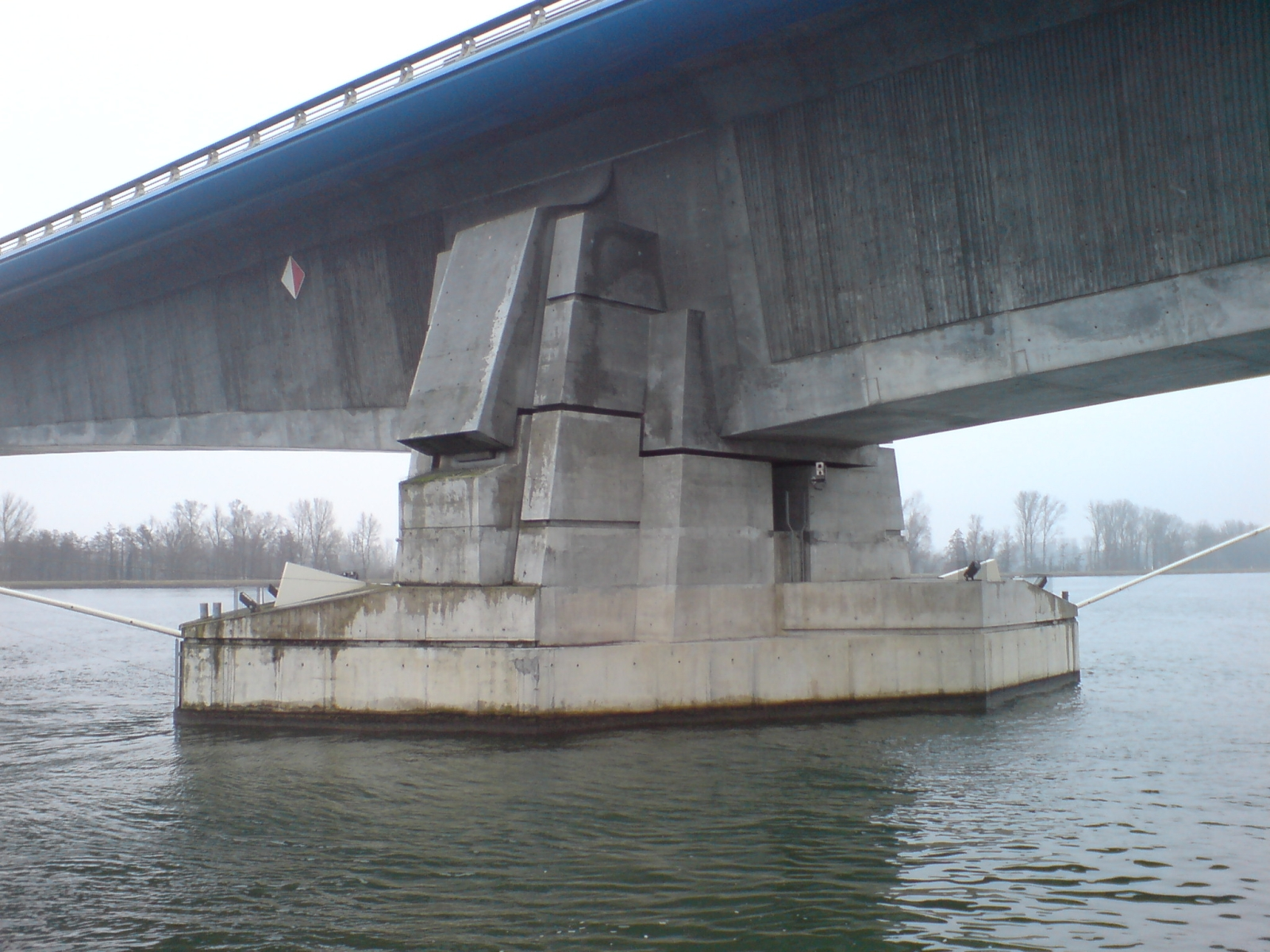
One of the piers, a caisson floated to the site and anchored with deep foundation piles.

== See also ==
- List of bridges in France
- List of bridges in Germany
- List of international bridges
