= Konrad Adenauer Bridge =

German bridge between Mannheim and Ludwigshafen am Rhein

Coordinates: 49°28′52″N 8°27′23″E

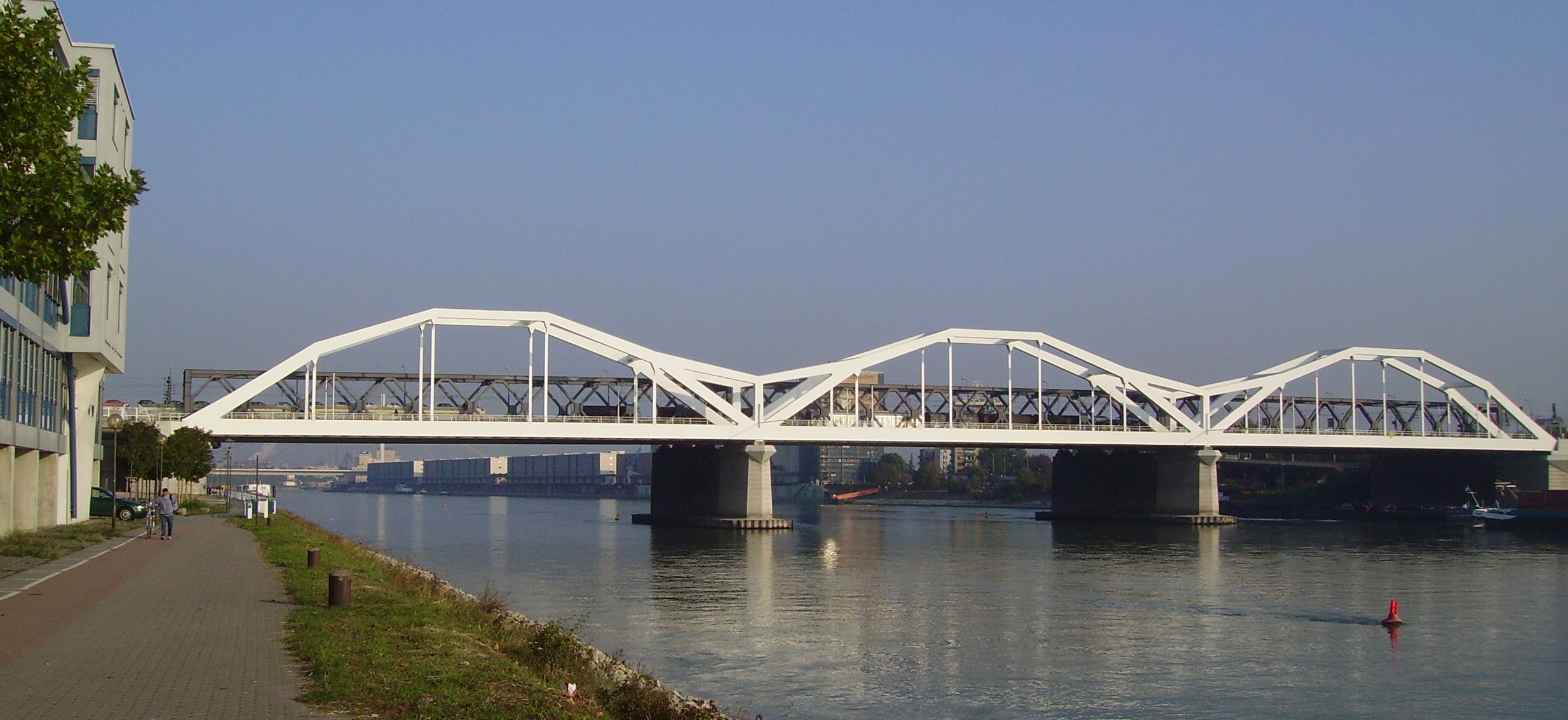
Konrad Adenauer Bridge

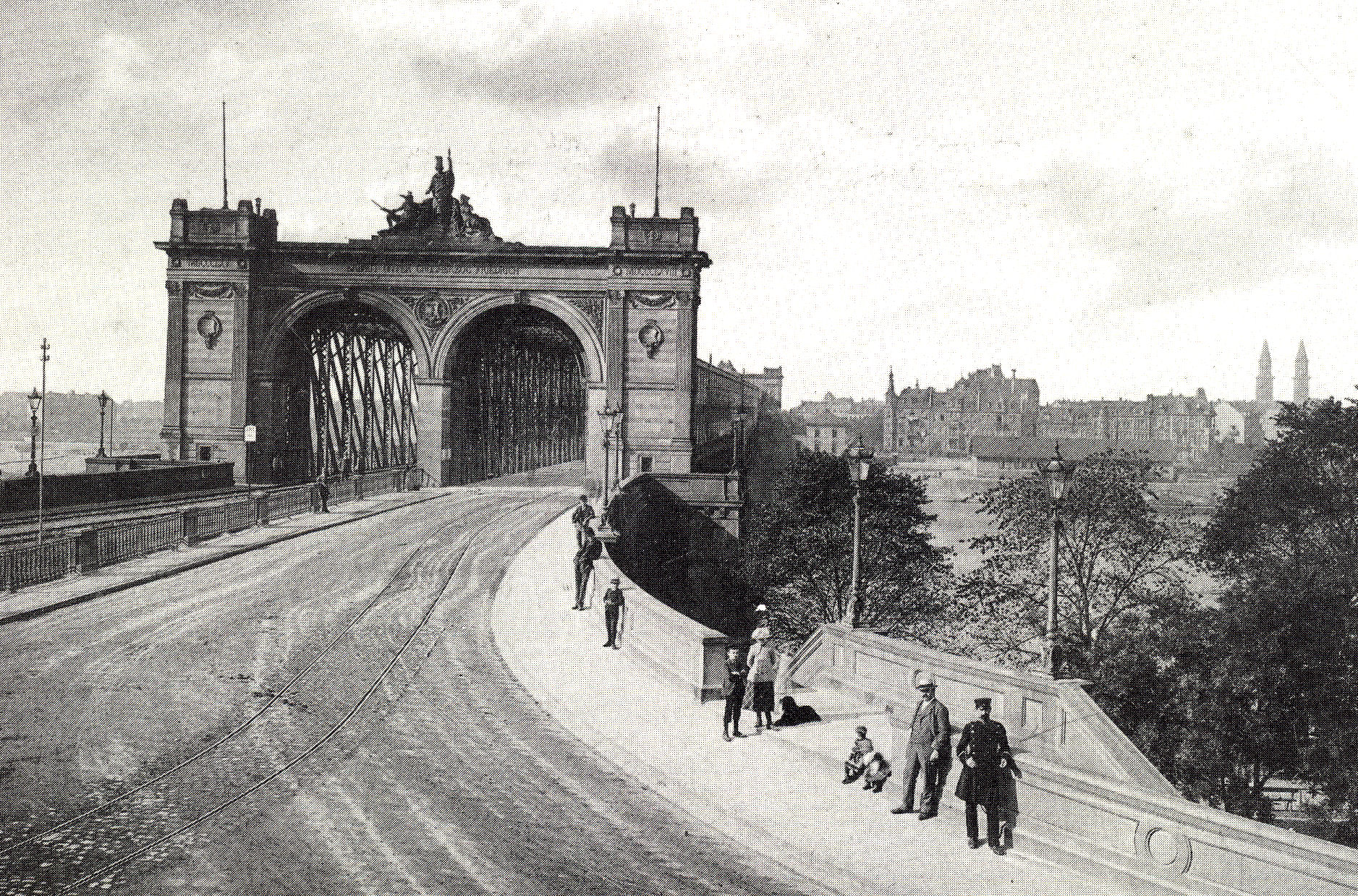
Rhine bridge in 1893 with the portal on the Mannheim side

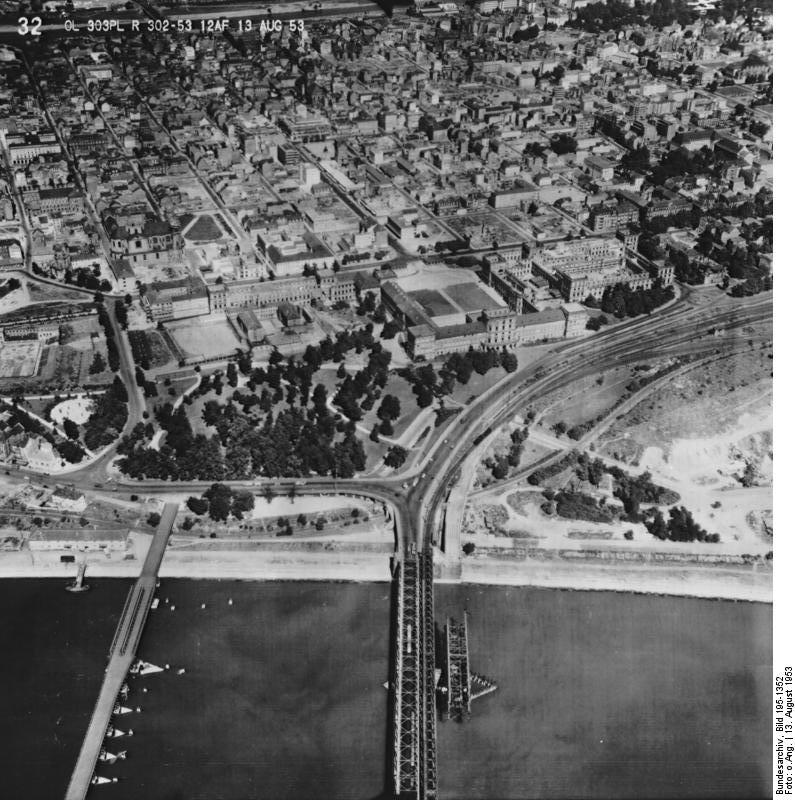
Temporary bridges in 1953

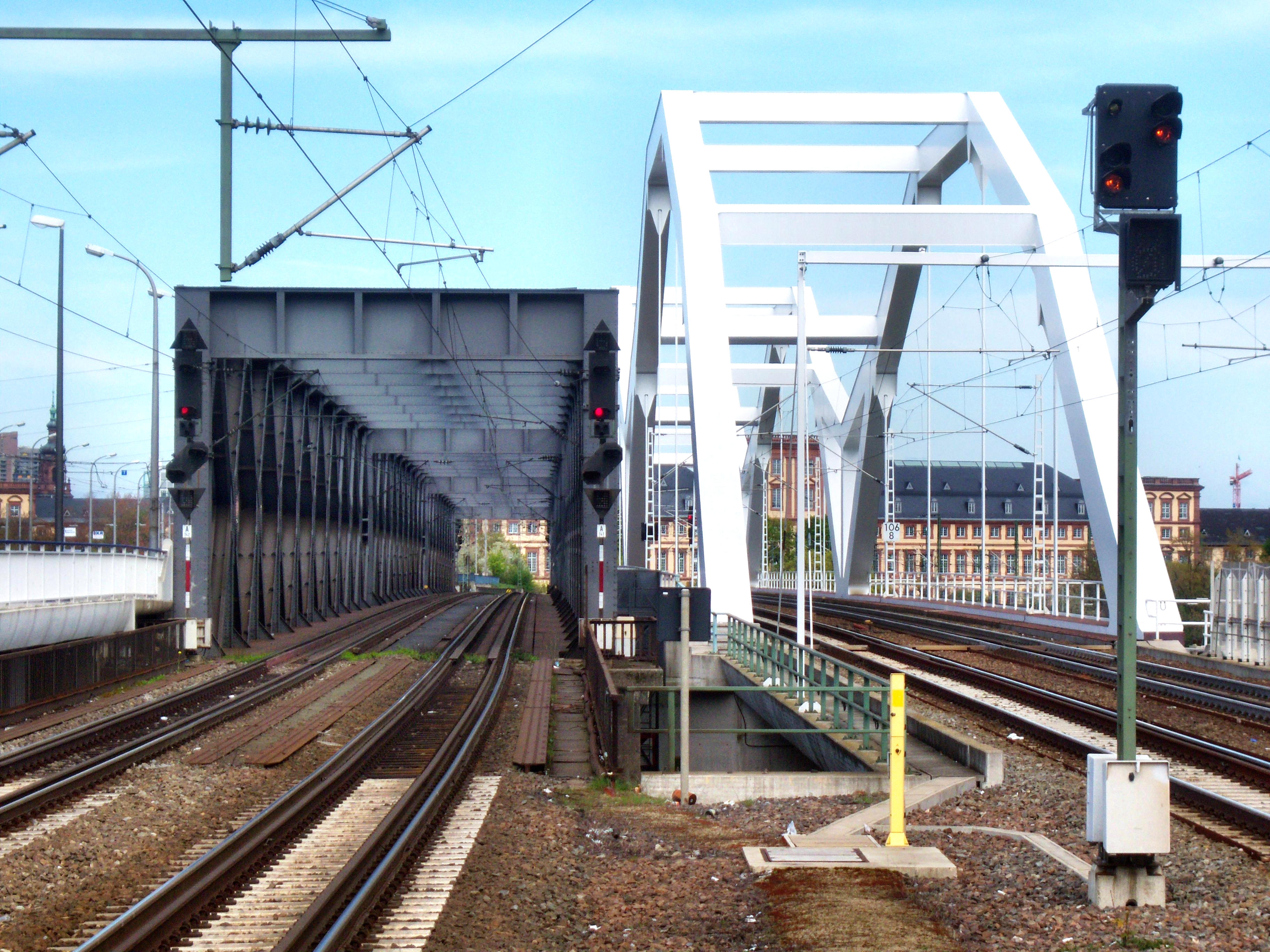
The Konrad Adenauer railway bridges—left the old bridge, right the new bridge

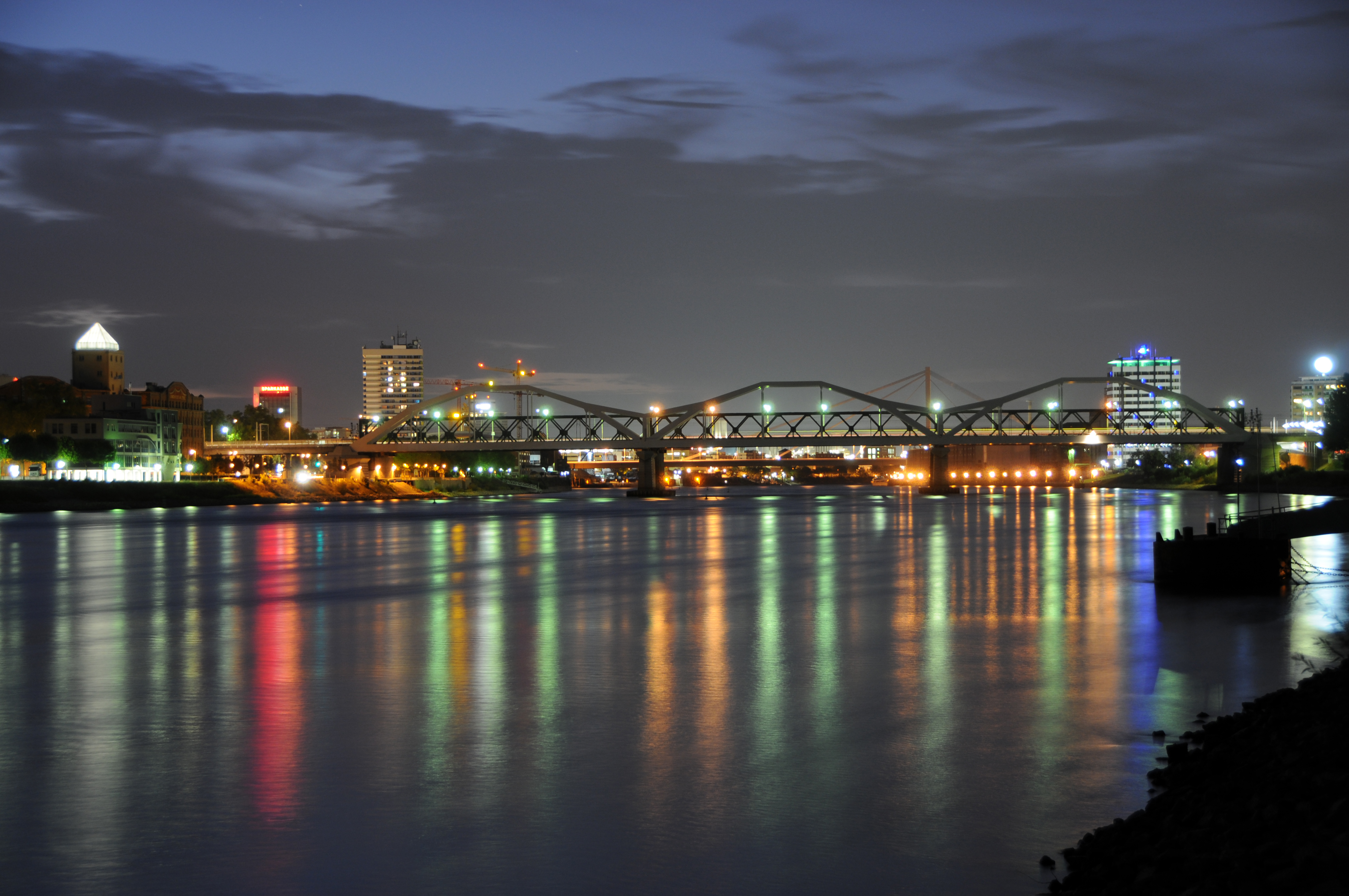
View from Stephanienufer, Mannheim-Lindenhof, at night

The Konrad Adenauer Bridge (in German: Konrad-Adenauer-Brücke) is one of two road bridges crossing the Rhine between the German cities of Mannheim and Ludwigshafen am Rhein. The other bridge is the Kurt Schumacher Bridge.

The road bridge connects a network of roads from behind Mannheim Palace across the Rhine to Ludwigshafen. It carries Federal Highway 37 and a tram track. Two rail bridges are adjacent to the road bridge, carrying the Palatine Ludwig Railway and the Rhine-Neckar S-Bahn line.

== History ==
In 1669, the Elector Charles Louis built a floating bridge, which consisted of a platform secured to two barges anchored in the Rhine. In 1705 this bridge was replaced by a pontoon bridge that had to be rebuilt as a result of flood damage.

In the age of industrialisation and the railway, it became increasingly important by 1863 to build a fixed bridge at the site of the pontoon bridge. The bridge was designed in 1863 and 1864. The first chairman of the planning commission was Paul Camille von Denis. The combined road and rail bridge was built between 1865 and 1868. Impressive portal buildings, designed by the Karlsruhe architect Josef Durm, were built at the ends of the bridge. A sculpture of Minerva with industry and trade made by Karl Friedrich Moest was erected on the railway bridge.

The bridges themselves were built as 10-metre-high (33 ft) steel trusses. Their total length was about 270 metres, the railway bridge was 7.5 metres wide and the road bridge was 6.5 metres wide. On each side there was a 1.8-metre-wide (5.9 ft) footpath. By 1906 the bridge was found to be too narrow. It took until 1928 to begin planning an upgrade of the bridge. A new railway bridge was built directly beside the existing bridge in 1931 and 1932. The old railway bridge was converted for road traffic. The new bridge was also built with a steel framework, but without arches. In 1936 the bridge was named by the Nazis after Albert Leo Schlageter. At the end of World War II on 20 March 1945 the bridge was blown up by the German army. After the war, temporary bridges were built over the Rhine River connecting the railway in July 1946 and for the road in December 1948.

=== Konrad Adenauer Bridge ===
The road bridge was rebuilt between 1956 and 1959 and opened on 24 October 1959 under the name "Rhine Bridge". It was named the Konrad Adenauer Bridge in 1967. A separate S-Bahn bridge was built directly next to the railway bridge between 1997 and 1999. It is an arch bridge.

== Specifications ==
- Railway bridge
- 1955 railway bridge
  - Type: steel truss bridge
  - Length: 273.9 m
  - Span: 3 x 91.3 m
  - Height: 10 m
- 2000 railway bridge
  - Type: arch bridge
  - Length: 273.9 m
  - Span: 3 x 91.3 m
  - Height: 20 m
- Road bridge
  - Type: girder bridge
  - Length: 273.9 m
  - Span: 3 x 91.3 m
  - Width: 30.2 m
