= Dopplerite =

Dopplerite is a naturally occurring organic substance found in amorphous, elastic or jelly-like masses, of brownish-black color, in peat beds in Styria and in Switzerland. It is tasteless, insoluble in alcohol and ether, and is described by James Dwight Dana as an acid substance, or mixture of different acids, related to humic acid. It is named after the physicist and mathematician Christian Doppler.
