= Ley (landform) =

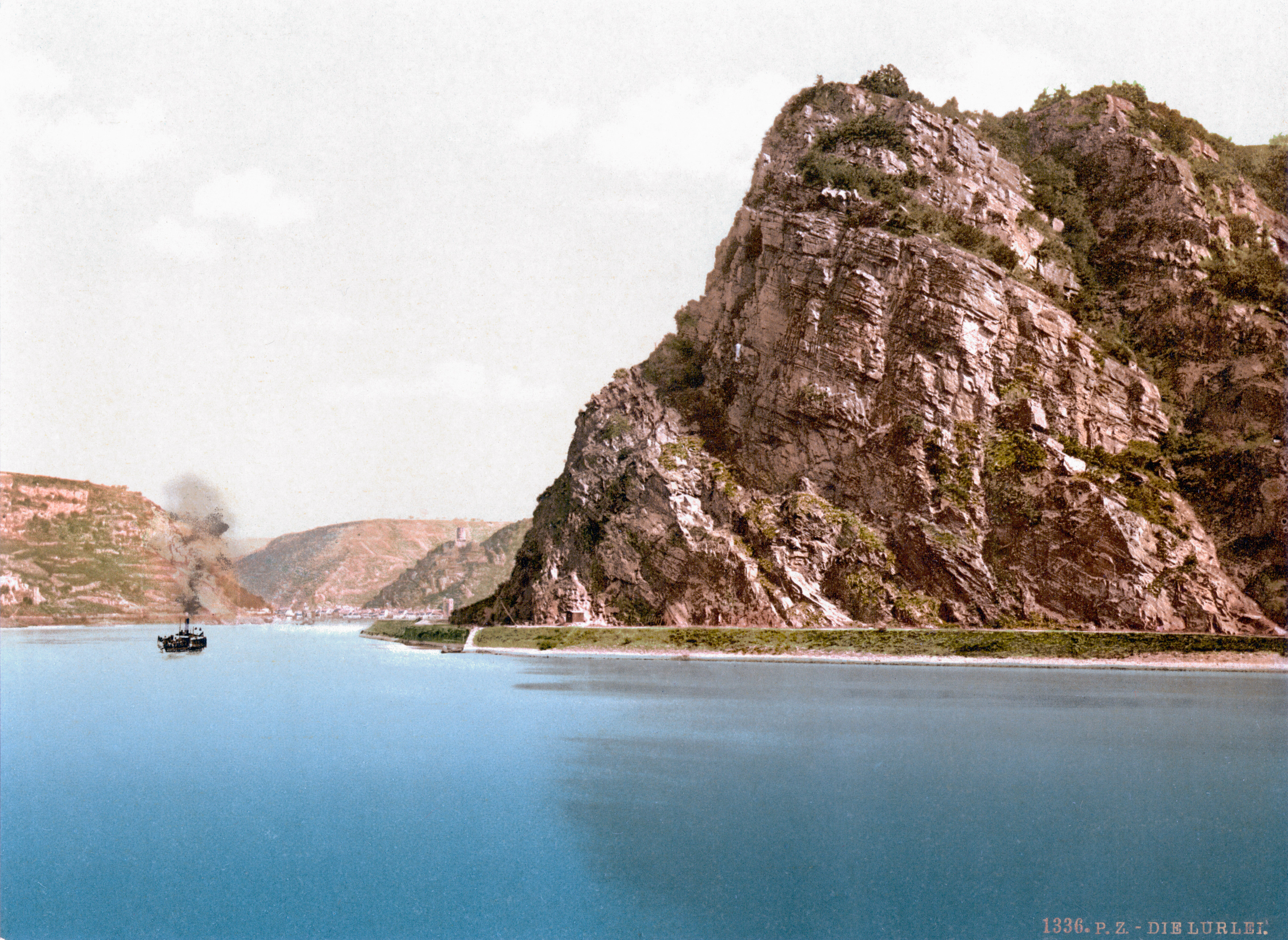
The Loreley on the River Rhine, c. 1900

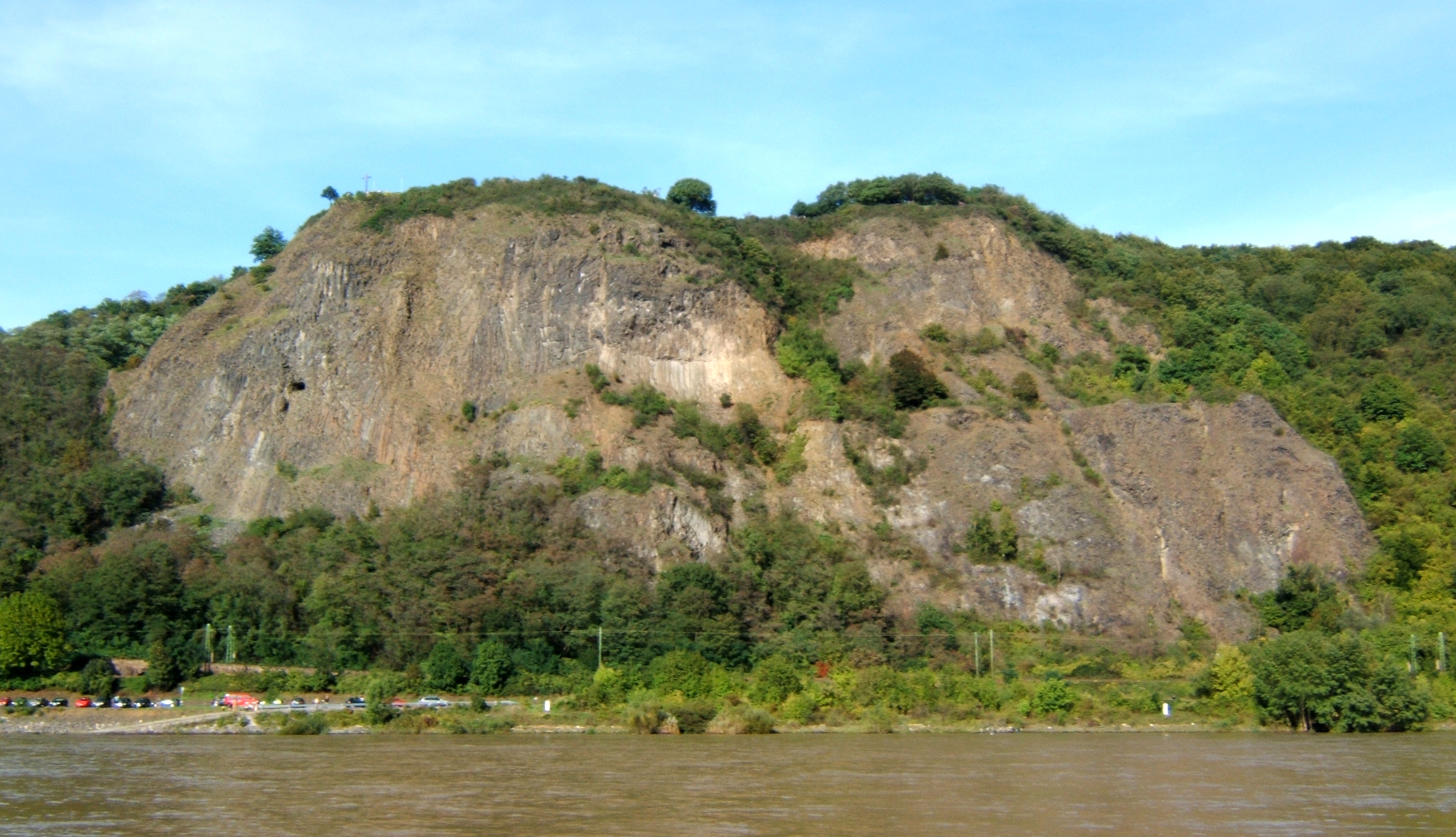
Erpeler Ley on the Rhine

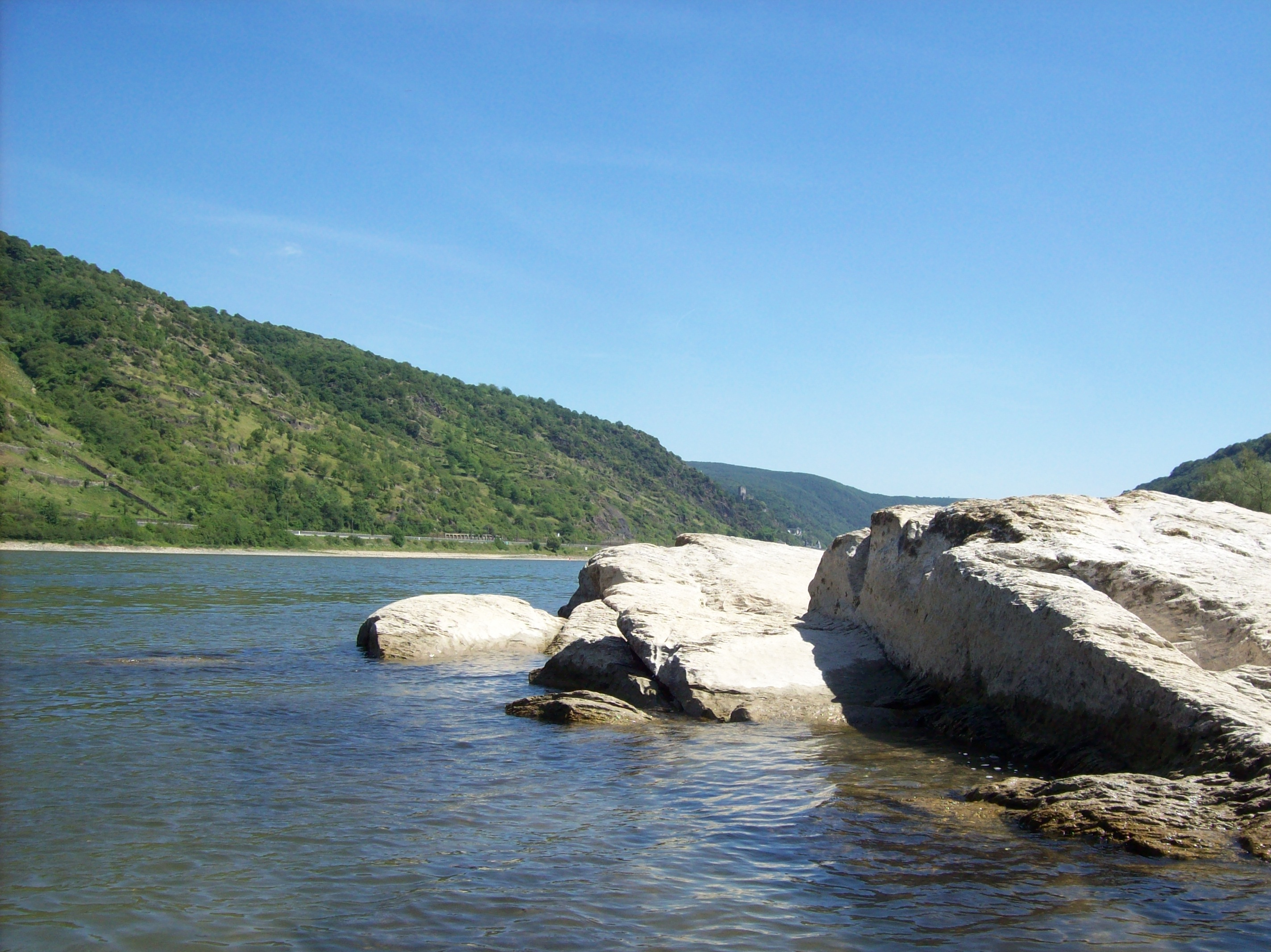
The Rabenlay near Oberwesel

Ley (the Ley, plural: the Leyen) is an old German word for rock, cliff or crag which often occurs in placenames.

== Etymology ==
Ley, also lay, lei, lai, laige or lägge, and, according to Grimm, leie, is a commonly occurring name for rocks or crags in the Rhenish and Lower German language regions. It is derived from the Old Saxon word, lêia. It is particularly associated with rock precipices (Felsabbrüche) and rock faces (Felswände), but also with rock slabs (Felsplatte). In addition, it is also used in the sense of shale or slate (Leienstein), and also to mean "slate" in the sense of a blackboard or roofing tile (Leiendecker). Its Dutch form is leyde or leye.

In addition to natural rock walls, an artificial quarry, such as the basalt quarries of the Eifel, may be called a Ley or Lay. The workers there are known as Layer.

== Examples ==
- Loreley, a well known slate hill on the Rhine
- Tholey, parish and abbey in the northern Saarland
- Theley, a village in the parish of Tholey
- the Koblenz quarter of Lay
- Kaiserlei, a quarter in the city of Offenbach, named after a rock above the River Main
- the Rabenlay is a hill in the Siebengebirge range, at the foot of which was found the double grave of Oberkassel.
- the Rabenlay is a shallows in the Rhine at river kilometre 548.5-549.0 near Oberwesel
- Mendiger Ley, basalt mine
- Leybucht near Norden (East Frisia)
- Plästerlegge ("raining slate rock"), waterfall near the Bestwig village of Wasserfall
- Geierlay in (Mörsdorf Hunsrück), Germany's second longest suspension bridge
- Erpeler Ley A basalt rock face above the Rhine, which figured importantly during the March 1945 WWII Battle of Remagen, it overlooking the Ludendorff Bridge
