= List of bridges in Germany =

This list of bridges in Germany lists bridges of particular historical, scenic, architectural or engineering interest. Road and railway bridges, viaducts, aqueducts and footbridges are included.

== Historical and architectural interest bridges ==
	Name	Distinction	Length	Type	Carries Crosses	Opened	Location	Land	Ref.
1	Mainz Aqueduct demolished	Total length : 9 km (30,000 ft) (a large part is aerial)		Masonry	Aqueduct	79	Mainz; 49°59′22.2″N 8°15′13.7″E	Rhineland-Palatinate	
2	Aqueduct-bridge over the Swist (Eifel Aqueduct) demolished	One of the longest Roman Empire aqueduct Total length : 130 km (430,000 ft) (a large part is underground)	1,400 m (4,600 ft)	Masonry; 295 arches	Aqueduct; Swist	80	Rheinbach–Meckenheim; 50°38′28″N 7°00′47″E	North Rhine-Westphalia	
3	Vussem Aqueduct-bridge (Eifel Aqueduct) demolished		75 m (246 ft)	Masonry; 13 arches	Aqueduct	80	Mechernich; 50°33′53.3″N 6°40′06.6″E	North Rhine-Westphalia	(Note: The remains of the Vussem Aqueduct-bridge are a partial reconstruction built in 1960 to show how the original must have looked.)
4	Roman Bridge (Trier)	Oldest standing bridge in Germany; Roman Monuments in Trier; World Heritage Site; Cultural monument	198 m (650 ft)	Masonry; 8 arches	Moselle	2nd century	Trier; 49°45′6.8″N 6°37′35.7″E	Rhineland-Palatinate	(Note: The piles of this Roman bridge are mostly original and were built between 144 and 152 AD, the vaults will be rebuilt in 1716-1718. The existence of a wooden bridge is however attested from -17 BC. J.C. Other older Roman bridges existed but did not survive until our days.)
5	Drusus Bridge	Cultural monument	126 m (413 ft)	Masonry; 6 semi-circular arches (7 originally)	Road bridge Nahe (Rhine)	11th century	Bingen am Rhein; 49°57′36.3″N 7°53′34.9″E	Rhineland-Palatinate	
6	Stone Bridge (Regensburg)	Old town of Regensburg; World Heritage Site; Cultural monument	330 m (1,080 ft)	Masonry; 14 arches	Danube	1146	Regensburg; 49°1′21″N 12°5′50.1″E	Bavaria	
7	Old Lahn Bridge	Cultural monument	104 m (341 ft)	Masonry; 7 arches	Lahn	13th century	Wetzlar; 50°33′20.9″N 8°29′56.4″E	Hesse	
8	Krämerbrücke	One of the few remaining inhabited bridge	125 m (410 ft)	Masonry; 6 semi-circular arches	Breitstrom; Gera (river)	1325	Erfurt; 50°58′43.4″N 11°1′51.6″E	Thuringia	
9	Tauber Bridge	Cultural monument		Masonry; 2 levels	Road bridge Tauber	1330	Rothenburg ob der Tauber; 49°22′22″N 10°10′34.5″E	Bavaria	
10	Alte Nahebrücke	One of the few remaining inhabited bridge	135 m (443 ft)	Masonry; 8 arches originally	Road bridge Nahe (Rhine)	1332	Bad Kreuznach; 49°50′40.6″N 7°51′28.9″E	Rhineland-Palatinate	
11	Old Town Hall (Bamberg)	Town of Bamberg; World Heritage Site; Cultural monument		Masonry; 3 arches	Regnitz	1387	Bamberg; 49°53′29.3″N 10°53′13″E	Bavaria	
12	Oberer Henkersteg		56 m (184 ft)	Masonry; 2 segmental arches	Pegnitz (river)	14th century	Nuremberg; 49°27′12.2″N 11°4′24″E	Bavaria	
13	Baldwin Bridge	Rhine Gorge; World Heritage Site; Cultural monument	246 m (807 ft)	Masonry; 8 arches	Moselle	1429	Koblenz; 50°21′47.5″N 7°35′35.6″E	Rhineland-Palatinate	
14	Fronveste (Nürnberg)			Masonry; 1 segmental arch	Pegnitz (river)	1494	Nuremberg; 49°27′14.9″N 11°4′14.4″E	Bavaria	
15	Röhrensteg Zwickau		62 m (203 ft)	Covered bridge Wood	Footbridge; Zwickauer Mulde	1535	Zwickau; 50°42′27.6″N 12°30′20″E	Saxony	
16	Old Sauer Bridge (Echternach)	Germany–Luxembourg border Span : 28 m (92 ft)	91 m (299 ft)	Masonry; 4 arches	Road bridge Sauer	16th century	Echternacherbrück–Echternach; 49°48′45.9″N 6°25′35.1″E	Rhineland-Palatinate; Luxembourg	
17	Holzbrücke Bad Säckingen	Germany–Switzerland border Cultural monument	204 m (669 ft)	Covered bridge Wood	Footbridge; Rhine	1700	Bad Säckingen–Stein; 47°33′5.1″N 7°57′5.3″E	Baden-Württemberg; Switzerland	
18	Old Main Bridge	Cultural monument	185 m (607 ft)	Masonry; 8 arches	Main (river)	1703	Würzburg; 49°47′34.9″N 9°55′33.8″E	Bavaria	
19	Forbach Wooden Bridge	Span : 37.8 m (124 ft)	45 m (148 ft)	Covered bridge Wood	Murg	1776	Forbach; 48°40′40″N 8°21′40.7″E	Baden-Württemberg	
20	Wünschendorf Wooden Bridge		71 m (233 ft)	Covered bridge Wood	White Elster	1786	Wünschendorf/Elster; 50°47′41.2″N 12°5′25″E	Thuringia	
21	Old Bridge (Heidelberg)	Cultural monument	200 m (660 ft)	Masonry; 9 arches	Neckar	1788	Heidelberg; 49°24′51.7″N 8°42′34.5″E	Baden-Württemberg	
22	Rheinbrücke Rheinau–Altenburg	Germany–Switzerland border	80 m (260 ft)	Covered bridge Wood	Road bridge Rhine	1806	Jestetten–Rheinau; 47°38′51.5″N 8°36′10.3″E	Baden-Württemberg; Switzerland	
23	Diessenhofen–Gailingen Rhine Bridge	Germany–Switzerland border	87 m (285 ft)	Covered bridge Wood	Rhine	1816	Gailingen am Hochrhein–Diessenhofen; 47°41′26.8″N 8°45′3.5″E	Baden-Württemberg; Switzerland	
24	Buchfart Wooden Bridge		43 m (141 ft)	Covered bridge Wood	Road bridge Ilm (Thuringia)	1818	Buchfart; 50°55′16.6″N 11°19′57.1″E	Thuringia	
25	Unterregenbach Arch Bridge	Span : 40 m (130 ft)	60 m (200 ft)	Covered bridge Wood	Jagst	1821	Langenburg; 49°16′28.6″N 9°50′7.6″E	Baden-Württemberg	
26	Bastei Bridge		76 m (249 ft)	Masonry; 5 arches	Footbridge; Bastei	1826	Rathen; 50°57′42.7″N 14°4′22.7″E	Saxony	
27	Göltzsch Viaduct	Largest brick-built bridge in the world Height : 78 m (256 ft)	578 m (1,896 ft)	Masonry; 5 levels, bricks	Leipzig–Hof railway Göltzsch river	1851	Netzschkau; 50°37′21.9″N 12°14′38.5″E	Saxony	
28	Elster Viaduct	Second largest brick-built bridge Cultural monument	279 m (915 ft)	Masonry; 2 levels, bricks	Leipzig–Hof railway White Elster	1851	Pöhl; 50°33′11.3″N 12°10′2.6″E	Saxony	
29	King Louis Bridge	Cultural monument		Truss; Wooden Howe truss	Footbridge (formerly Ludwig South-North Railway); Iller	1851	Kempten; 47°42′55.7″N 10°19′18.9″E	Bavaria	
30	Bride's Bridge (Neuschwanstein)	Panorama on the Neuschwanstein Castle		Cantilever; Steel	Footbridge; Pöllat Gorge	1866	Füssen; 47°33′17.9″N 10°44′58″E	Bavaria	
31	Rakotzbrücke	Devil’s Bridge; Cultural monument	35 m (115 ft)	Masonry; 1 semi-circular arch	Footbridge; Kromlau Azalea and Rhododendron Park	1870	Gablenz; 51°32′10.8″N 14°38′25.7″E	Saxony	
32	Theodor Heuss Bridge (Mainz-Wiesbaden)		475 m (1,558 ft)	Arch; Steel deck arch	Road bridge Bundesstraße 40; Rhine	1885	Mainz–Wiesbaden; 50°00′23.8″N 8°13′36.6″E	Rhineland-Palatinate; Hesse	
33	Loschwitz Bridge		280 m (920 ft)	Cantilever; Steel	Road bridge Elbe	1893	Dresden; 51°03′12.3″N 13°48′36.4″E	Saxony	
34	Müngsten Bridge	Highest railway bridge in Germany; Height : 107 m (351 ft); Span : 170 m (560 ft)	465 m (1,526 ft)	Arch; Steel truss deck arch	Wuppertal-Oberbarmen–Solingen railway Wupper	1897	Remscheid–Solingen; 51°09′37.3″N 7°08′01.1″E	North Rhine-Westphalia	
35	Gutach Valley Bridge	Span : 64 m (210 ft)	141 m (463 ft)	Masonry; 6 arches (1 main segmental)	Höllentalbahn (Black Forest); Wutach (river)	1900	Titisee-Neustadt; 47°53′0.5″N 8°15′8.1″E	Baden-Württemberg	
36	Oberbaum Bridge	Cultural monument	124 m (407 ft)	Masonry; 2 levels	Road bridge U1 and U3 (Berlin U-Bahn); Spree (river)	1902	Berlin (Friedrichshain-Kreuzberg); 52°30′6.1″N 13°26′44.8″E	Berlin	
37	Kaiserbrücke, Mainz		789 m (2,589 ft)	Arch; Steel through arch	Mainz rail bypass Rhine	1904	Mainz–Wiesbaden; 50°01′20.9″N 8°15′13.3″E	Rhineland-Palatinate; Hesse	
38	Peace Bridge (Plauen)	Longest stone arch bridge span in Europe; Span : 90 m (300 ft)	133 m (436 ft)	Masonry; 2 arches (1 pseudo-elliptical main arch), phyllite	Road bridge Syrabach	1905	Plauen; 50°29′56.2″N 12°7′35.6″E	Saxony	
39	Rendsburg High Bridge		2,486 m (8,156 ft)	Truss; Steel; Transporter bridge	Neumünster–Flensburg railway Kiel Canal	1913	Rendsburg; 54°17′36.4″N 9°40′57.7″E	Schleswig-Holstein	
40	Sonnborn Railway Bridge	Span : 66 m (217 ft)	120 m (390 ft)	Masonry; 1 pseudo-elliptical main arch	Düsseldorf–Elberfeld railway Wupper	1914	Wuppertal; 51°14′30.3″N 7°6′11.6″E	North Rhine-Westphalia	
41	Hohenzollern Bridge		409 m (1,342 ft)	Arch; Steel tied arch	Köln Hauptbahnhof; Köln Messe/Deutz station Rhine	1948; 1959; 1987	Cologne; 50°56′29.2″N 6°57′56.3″E	North Rhine-Westphalia	
42	Kocher Viaduct	Highest bridge in Germany; Tallest bridge pier in the world until 2004; Height : 185 m (607 ft); Span : 138 m (453 ft)	1,128 m (3,701 ft)	Box girder Prestressed concrete	Bundesautobahn 6 European route E50; Kocher	1979	Braunsbach; 49°10′39.6″N 9°47′09.1″E	Baden-Württemberg	
43	Essing Wooden Bridge		190 m (620 ft)	Stressed ribbon	Footbridge; Rhine–Main–Danube Canal	1986	Essing; 48°56′17.7″N 11°46′51″E	Bavaria	
44	Magdeburg Water Bridge	Largest Water Bridge in Europe	918 m (3,012 ft)	Truss; Steel	Mittelland Canal; Elbe	2002	Magdeburg; 52°13′51.1″N 11°42′04.7″E	Saxony-Anhalt	
45	Drachenbrücke		165 m (541 ft)	Beam bridge Steel; V-shaped legs	Footbridge; L639 Cranger Street	2008	Recklinghausen; 51°33′55.8″N 7°10′29.1″E	North Rhine-Westphalia	
46	Geierlay	Span : 360 m (1,180 ft)	360 m (1,180 ft)	Suspension; Steel	Footbridge; Mörsdorfer Bach	2015	Mörsdorf–Sosberg; 50°05′24.0″N 7°20′28.4″E	Rhineland-Palatinate	
47	Titan RT	Span : 458 m (1,503 ft)	483 m (1,585 ft)	Suspension; Steel	Footbridge; Rappbode	2017	Elbingerode–Thale; 51°44′26.6″N 10°53′39.3″E	Saxony-Anhalt	

== Major road and railway bridges ==
This table presents the structures with spans greater than 200 meters (non-exhaustive list).

	Name	Span	Length	Type	Carries Crosses	Opened	Location	Land	Ref.
1	Emmerich Rhine Bridge	500 m (1,600 ft)	1,228 m (4,029 ft)	Suspension; Steel truss deck, steel pylons 151+500+151	Bundesstraße 220; Rhine	1965	Emmerich am Rhein; 51°49′44.8″N 6°13′35″E	North Rhine-Westphalia	
2	New Neuenkamp Rhine Bridge under construction	380 m (1,250 ft)	802 m (2,631 ft)	Cable-stayed; Steel box girder deck, steel pylons 48+2x70+380+3x60	Bundesautobahn 40; European route E34; Rhine	2026	Duisburg; 51°26′12.1″N 6°42′44.7″E	North Rhine-Westphalia	
3	Cologne Rodenkirchen Bridge	378 m (1,240 ft)	567 m (1,860 ft)	Suspension; Steel girder deck, steel pylons 94+378+94	Bundesautobahn 4 Rhine	1954	Cologne; 50°53′58.7″N 6°59′26″E	North Rhine-Westphalia	
4	Flehe Bridge	368 m (1,207 ft)	1,148 m (3,766 ft)	Cable-stayed; Steel box girder deck, 1 concrete pylon 358+59+2x60	Bundesautobahn 46; Rhine	1979	Düsseldorf–Neuss; 51°11′7.5″N 6°46′30.5″E	North Rhine-Westphalia	
5	Neuenkamp Rhine Bridge	350 m (1,150 ft)	777 m (2,549 ft)	Cable-stayed; Steel box girder deck, steel pylons 50+2x45+350+105+60	Bundesautobahn 40; European route E34; Rhine	1971	Duisburg; 51°26′13.2″N 6°42′45.3″E	North Rhine-Westphalia	
6	Wesel Lower Rhine Bridge	335 m (1,099 ft)	775 m (2,543 ft)	Cable-stayed; Steel box girder deck, 1 concrete pylon	Bundesstraße 58; Rhine	2009	Wesel; 51°38′43.5″N 6°36′16.1″E	North Rhine-Westphalia	
7	Köhlbrand Bridge	325 m (1,066 ft)	3,618 m (11,870 ft)	Cable-stayed; Steel box girder deck, steel pylons 97+325+97	Bundesautobahn 7 Köhlbrand	1974	Hamburg; 53°31′18.5″N 9°56′19″E	Hamburg	
8	Rheinkniebrücke	319 m (1,047 ft)	561 m (1,841 ft)	Cable-stayed; Steel girder deck, 1 steel pylon	Road bridge Rhine	1969	Düsseldorf; 51°13′15.2″N 6°45′49.8″E	North Rhine-Westphalia	
9	Mülheim Bridge, Cologne	315 m (1,033 ft)	683 m (2,241 ft)	Suspension; Steel girder deck, steel pylons 85+315+85	Bundesstraße 51; Rhine	1951	Cologne; 50°57′51.2″N 6°59′44.1″E	North Rhine-Westphalia	
10	Beeckerwerth Bridge	310 m (1,020 ft)	1,030 m (3,380 ft)	Cable-stayed; Steel box girder deck, steel pylons	Bundesautobahn 42; Rhine	1990	Duisburg; 51°28′51.2″N 6°40′49.8″E	North Rhine-Westphalia	
11	Severin Bridge	302 m (991 ft)	691 m (2,267 ft)	Cable-stayed; Steel girder deck, 1 steel pylon 302+151	Bundesstraße 55; Rhine	1961	Cologne; 50°55′50.3″N 6°58′1.6″E	North Rhine-Westphalia	
12	Deggenau Danube Bridge	290 m (950 ft)	888 m (2,913 ft)	Cable-stayed; Steel box girder deck, 1 steel pylon	Bundesautobahn 3 European route E56; Danube	1975	Deggendorf; 48°48′31.3″N 12°58′14.6″E	Bavaria	
13	Kurt Schumacher Bridge (Mannheim)	288 m (945 ft)	433 m (1,421 ft)	Cable-stayed; Steel box girder deck, 1 steel pylon 288+60+65	Bundesstraße 44; Rhine	1971	Mannheim–Ludwigshafen; 49°29′22.9″N 8°26′44.7″E	Baden-Württemberg; Rhineland-Palatinate	(Note: The length given only takes into account the main bridge, central span(s) and shore span(s), approach viaducts are not counted.)
14	Düsseldorf Airport Bridge	287 m (942 ft)	1,286 m (4,219 ft)	Cable-stayed; Steel box girder deck, steel pylons 2x63+287+2x63	Bundesautobahn 44; Rhine	2002	Düsseldorf–Meerbusch; 51°16′41.3″N 6°42′16.9″E	North Rhine-Westphalia	
15	Friedrich Ebert Bridge (Duisburg)	285 m (935 ft)		Suspension; Self-anchored, steel girder deck, steel pylons	L287 Rheindeichstraße; Rhine	1954	Duisburg; 51°27′22.4″N 6°43′24.9″E	North Rhine-Westphalia	
16	Leverkusen Rhine Bridge	280 m (920 ft)	1,068 m (3,504 ft)	Cable-stayed; Steel box girder deck, steel pylons 106+280+106	Bundesautobahn 1 Rhine	1965	Leverkusen; 51°2′2.7″N 6°57′39.2″E	North Rhine-Westphalia	
17	Leverkusen Rhine Bridge (2023) under construction	280 m (920 ft)	1,068 m (3,504 ft)	Cable-stayed; Steel box girder deck, steel pylons 2x77+280+2x77	Bundesautobahn 1 Rhine	2023; 2027	Leverkusen; 51°2′2.7″N 6°57′39.2″E	North Rhine-Westphalia	
18	Friedrich Ebert Bridge (Bonn)	280 m (920 ft)	520 m (1,710 ft)	Cable-stayed; Steel box girder deck, steel pylons 120+280+120	Bundesautobahn 565; Rhine	1967	Bonn; 50°45′23.7″N 7°5′59.1″E	North Rhine-Westphalia	
19	Speyer Rhine Bridge (A61)	275 m (902 ft)	456 m (1,496 ft)	Cable-stayed; Steel box girder deck, 1 steel pylon 275+2x61+59	Bundesautobahn 61; European route E31; Rhine	1975	Speyer–Hockenheim; 49°20′30.3″N 8°28′22.1″E	Rhineland-Palatinate; Baden-Württemberg	
20	Froschgrundsee Viaduct	270 m (890 ft)	798 m (2,618 ft)	Arch; Concrete deck arch	Nuremberg–Erfurt high-speed railway Froschgrundsee	2010	Rödental; 50°21′16.9″N 11°1′20.8″E	Bavaria	
21	Grümpen Viaduct	270 m (890 ft)	1,104 m (3,622 ft)	Arch; Concrete deck arch	Nuremberg–Erfurt high-speed railway Grümpen stream	2011	Grümpen; 50°23′20.5″N 11°2′3.7″E	Thuringia	
22	Neckar Viaduct, Weitingen	263 m (863 ft)	918 m (3,012 ft)	Box girder Steel; 2 underslung girder spans 234+3x134+263	Bundesautobahn 81; European route E41; Neckar	1977	Horb am Neckar; 48°26′56.1″N 8°45′57.1″E	Baden-Württemberg	
23	Theodor Heuss Bridge (Düsseldorf)	260 m (850 ft)	1,271 m (4,170 ft)	Cable-stayed; Steel girder deck, steel pylons 108+260+108	Bundesstraße 7 Rhine	1957	Düsseldorf; 51°14′48.8″N 6°45′33.1″E	North Rhine-Westphalia	
24	Zoo Bridge	259 m (850 ft)	597 m (1,959 ft)	Box girder Steel; Twin bridges 259+145+120	Bundesstraße 55a Rhine	1966	Cologne; 50°57′16.6″N 6°58′30.9″E	North Rhine-Westphalia	
25	Oberkassel Bridge	258 m (846 ft)	615 m (2,018 ft)	Cable-stayed; Steel box girder deck, 1 steel pylon	Landesstraße 392; Rhine	1973	Düsseldorf; 51°13′53.7″N 6°46′9.9″E	North Rhine-Westphalia	
26	Obere Argen Viaduct	258 m (846 ft)	730 m (2,400 ft)	Cable-stayed; Steel box girder deck, 1 steel pylon Mix cable-stayed and underslung girder	Bundesautobahn 96; Argen	1990	Wangen im Allgäu; 47°38′29.8″N 9°44′44.2″E	Baden-Württemberg	
27	Brücke der Solidarität	255 m (837 ft)	822 m (2,697 ft)	Arch; Steel tied arch Bow-string bridge	L237 Moerser Straße; Rhine	1950	Duisburg; 51°24′54.7″N 6°44′20.1″E	North Rhine-Westphalia	
28	Rees-Kalkar Rhine Bridge	255 m (837 ft)	982 m (3,222 ft)	Cable-stayed; Steel girder deck, steel pylons 104+255+104	Bundesstraße 67; Rhine	1967	Rees–Kalkar; 51°45′16.1″N 6°22′37″E	North Rhine-Westphalia	
29	Wilde Gera Viaduct	252 m (827 ft)	552 m (1,811 ft)	Arch; Concrete deck arch	Bundesautobahn 71; Wilde Gera	2000	Gräfenroda–Oberhof; 50°42′53.6″N 10°47′14.3″E	Thuringia	
30	Krefeld-Uerdingen Bridge	250 m (820 ft)	860 m (2,820 ft)	Suspension; Self-anchored, steel truss deck, steel pylons 125+250+125	Bundesstraße 288; Rhine	1936	Duisburg–Krefeld; 51°20′58.6″N 6°39′32.4″E	North Rhine-Westphalia	
31	Hamm Railway Bridge	250 m (820 ft)	813 m (2,667 ft)	Arch; Steel tied arch Bow-string bridge Truss; 250+135	Mönchengladbach–Düsseldorf railway Rhine	1987	Düsseldorf–Neuss; 51°12′31″N 6°43′53.3″E	North Rhine-Westphalia	
32	Fehmarn Sound Bridge	248 m (814 ft)	963 m (3,159 ft)	Arch; Steel tied arch Bow-string bridge	Bundesstraße 207; European route E47; Fehmarn Sound	1963	Großenbrode–Fehmarn; 54°24′6.1″N 11°6′45″E	Schleswig-Holstein	
33	Brunsbüttel Bridge	237 m (778 ft)	2,831 m (9,288 ft)	Truss; Steel	Bundesstraße 550; Kiel	1983	Brunsbüttel; 53°55′18.7″N 9°11′46.9″E	Schleswig-Holstein	
34	South Bridge (Koblenz)	236 m (774 ft)	442 m (1,450 ft)	Box girder Steel; 103+236+103	Bundesstraße 327; Rhine	1975	Koblenz; 50°19′57.5″N 7°35′38.5″E	Rhineland-Palatinate	
35	Raiffeisen Bridge	235 m (771 ft)	1,519 m (4,984 ft)	Cable-stayed; Steel box girder deck,1 steel pylon 235+38+212	Bundesstraße 256; Rhine	1978	Neuwied–Weißenthurm; 50°25′17″N 7°27′28.5″E	Rhineland-Palatinate	
36	Konrad Adenauer Bridge (Bonn)	230 m (750 ft)	480 m (1,570 ft)	Box girder Steel; Twin bridges 125+230+125	Bundesautobahn 562; Rhine	1972	Bonn; 50°43′4.3″N 7°8′37″E	North Rhine-Westphalia	
37	Three Countries Bridge	229 m (751 ft)	250 m (820 ft)	Arch; Steel through arch	Footbridge; Rhine	2007	Weil am Rhein–Huningue; 47°35′29.5″N 7°35′23.8″E	Baden-Württemberg; France	(Note: The tripoint border between Germany, France and Switzerland is situated about 100 metres (330 ft) south of the Three Countries Bridge, so the bridge is on the France–Germany border but doesn't cross exactly the France–Switzerland border.)
38	Kyll Viaduct	223 m (732 ft)	645 m (2,116 ft)	Arch; Concrete deck arch	Bundesautobahn 60; European route E42; Kyll	1999	Wilsecker; 50°1′11.8″N 6°34′29.1″E	Rhineland-Palatinate	
39	Rade Bridge	221 m (725 ft)	1,497 m (4,911 ft)	Beam bridge Steel; 112+221+112	Bundesautobahn 7 European route E45; Kiel Canal	1972	Rade bei Rendsburg; 54°19′50.4″N 9°43′40″E	Schleswig-Holstein	
40	Kaiserlei Bridge	220 m (720 ft)	220 m (720 ft)	Arch; Steel tied arch Bow-string bridge	Bundesautobahn 661; Main (river)	1964	Frankfurt; 50°6′40.2″N 8°44′7.7″E	Hesse	
41	Moselle Viaduct	218 m (715 ft)	935 m (3,068 ft)	Box girder Steel	Bundesautobahn 61; Moselle	1972	Winningen; 50°18′53.5″N 7°29′39.4″E	Rhineland-Palatinate	
42	High Moselle Bridge	209 m (686 ft)	1,702 m (5,584 ft)	Box girder Steel; 105+131+157+209 +196+138+170+157 +144+131+118	Bundesstrasse 50; Moselle	2019	Zeltingen-Rachtig; 49°58′9.6″N 7°0′1.2″E	Rhineland-Palatinate	
43	Bendorf Bridge	208 m (682 ft)	1,029 m (3,376 ft)	Box girder Prestressed concrete Twin bridges 71+208+71	Bundesautobahn 48; European route E44; Rhine	1965	Koblenz–Bendorf; 50°24′37.2″N 7°34′29.2″E	Rhineland-Palatinate	
44	Main Viaduct, Nantenbach	208 m (682 ft)	694 m (2,277 ft)	Truss; Steel	Hanover–Würzburg high-speed railway Main (river)	1993	Neuendorf; 50°1′49.7″N 9°39′7.7″E	Bavaria	
45	Schwabelweis Danube Bridge	207 m (679 ft)	518 m (1,699 ft)	Arch; Steel tied arch Bow-string bridge	Odessa-Ring; Danube	1981	Regensburg; 49°1′22″N 12°8′26.9″E	Bavaria	
46	Josef Frings Bridge	206 m (676 ft)	780 m (2,560 ft)	Box girder Steel; Twin bridges 103+206+103	Bundesstraße 1 Rhine	1951	Düsseldorf–Neuss; 51°11′55.5″N 6°43′53.1″E	North Rhine-Westphalia	
47	Schierstein Bridge (1962) demolished in 2018	205 m (673 ft)	1,281 m (4,203 ft)	Beam bridge Steel; 85+205+85; 70+170+70	Bundesautobahn 643; Rhine	1962	Mainz–Wiesbaden; 50°02′17.1″N 8°12′45.6″E	Rhineland-Palatinate; Hesse	
48	New Schierstein Bridge	205 m (673 ft)	1,285 m (4,216 ft)	Box girder Steel; Twin bridges 102+205+102+89 +102+205+102	Bundesautobahn 643; Rhine	2017; 2023	Mainz–Wiesbaden; 50°02′17.1″N 8°12′44.3″E	Rhineland-Palatinate; Hesse	
49	Pierre Pflimlin Bridge	205 m (673 ft)	957 m (3,140 ft)	Box girder Prestressed concrete 139+205+121	L98 road Rhine	2002	Offenburg–Strasbourg; 48°29′29.1″N 7°46′10.1″E	Baden-Württemberg; France	
50	Weisenau Bridge	204 m (669 ft)	831 m (2,726 ft)	Box girder Steel; 132+204+74	Bundesautobahn 60; Rhine	1962	Mainz–Ginsheim-Gustavsburg; 49°58′27.9″N 8°19′17.1″E	Rhineland-Palatinate; Hesse	

}}

== Notes and references ==
- Notes
- Nicolas Janberg. "International Database for Civil and Structural Engineering". Structurae.com.
- Others references

== See also ==
- Transport in Germany
- Roads in Germany
- Rail transport in Germany
- Geography of Germany
- de:Liste der längsten Straßenbrücken in Deutschland (in German) - List of longest road bridges in Germany
- de:Liste der längsten Eisenbahnbrücken in Deutschland (in German) - List of longest railway bridges in Germany
- de:Liste der höchsten Brücken in Deutschland (in German) - List of highest bridges in Germany
- List of bridges by river: de:Alster, de:Danube, de:Elbe, de:Hinterrhein, de:Lahn, de:Main, de:Moselle, de:Neckar, de:Saale, de:Rhine, de:Ruhr, de:Vorderrhein, de:Wupper, de:Wied
- List of bridges by city: :de:Berlin, de:Bremerhaven, de:Eschweiler, Hamburg, de:Munich
- List of bridges by type: de:Moveable bridge
- List of bridges by period: de:historic Rhine bridges, de:medieval stone bridges
