= Leyendecker =

Leyendecker (or Leiendecker, Leydecker, Leydhecker, Layendecker, etc) is an occupational surname, meaning 'slate roofer' in Middle High German and Middle Dutch.

As a surname, it can refer to:

- Frank Xavier Leyendecker (1877–1924), American illustrator (younger brother of J. C. Leyendecker)
- Hans Leyendecker (b.1949), German journalist
- Joseph Christian Leyendecker (1874–1951), American illustrator (older brother of F.X. Leyendecker)
- Mai Thi Leiendecker, married name of Mai Thi Nguyen-Kim (b. 1987), German chemist and journalist
- Ulrich Leyendecker (1946-2018), German composer of contemporary classical music

It may also refer to

- "Leyendecker", a track by Battles from their 2007 album, Mirrored

See also

- Lyendecker Lake
- Lydekker
