= Main Viaduct, Nantenbach =

Railway bridge in Germany

Coordinates: 50°01′50″N 9°39′08″E

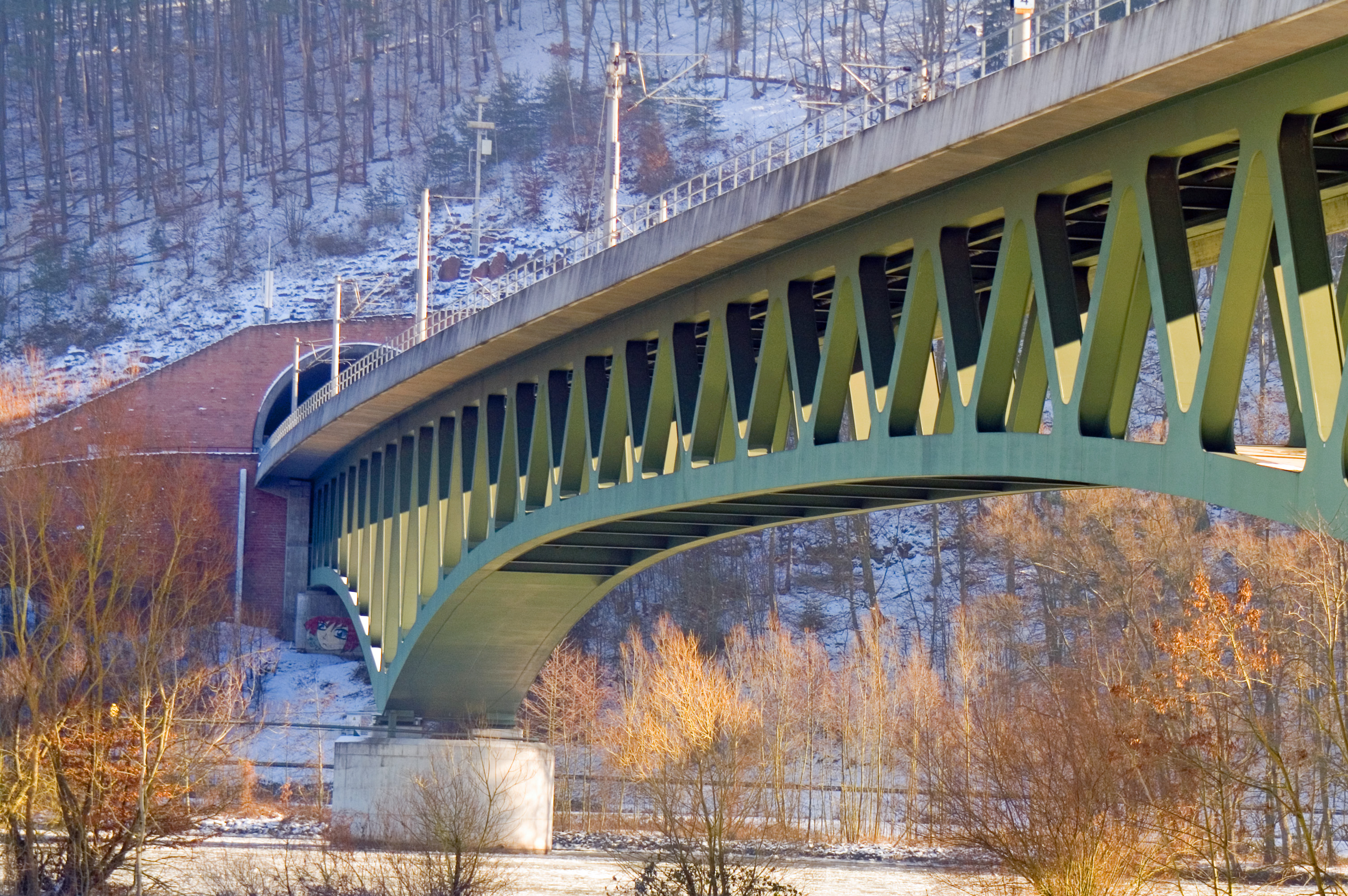
Bridge and entrance to the Schönrain Tunnel

The Main Viaduct is a double track railway bridge across the River Main at Nantenbach, Germany. It is a continuous truss girder bridge with a main span that is 208m long, with a 12.5% slope and a radius of 2650m. The full length of the structure is 374.4m and the side spans are each 83.2m long.

== See also ==
- List of bridges in Germany
