= Geierlay =

German suspension bridge

Coordinates: 50°05′26″N 7°20′26″E

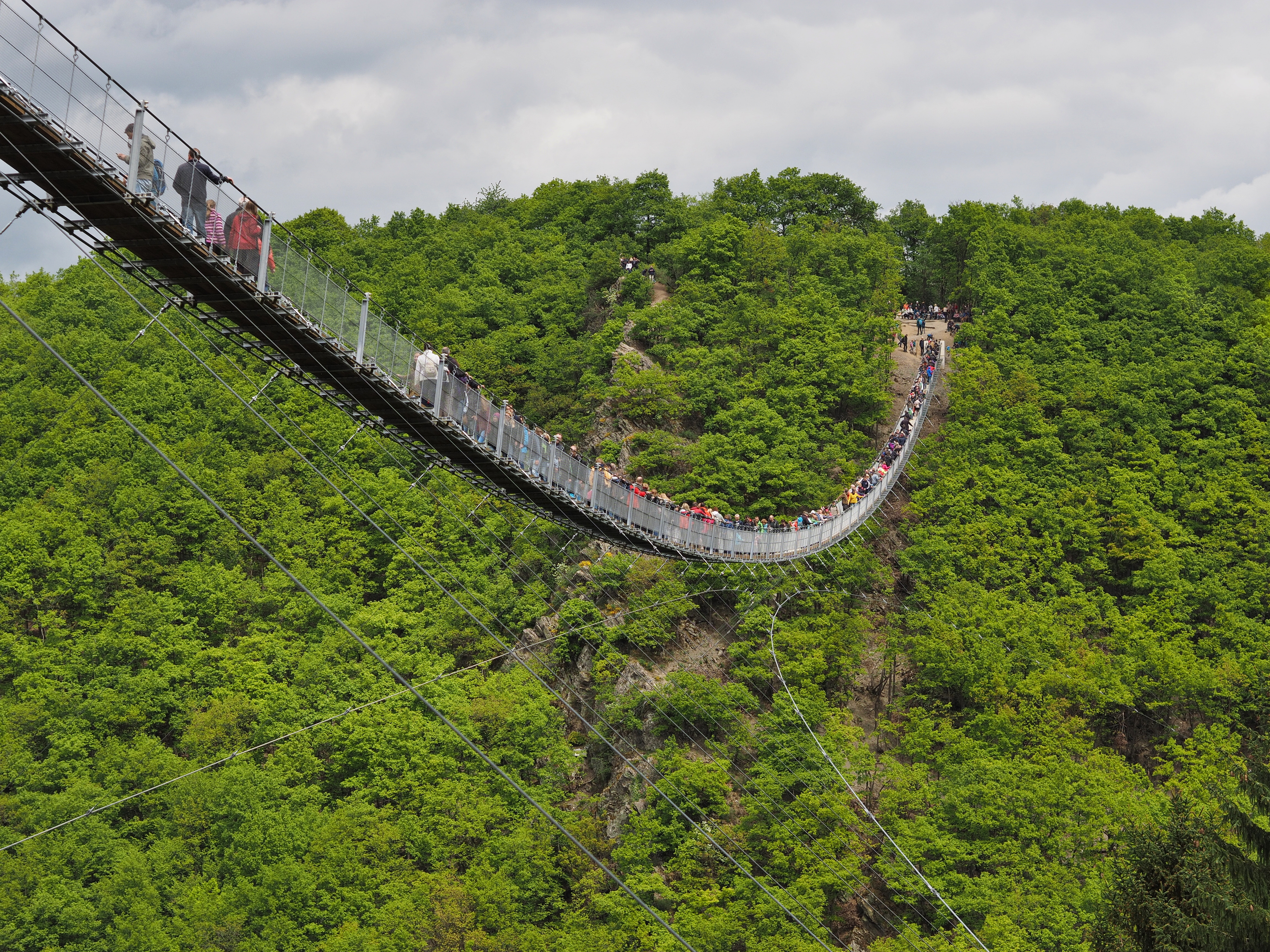
- The Geierlay crossing a valley
- Span range: 360 m
- Material: Wood, steel wire rope
- Movable: No

The Geierlay is a suspension bridge in the low mountain range of the Hunsrück in western Germany. It was opened in 2015. It has a span range of 360 metres (1,180 ft) and is up to 100 metres (330 ft) above ground. On both sides of the bridge are the villages of Mörsdorf and Sosberg. A stream named Mörsdorfer Bach runs through the valley below the bridge. The nearest city is Kastellaun 8 km eastwards. The state capital Mainz is 66 km towards east.

The bridge has a weight of 57 tons and can support 50 tons. It is a pedestrians only bridge. Until 2020, bridge was free for tourists. Due to the coronavirus pandemic, a fee of 5 euros per person was introduced for crossing the bridge. This fee has since been withdrawn; crossing is possible in both directions and is free of charge. Twenty per cent of all visitors visiting the bridge do not cross it. The bridge site is within the Top 100 sightseeing destinations in Germany.

Swiss Engineer Hans Pfaffen designed the bridge with similarities to Nepalese suspension bridges.

Since 2017 the Geierlay is only the second longest suspension rope bridge in Germany, after the Titan RT between Neuwerk (Oberharz am Brocken) and Wendefurth (Thale) in the Harz.

== See also ==
- List of bridges in Germany

== Notes ==
1. Day trip to Geierlay Suspension Bridge. Chasing Whereabouts. 16 October 2022.
