= Neckar Viaduct, Weitingen =

Road bridge in Germany

Coordinates: 48°26′56″N 8°45′57″E

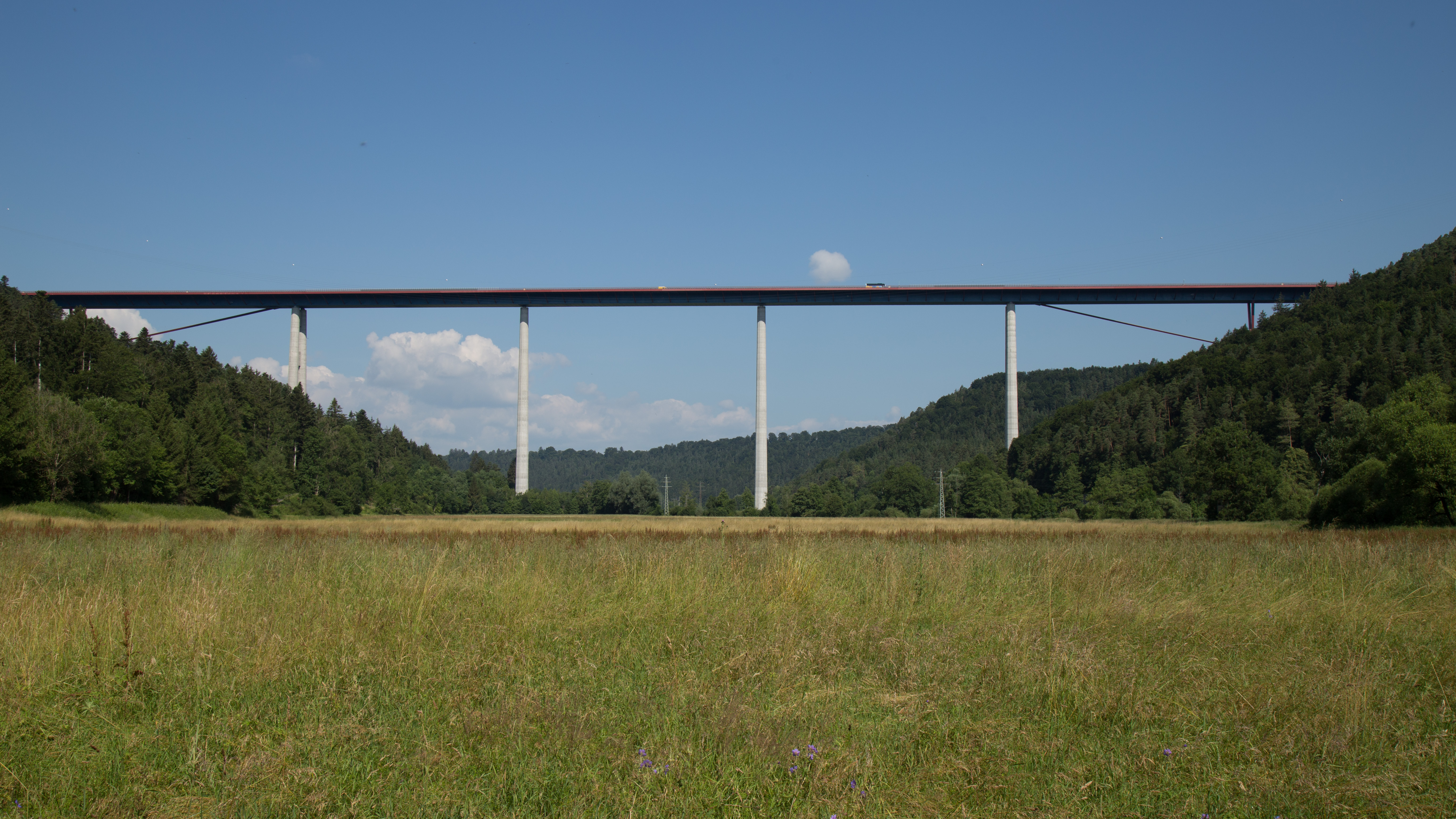

The Neckar Viaduct at Weitingen is a bridge that crosses the valley of the River Neckar, near the town Horb am Neckar. The bridge is an important part of motorway A81's section Stuttgart - Singen.

== Characteristics ==
=== Measurements ===
The bridge has an overall length of 900 meters, spans of 234-134-134-134-264 meters and a height of 125 meters above ground. The width of the bridge deck amounts to 31.5 meters.

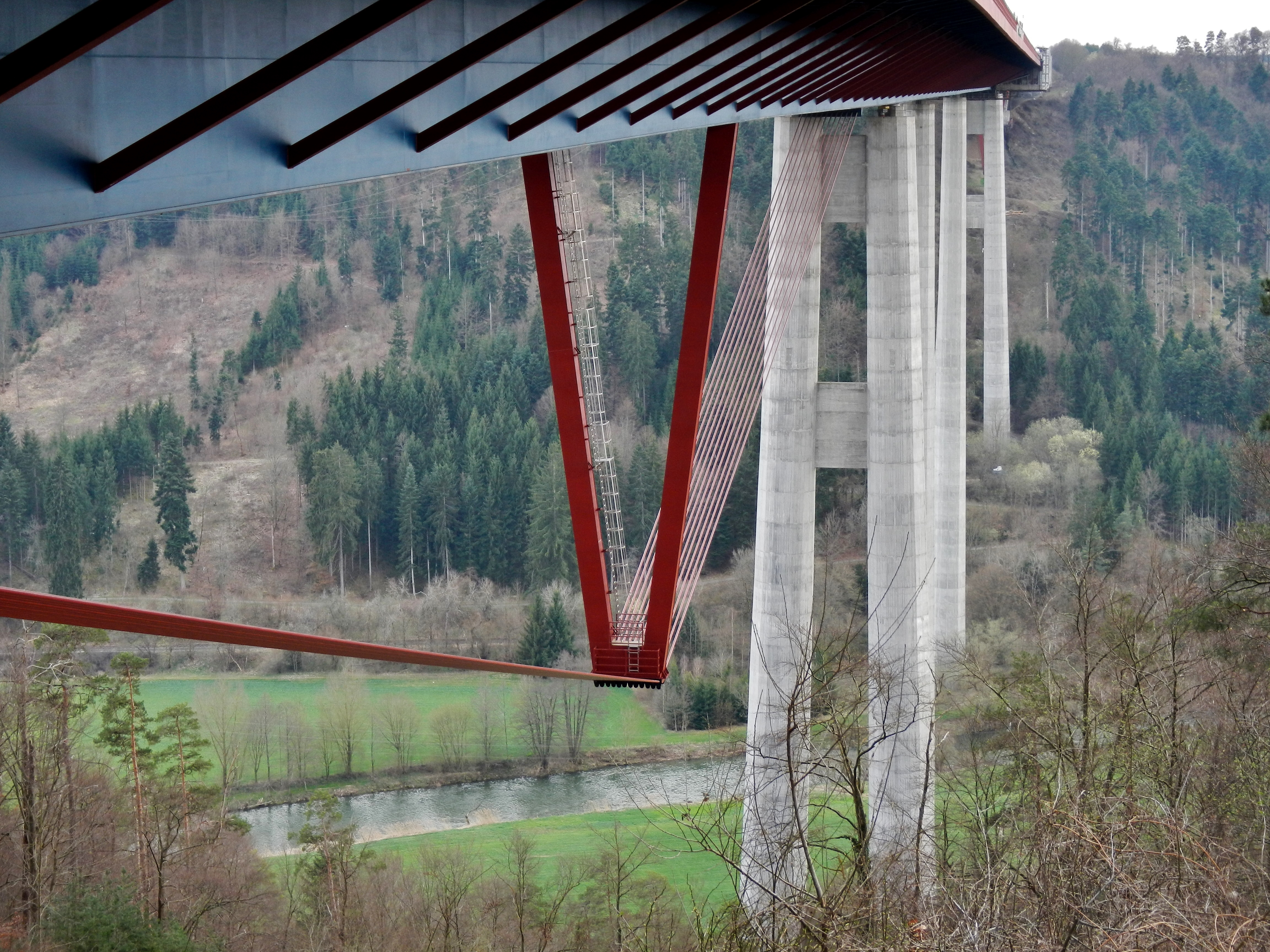
cable trussed girder

=== Construction ===
The structure is a steel box girder, which is 10 meters wide and 6.10 meters tall. A characteristic are the approach spans, which are cable trussed beams, to avoid pylons in the valley slopes. The south span is 264 meters long.

=== History ===
The bridge was handed over to the public in 1978. Directly east of the bridge is a 110 kV power line, hung on high anchor masts 70 meters high, crosses the Neckar Valley from Eutingen to St. Georgen.

== See also ==
- List of bridges in Germany
