= Emmerich Rhine Bridge =

Emmerich Rhine Bridge Rheinbrücke Emmerich
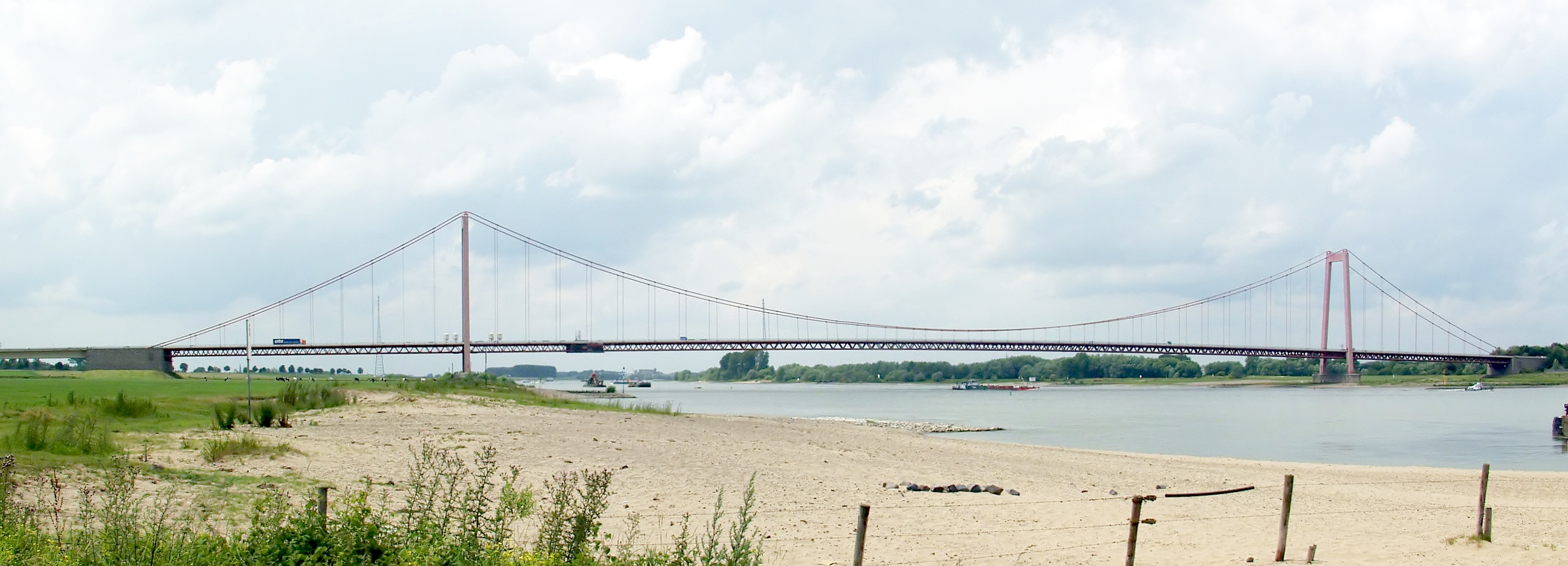
- View of the Emmerich Rhine Bridge
- Coordinates: 51°49′45″N 6°13′33″E
- Carries: 4 lanes of Bundesstraße B 220, 2 cycle lanes / sidewalks
- Crosses: Rhine
- Locale: Emmerich am Rhein, Germany
- Other name(s): Emmericher Rheinbrücke
- Maintained by: Landesbetrieb Straßenbau NRW, Niederlassung Wesel

Characteristics
- Design: suspension bridge
- Material: Steel
- Total length: 803 metres (2,635 ft)
- Width: 22.5 metres (74 ft)
- Longest span: 500 metres (1,600 ft)
- Clearance below: 30 metres (98 ft)

History
- Construction start: 2 May 1962
- Construction end: 1965
- Opened: September 3, 1965

Location of the bridge on the map of Germany

The Emmerich Rhine Bridge (German: 'Rheinbrücke Emmerich') is a suspension bridge located in Emmerich am Rhein, Germany. Completed in 1965, it has a main span of 500 metres (1,600 ft), crossing the Rhine, carrying the Bundesstraße B 220, the federal highway between Emmerich am Rhein and Kleve. It is the longest suspension bridge in Germany.

== Planning and construction ==
It was built from 1962 to 1965, after the design of Heinrich Bartmann and the planning of German civil engineer Hellmut Homberg. The bridge was opened for traffic in 1965. Pedestrian walkways and cycle paths run along both sides of the bridge, separated from the vehicular lanes. The two pylons are 76.7 metres (252 ft) high.

== Gallery ==
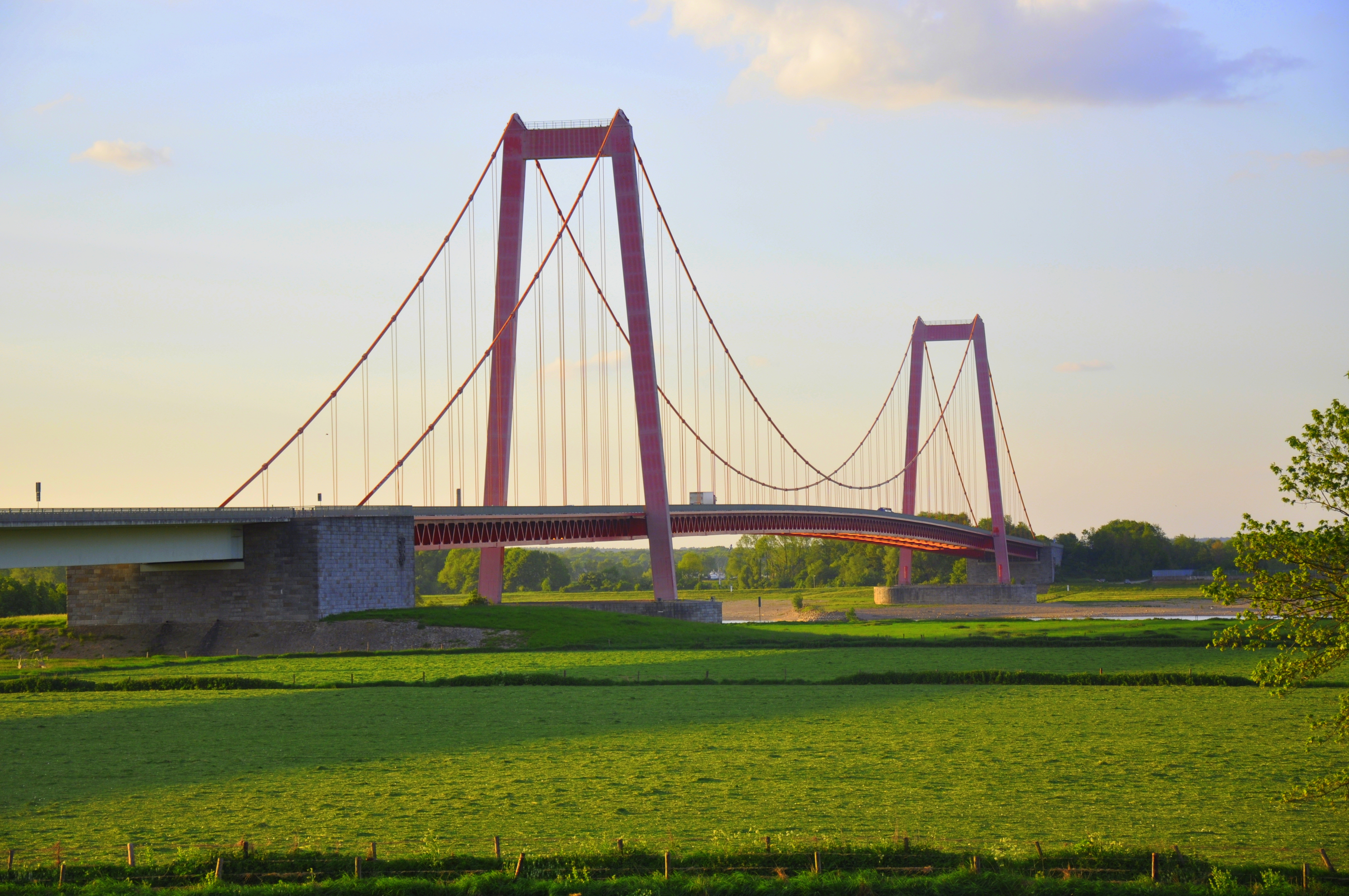
View from Kleve

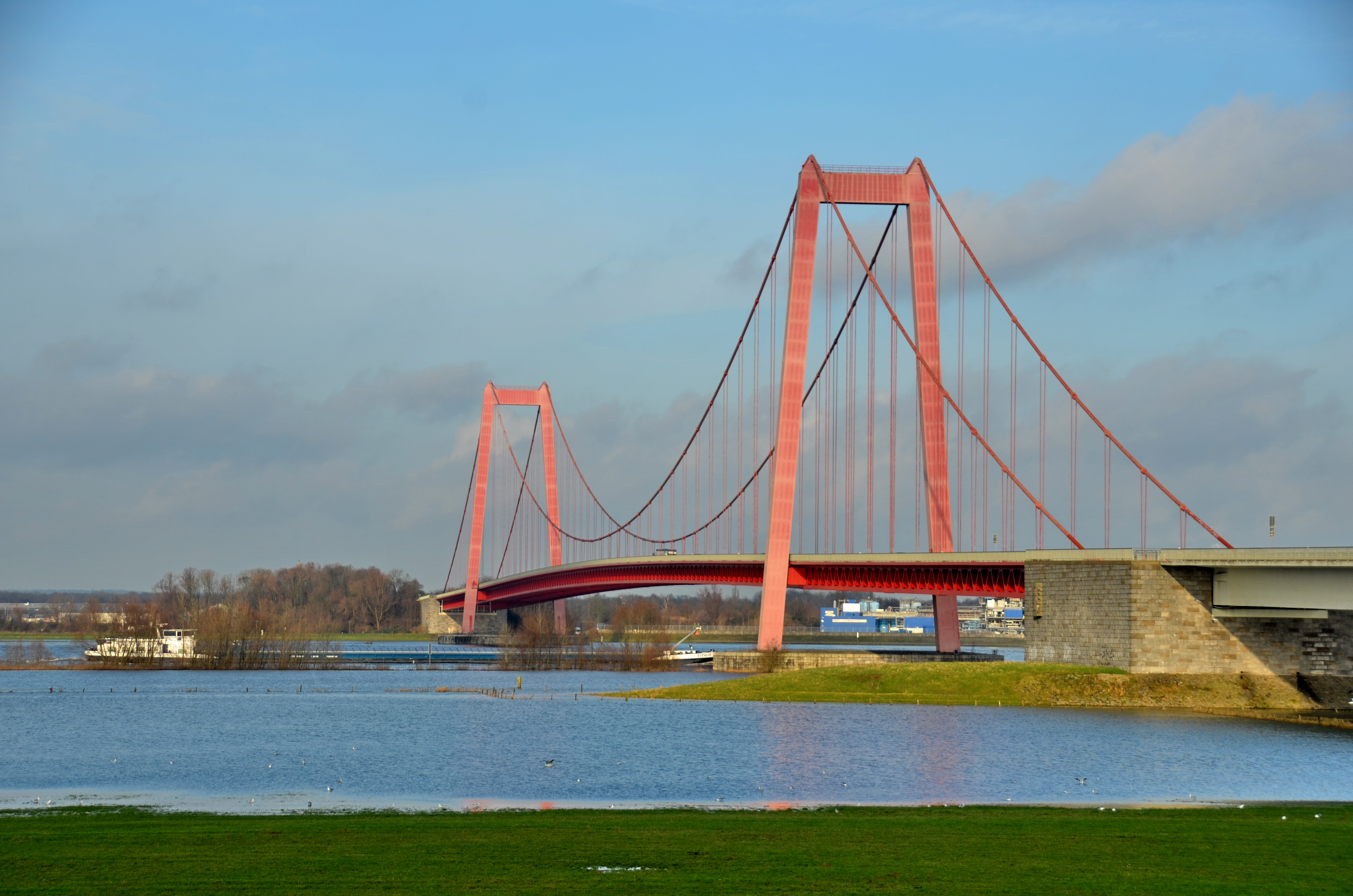
High waters

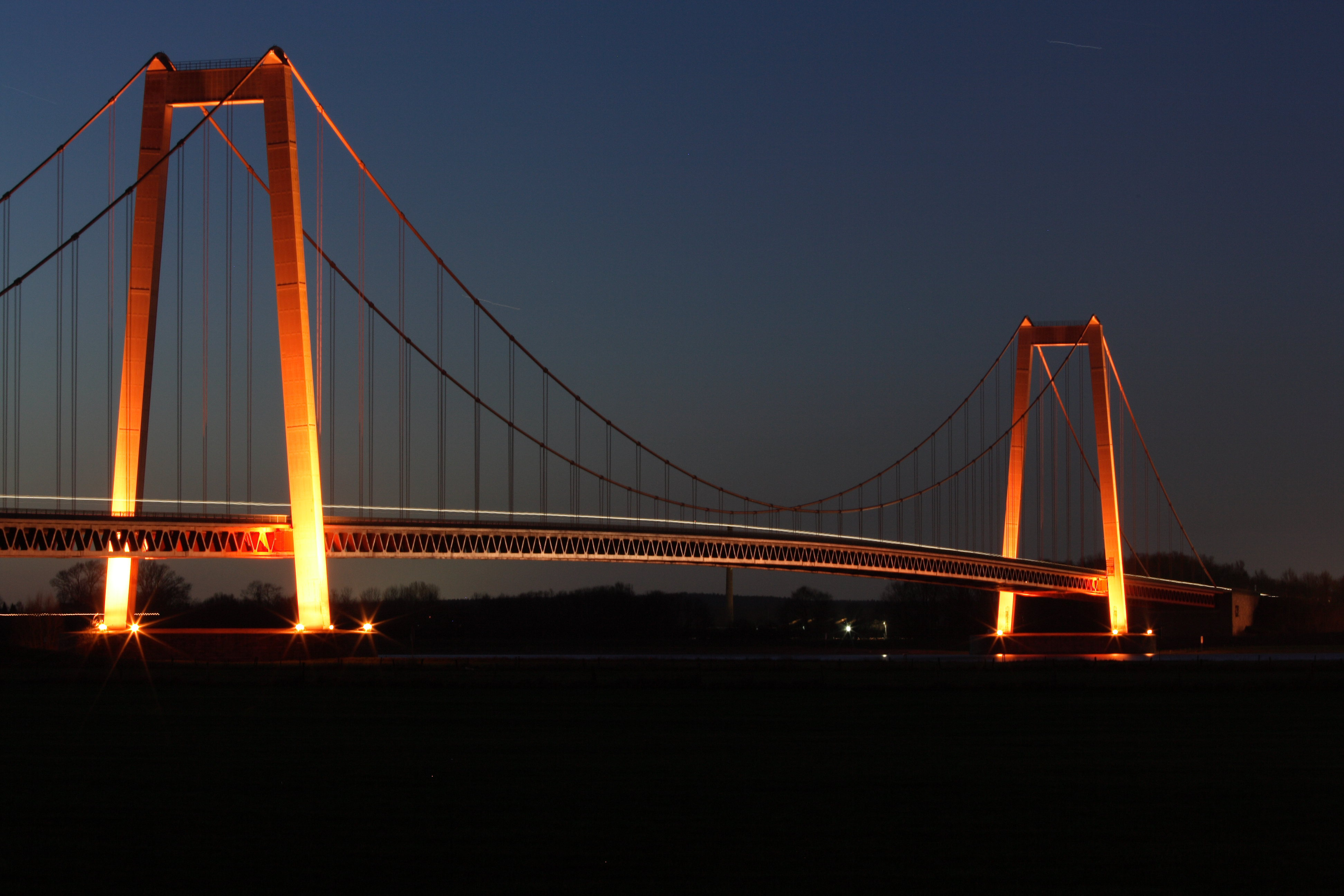
The bridge at night

== See also ==
- List of bridges in Germany
