= High Moselle Bridge =

Hochmoselbrücke
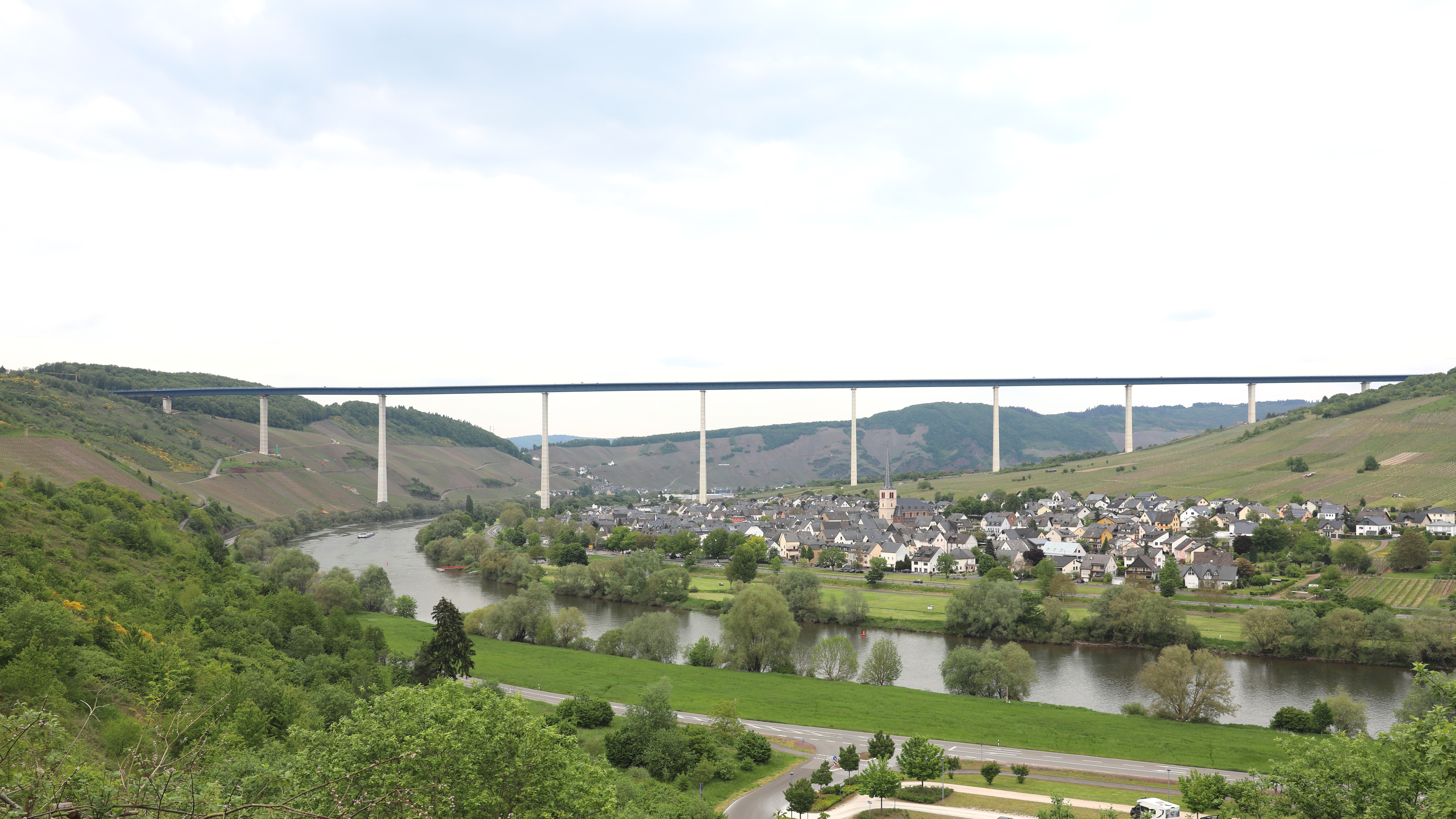
- The bridge in May 2019
- Coordinates: 49°58′07″N 7°00′00″E
- Carries: Motor vehicles
- Crosses: Moselle
- Locale: Zeltingen-Rachtig, Rheinland-Pfalz, Germany

Characteristics
- Design: Beam bridge
- Material: Structural steel, Concrete
- Total length: 1,702.4 metres (5,585 ft)
- Width: 29.0 metres (95.1 ft)
- Height: 158 metres (518 ft)
- Longest span: 209.5 metres (687 ft)
- No. of spans: 11

History
- Construction start: August 2011
- Construction end: 2019
- Replaces: Brücke Zeltingen (on present B50/B53)

Location
- Interactive map of Hochmoselbrücke

The Hochmoselbrücke (High Moselle Bridge) is a major road bridge, that crosses the valley of the Moselle south of Ürzig and north of Zeltingen-Rachtig in Rheinland-Pfalz, Germany. It was opened to the public traffic on 21 November 2019. The bridge – part of a road connection, the Hochmoselübergang (High Moselle Crossing), incorporating a rerouted stretch of Bundesstrasse (Federal Highway) 50 – is intended to facilitate the flow of traffic between Belgian and Dutch ports and the greater Frankfurt area.

== Construction ==
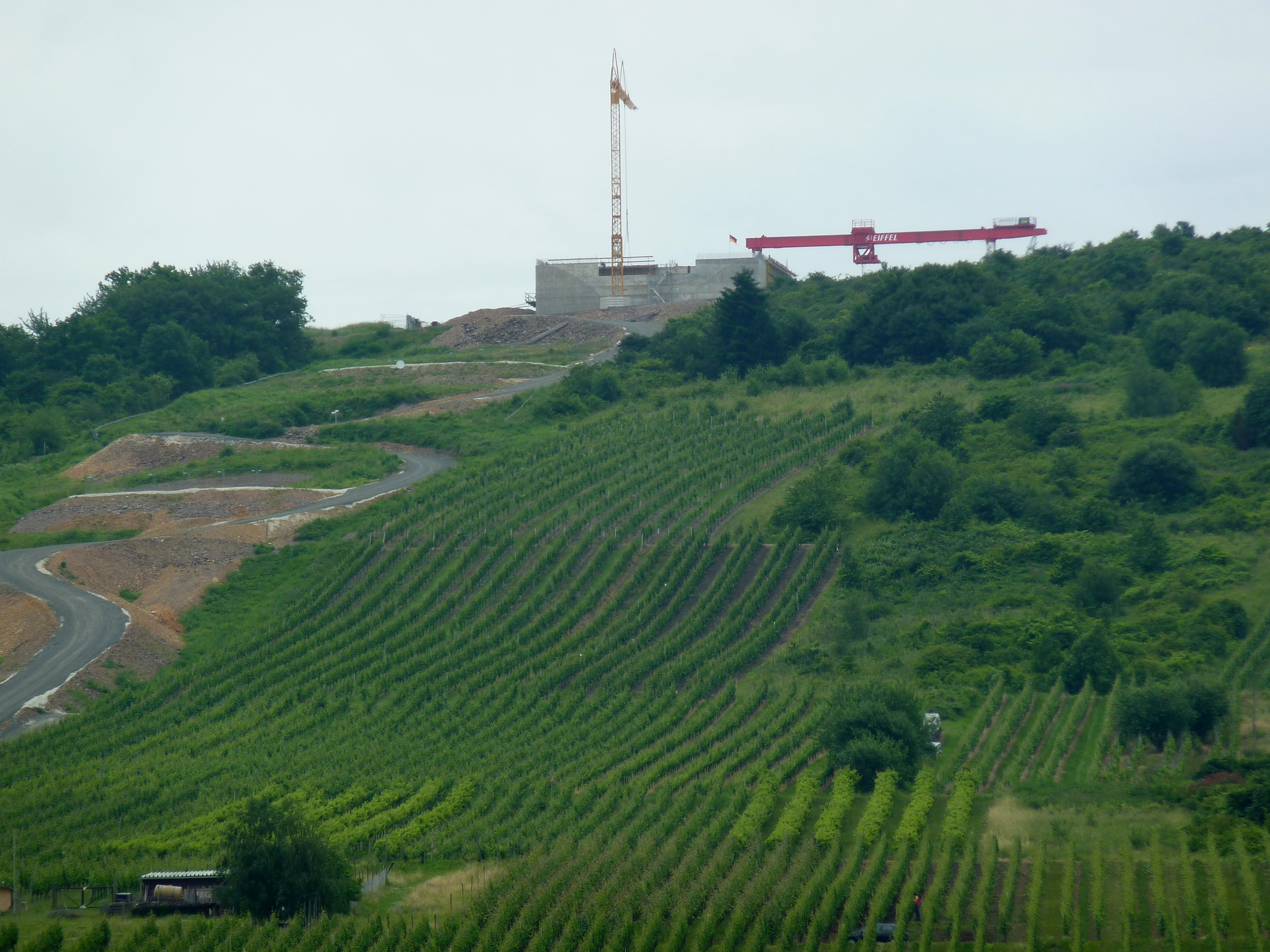
The Hochmoselbrücke under construction on 19 June 2012

A proposal for the highway and bridge was first made three decades ago for strategic reasons during the Cold War. The project was reactivated to link the Frankfurt area, specifically the Hahn airport, to the Belgian and Dutch harbors with updated plans drawn in the early 21st century.

The plan called for a 1702.4 m long steel box beam bridge that crosses the river at a maximum height of 158 m. The width of the bridge will be 29.0 m to allow four-lane traffic. Ten monolithic pylons made from concrete will support the bridge; their height varies between 15 and 150 m. The estimated costs are 270 million euros. Cost increases caused headlines. The costs of the entire project amount to at least 483 million euros, with the bridge accounting for 175 million euros. The project was completed in November 2019.

== Opposition ==
Opposition to the project is based on questions of its economical necessity and the negative ecological impact on the Mosel wine region. It was suggested that existing highway connections between the Belgian and Dutch harbors and Frankfurt were adequate, and the proposed highway with its bridge would not present a shortcut and thus would not be economically advantageous. More importantly, perhaps, was the concern that the "ungainly" bridge would destroy a historical cultural section of major significance within the Mosel wine region that some of the finest and most historic vineyards in Germany. A potential change in the local ecosystem would affect the premier riesling areas of the Wehlener Sonnenuhr, Graacher Himmelreich and Ürziger Würzgarten. International wine experts, among them Hugh Johnson, Jancis Robinson and Stuart Pigott, opposed the project and feared that the unique microclimate responsible for the Mosel rieslings would be impacted.

== Gallery ==
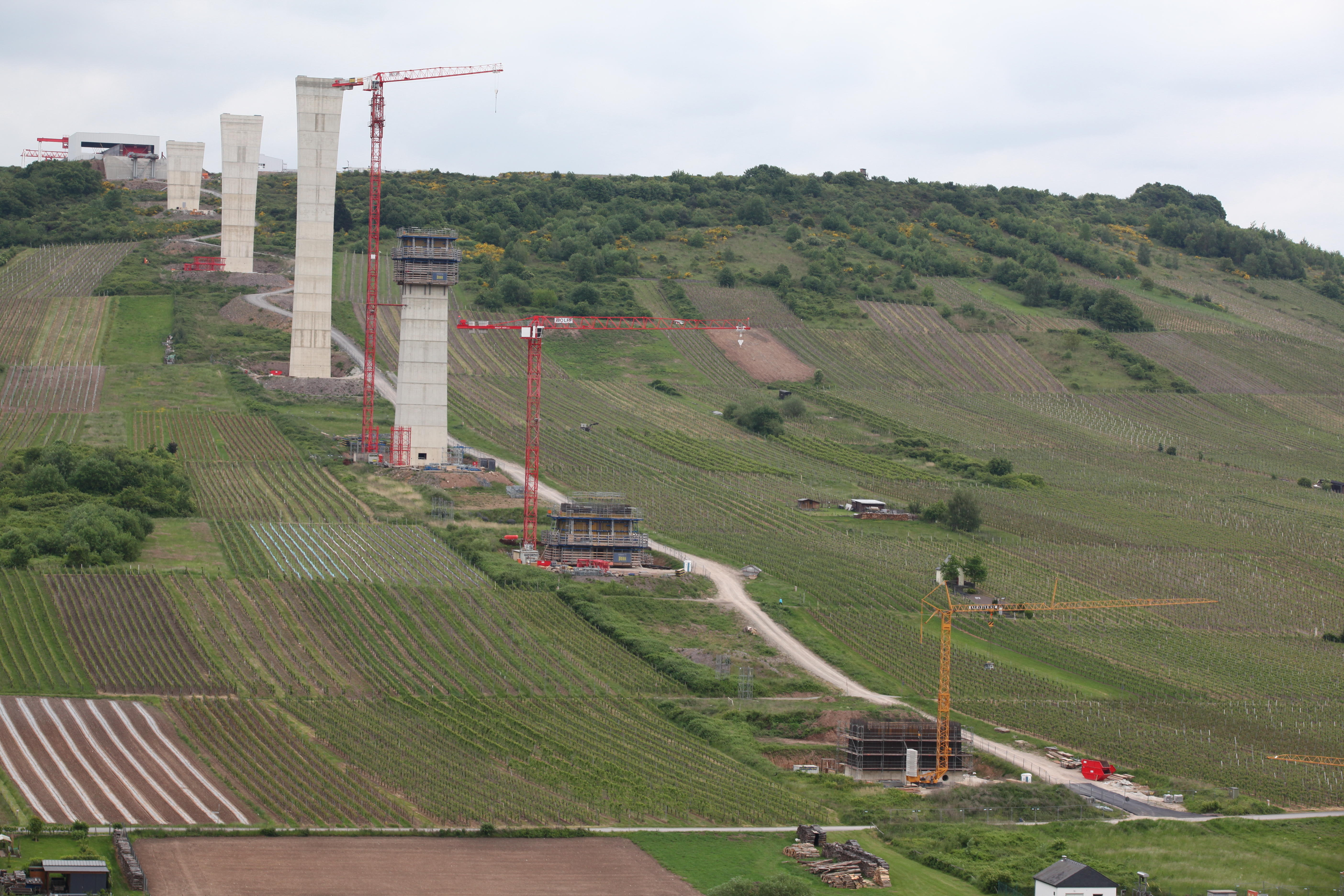
The bridge under construction in May 2014

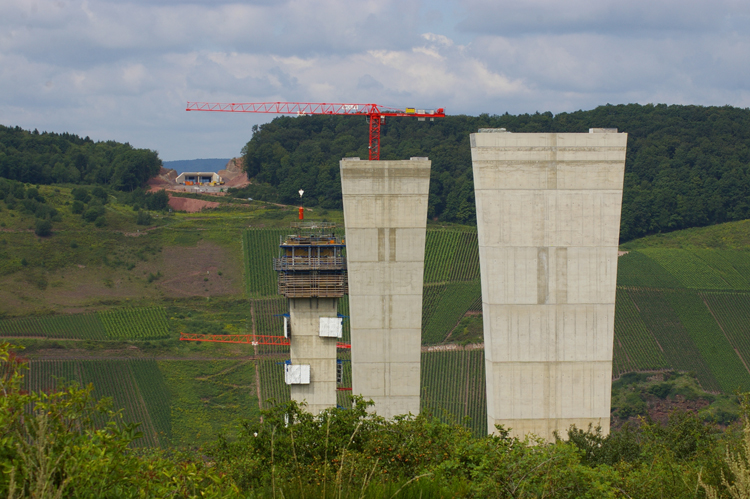
Eastern Bridge Piers, August 2014

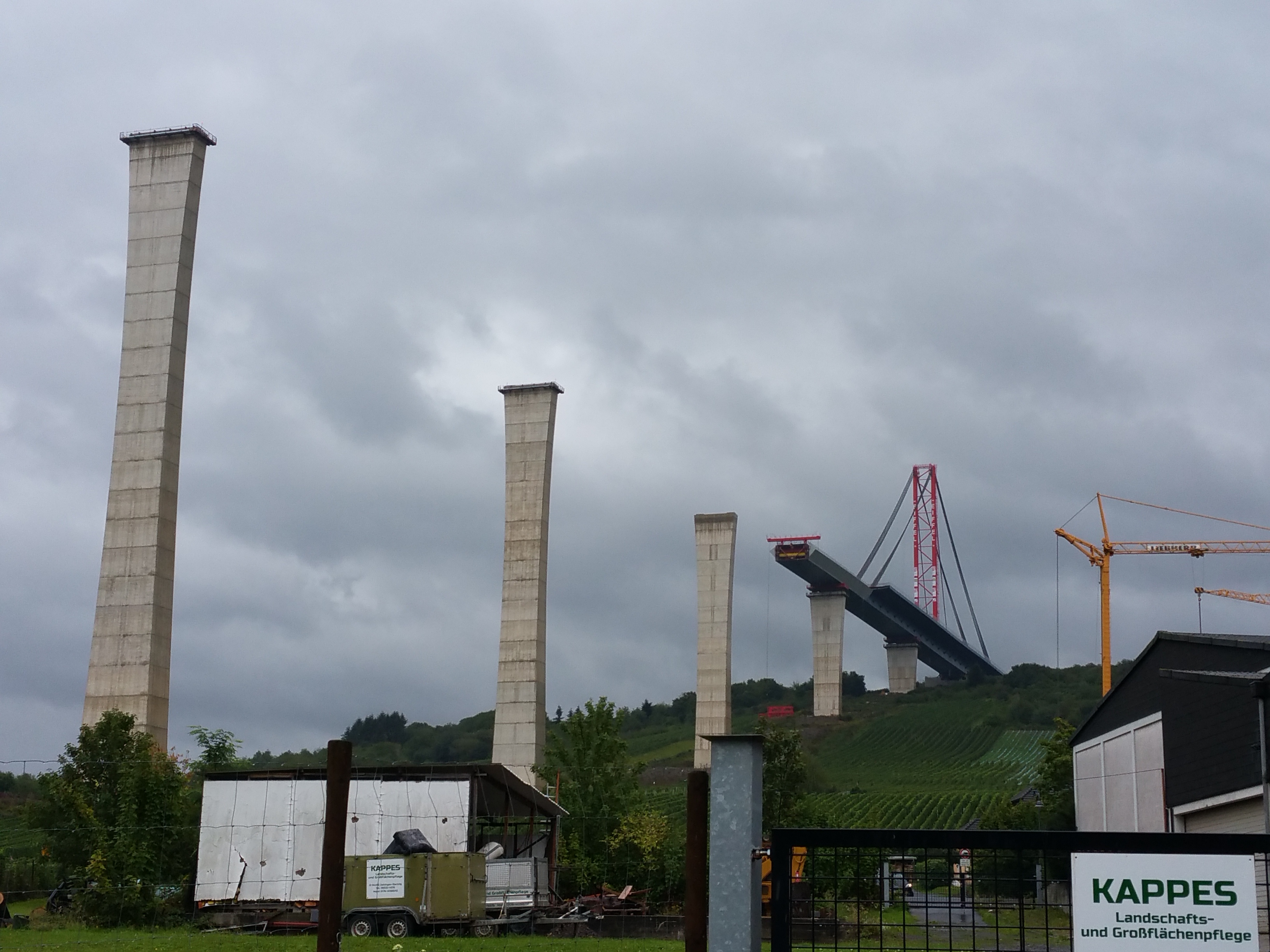
Installation of the roadway using auxiliary pylon, September 2015

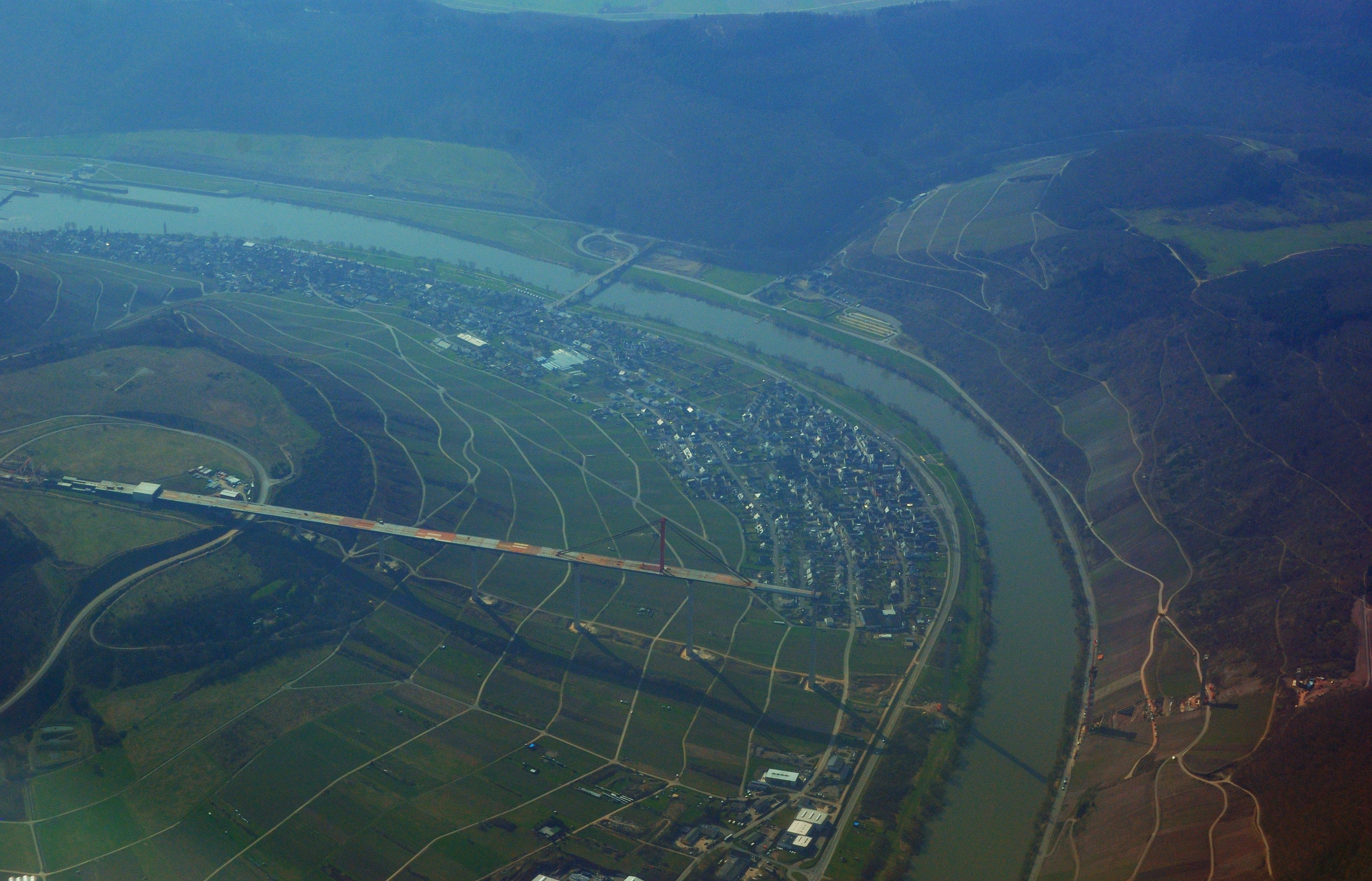
Construction site in March 2017

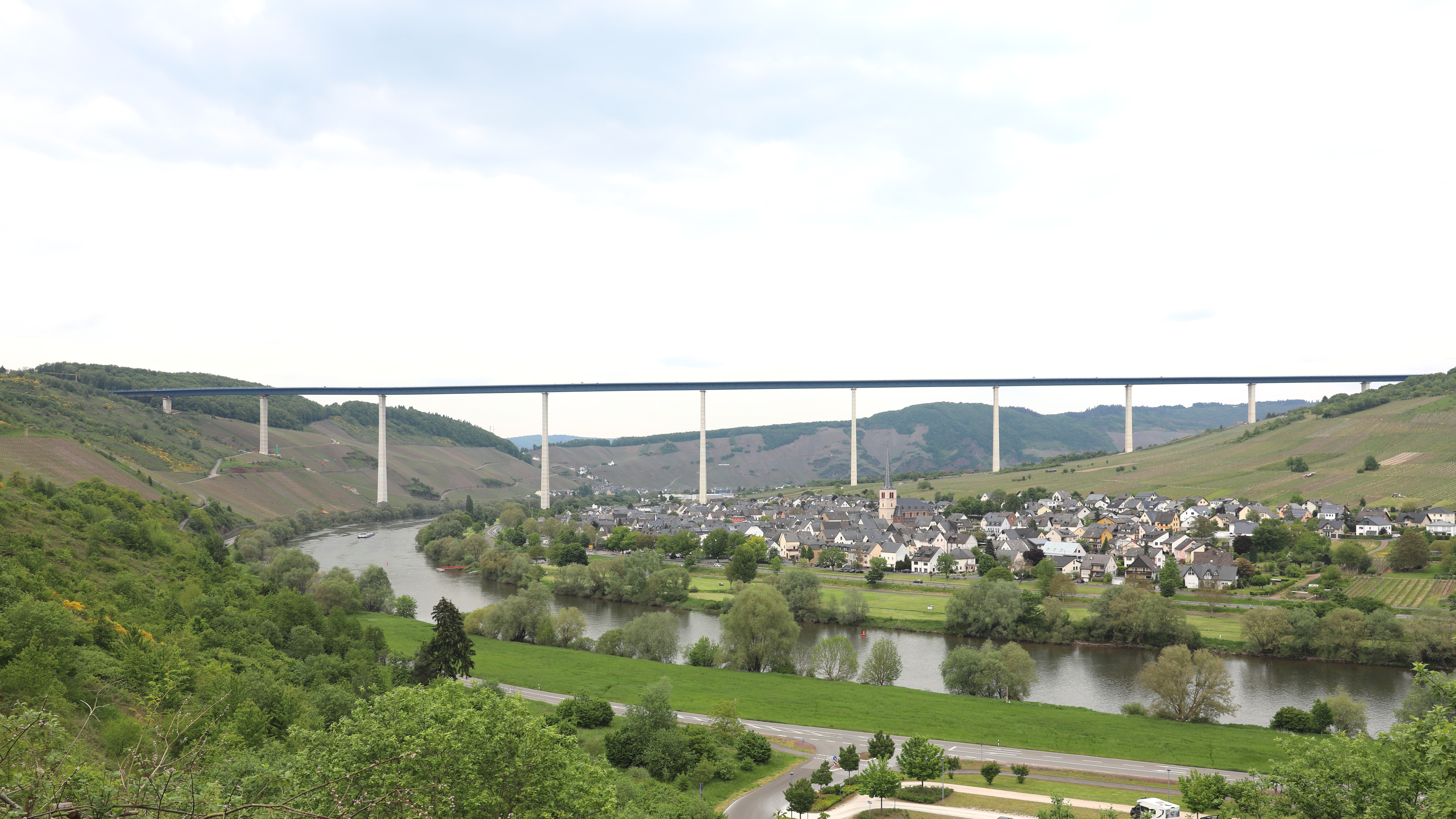
The bridge under construction in May 2019

== Literature ==
- Joachim Naumann: Strelasundquerung und Hochmoselübergang – Description of the project (in German) at the Brückbausymposium Dresden, 2003

== See also ==
- List of bridges in Germany
- List of highest bridges in the world
