= King Louis Bridge =

Wooden bridge in Germany

Coordinates: 47.7155°N 10.3218°E

The King Louis Bridge (German: König-Ludwig-Brücke) spans the River Iller in the town of Kempten in the Allgäu in southern Germany. It was built by the Royal Bavarian State Railways in the middle of the 19th century. After being reconstructed and changed in use several times, the bridge is currently closed due to an assumed instability.

== Location ==
The bridge crosses the stream cutoff of the River Iller in the South of Kempten. At the time the bridge was erected, the area surrounding the bridge was thinly populated. Geologically the construction is situated on sedimentation of the terminal moraine and recessional moraines of the Würm glaciation.

== History ==
The wooden bridge, which is divided in three sections, was built according to the Howe truss system, developed by American engineer William Howe, between 1847 and 1851. It has two parallel superstructures, with an overhead rail track for the Ludwig South-North Railway.

As the weight of trains and locomotives increased, only a single-tracked use was allowed. In the year 1880, an iron tension flange was incorporated in the middle section of the bridge to support it.

The construction was closed to trains in 1905, due to neighbouring concrete bridges (Obere Illerbrücken), which were almost finished. In 1911 the town of Kempten purchased the truss bridge and had it altered for road traffic. The Wehrmacht detonated the eastern part of the wooden superstructures in April 1945. The emerging gap was filled within the same year, using a wooden interim bridge, which was replaced by a composite construction in 1957.

After the construction of the new Kempten Station in 1969, one of the concrete bridges was closed to trains and altered for road traffic. Thus the town could reconvert their oldest bridge construction for pedestrians and cyclists in 1970. The bridge got its current name 'King Louis Bridge' in 1988, it is officially called 'Iller bridge I' by the conservation authorities. Before this, the bridge sections from 1957 were removed because of corrosion damage. Moreover, the middle and western sections of the northern wooden superstructure from 1986 were removed with a mobile crane and the western section shortened, rotated 180 degrees and placed in the eastern gap.

It is the only remaining bridge built according to the Howe truss structure and was the longest one of them in Germany, presumably worldwide. In 2005 the larch and oak wood of the bridge was protected from solar radiations with a net made of synthetic fibers, to counter wood deterioration. Originally the bridge was boarded to protect the wood against the elements. This prevision could however not prevent damage due to damp.

Over time the damage caused by the elements was so advanced, that the town decided to close the bridge for safety reasons in December 2013. A small number of people questioned the restoration of the bridge and demanded it being demolished. Kempten council decided on the restoration. The funds for this came from different contributors, amongst others the Federal Ministry of the Environment, Nature Conservation and Nuclear Safety. Since 1 September 2017, the neighboring road bridge was closed to transport the wood construction, which was fragmented in three pieces, with two tall cranes, at first to the bridge and then to a parking lot on the Kotterner road. The sections of the bridge were restored there in a temporary field workshop and prepared for the reconstruction. The middle section of the bridge – also the heaviest – was put back on its pillars after restoration on 17 July 2018.

== Construction ==
The bridge spans the 120 meters wide and 34 meters deep Iller valley with three beams, their span widths are 35, 52 and 26 meters (from West to East). The cross section of the wooden superstructure, two box-shaped constructions, which have respectively two girder supporting systems of 5.26 meters high and each one has an overhead and an underlying wind brace. These box-shaped constructions were supported about every 12 meters with a Saint Andrew's Cross. The girder supporting systems have three layers. Both outer layers are composed of two principal rafters, which rise to the middle of the bridge. The tie beams form the middle layer of the girder supporting system. The struts have a square cross section with 19 centimeters edge length and are made of stone and are finished with Swiss larch beam and oil-soaked oak. The horizontal beams (upper belt and lower belt) are each one composed of three parallel beams with the cross-section dimensions of 22 x 28 centimeters and are about 10.6 meters long. The iron hanger rods in pairs are arranged every 2.12 meters in the sections of the bridge. The cross-section dimensions vary between five centimeters near the bridge bearing and four centimeters in the middle section. This indicates that the calculations by Carl Culmann were made according to the Howe Truss. The hanger rods were produced by BHS-Sonthofen. The two box-shaped constructions support both rails of the railroad on joint crossbeams. The whole wooden construction leans on two pillars nearly 25 meters high and on two counter bearings, which were built of stone with a revetment of ashlar. Both counter bearings have pointed arch shaped sections, which were used as storage for firefighting water. The shelter of the wooden construction was reached from the sides with hanging timber panels by a "roof" made of double-walled wooden laggings and a tin revetment. This revetment was weatherproof (rain, sun) and resistant to flying sparks and ashes of steam trains.

Because of the increasing weight of the trains (in 1854 around 19, in 1859 around 30, in the 1890s around 60 tons) the bridge was later used single-tracked. In 1880 iron tension flanges (undervoltaged) were built in the middle section of the bridge, which were fixed to the upper beams, functioning as compression flange.

After the town Kempten bought the bridge in 1911, the rails were worn out and the original substructure of the railroad bridge was fitted with a roadway.

In 1986 the whole bridge underwent extensive reconstruction. The northern carrier, including all three parts, was removed, the western carrier was altered, rotated and replaced the composite structure from 1951 in the eastern section of the southern carrier. The wood of the northern middle pillar was removed. The hanging timber panels on the sides of the bridge were removed to reveal the carrier structure. The town of Kempten closed the bridge in December 2013. The carriers were wrapped in foil in a complex process to prevent further damage due to weather conditions. The stability of the bridge was inspected, the results lead to the elaboration of a restoration plan. The city council of Kempten agreed to restore the bridge in August 2015. At first, the estimated cost was 3.3 million euros, but the final cost was 5 million euros. Two thirds of the cost was funded by the National Program of Road Building. After the restoration, the bridge is to be opened to pedestrians and cyclists.

== Importance ==
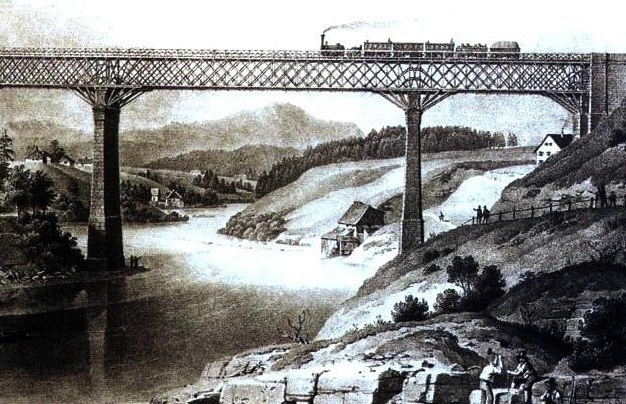
Drawing by Eberhard Emminger of the free-standing King Louis Bridge from approximately 1853

- The King Louis Bridge is a listed monument under the Bavarian Monument Protection Law.
- On April 20, 2012, the National Chamber of Engineers listed the construction as a historic landmark of German Engineering. The justification for the award was not only the fact that it is one of the oldest (>150 years) wooden railway bridges worldwide and the oldest Howe-bridge in Europe, but also the fact that the design of the bridge was based on calculation, rather than being empirically based. The bridge marks the transition to the theoretical-based constructions of the 19th century. "One can state, without exaggerating, that this is to be seen as a worldwide unique monument of structural engineering."

== Representation in arts ==
The construction signifies early Industrialisation and technological progress. Due to this, numerous lithographs and paintings of the bridge were produced at that time. This changed following the construction of the neighboring concrete bridge. The wooden construction was removed completely in contemporary images. Ever since its erection the bridge was planked, until 1986, when the timber panels, which blocked the sight of the truss-structure, were removed. However, a lot of the images of the monument - even images from the commissioning date- show the bridge with a visible truss-structure.

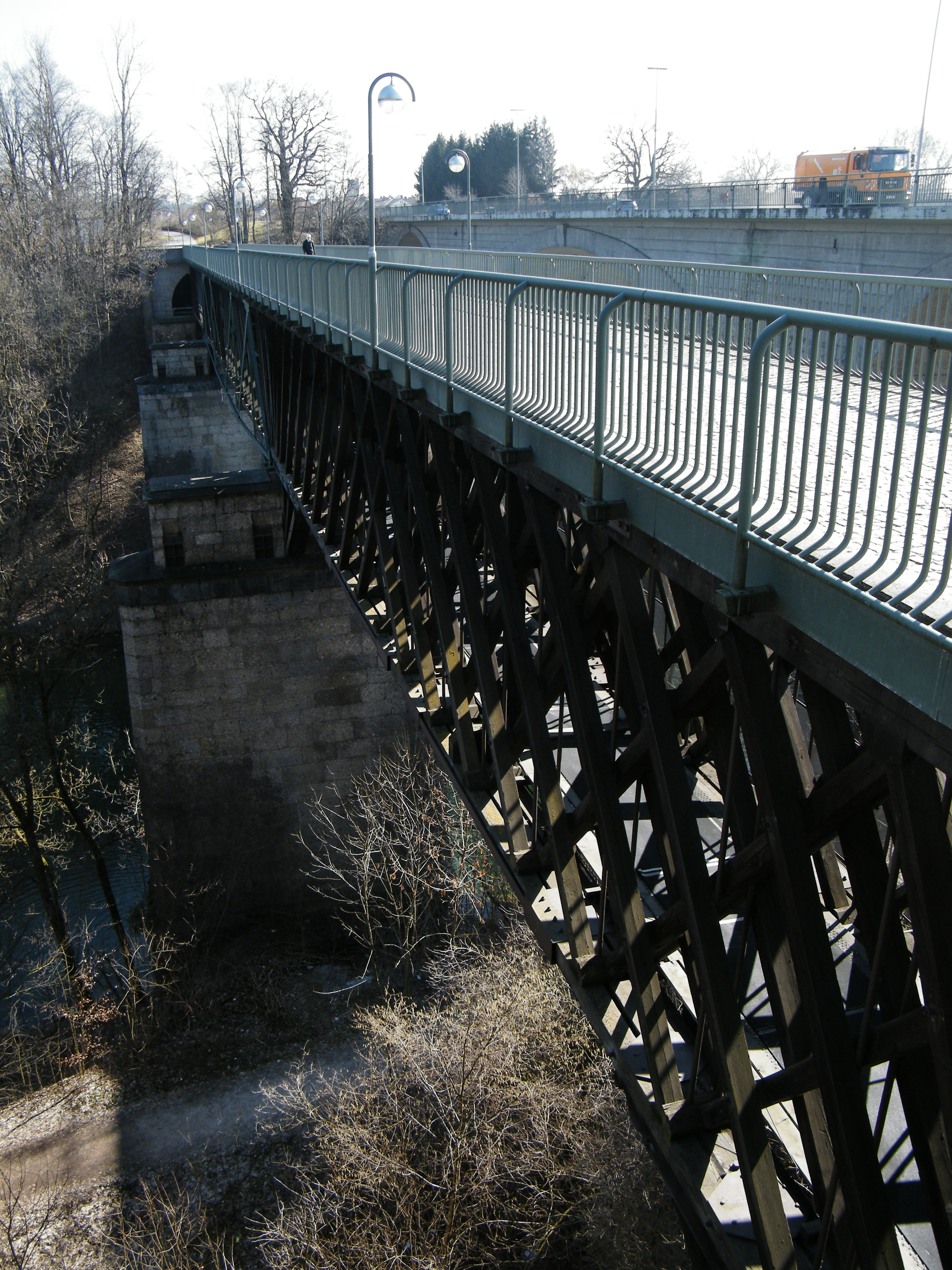
Lower Howe carriers

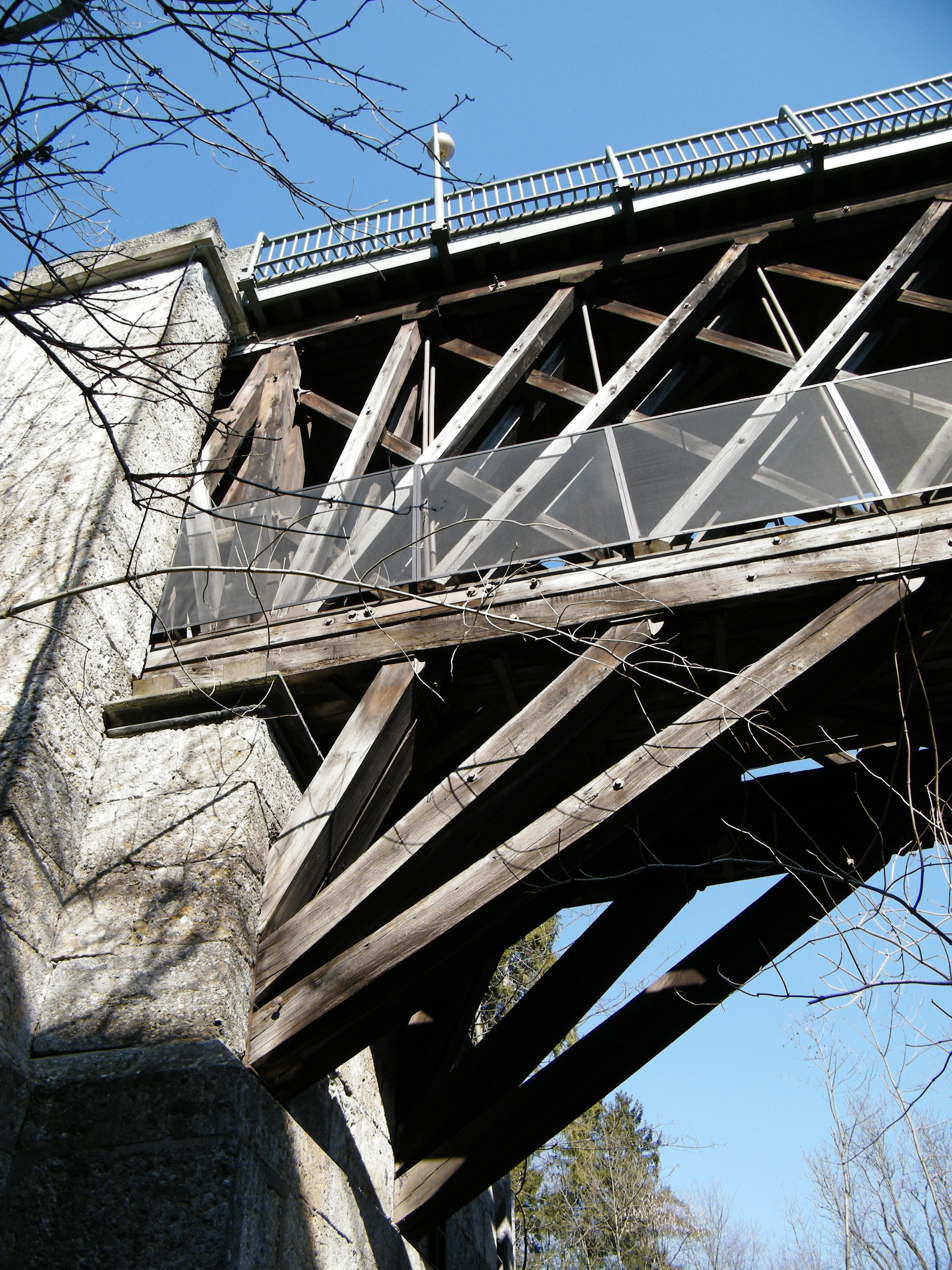
Bearing in detail

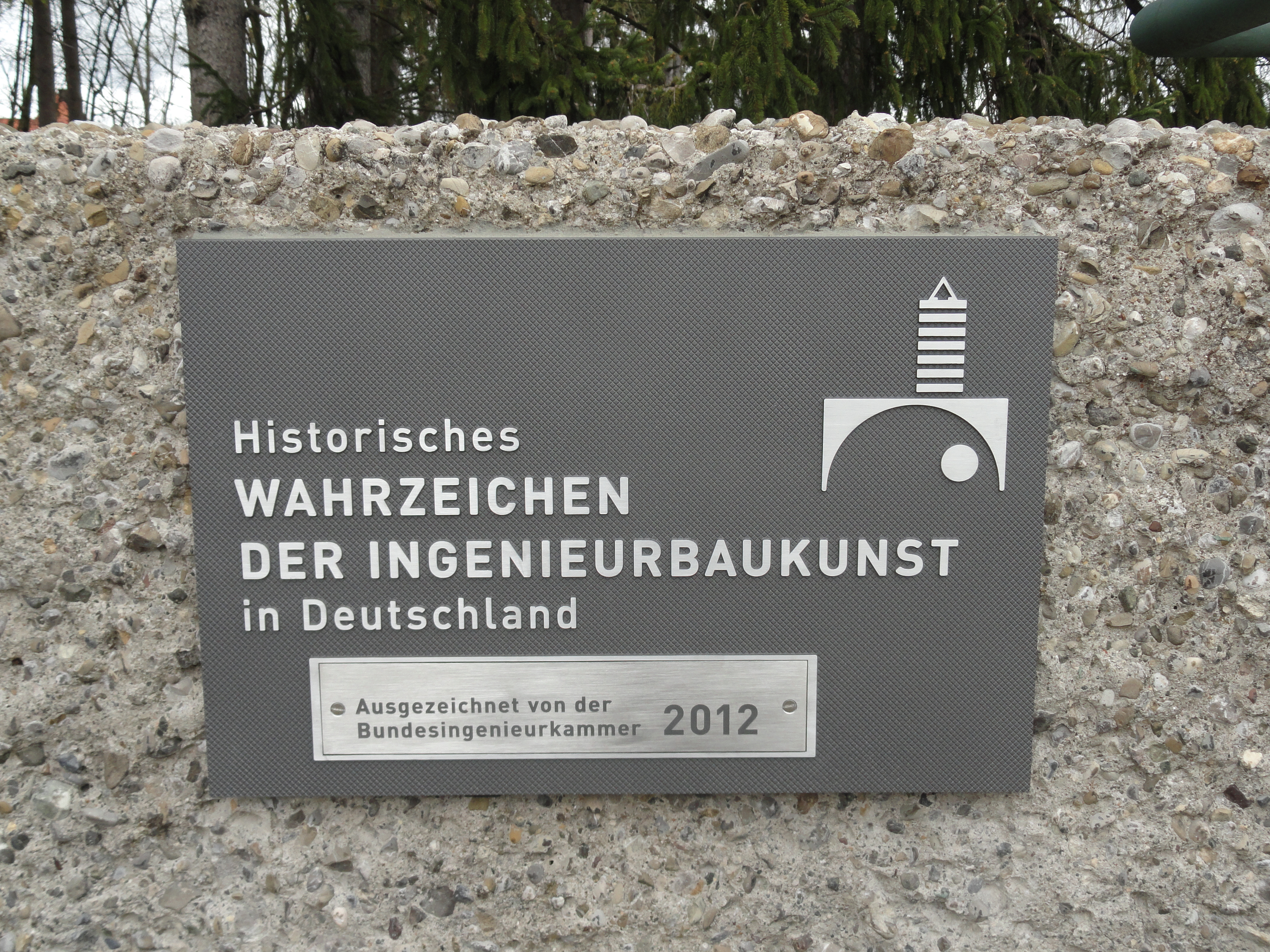
Badge of the award given by the National Chamber of Engineers

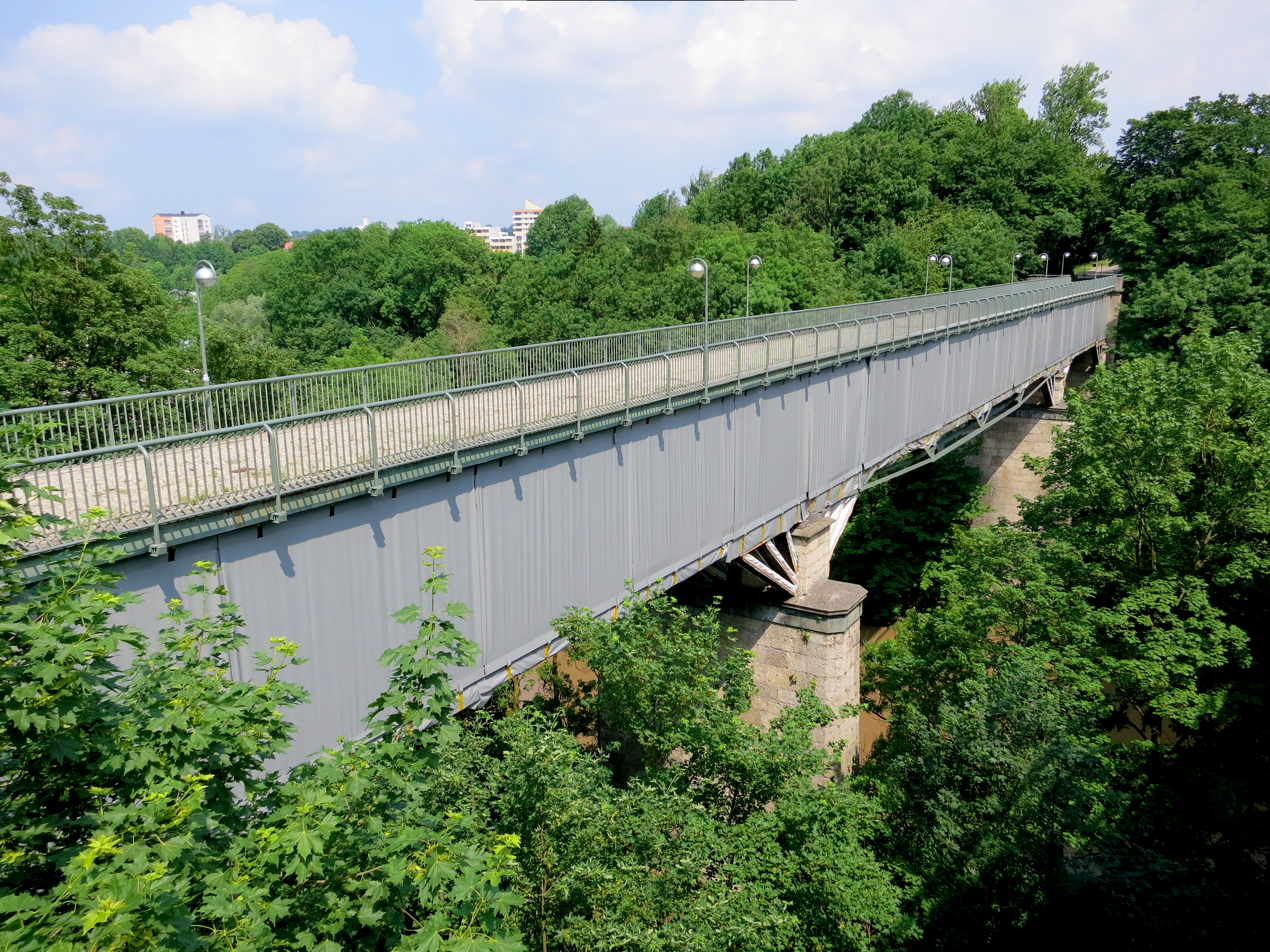
Panelling

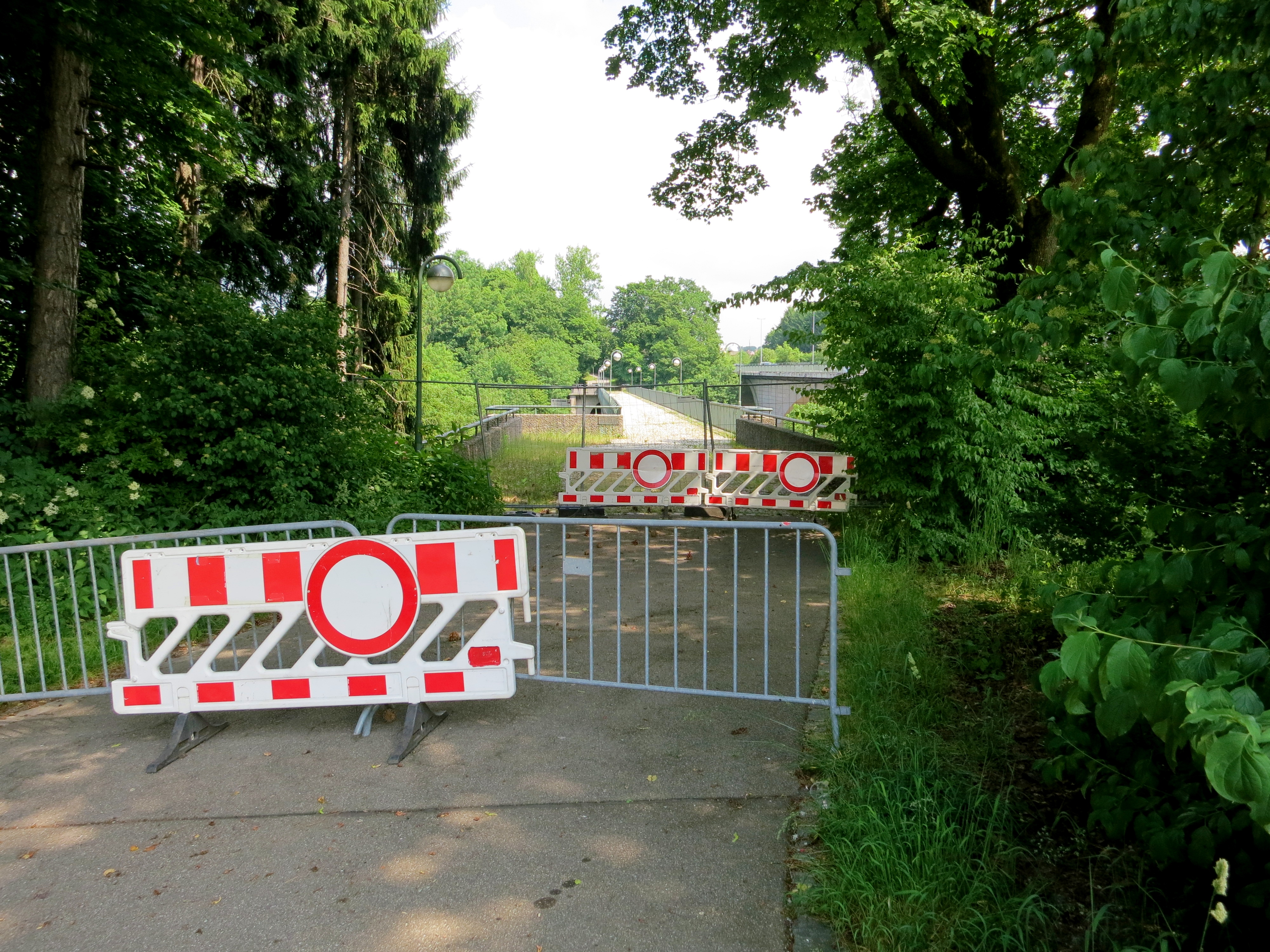
Barrier

== See also ==
- List of bridges in Germany
