= Lyendecker Lake =

Lake in the state of Minnesota, United States

- Location within Minnesota
- Location: Clearwater County, Minnesota
- Coordinates: 47°11′49″N 95°11′3″W
- Type: lake

Lyendecker Lake is a lake in Clearwater County, Minnesota, in the United States.

Lyendecker Lake was named for a travel companion of Jacob V. Brower.

== See also ==
- List of lakes in Minnesota
