= Mörsdorf =

- Municipality
- Coat of arms

- Location of Mörsdorf within Rhein-Hunsrück-Kreis district
- Interactive map of Mörsdorf
- Location within Germany Location within Rhineland-Palatinate
- Coordinates: 50°06′11″N 7°20′57″E
- Country: Germany
- State: Rhineland-Palatinate
- District: Rhein-Hunsrück-Kreis
- Municipal assoc.: Kastellaun

Government
  - Mayor (2019–24): Marcus Kirchhoff

Area
  - Total: 17.37 km^{2} (6.71 sq mi)
- Elevation: 340 m (1,120 ft)

Population (2025-12-31)
  - Total: 636
  - Density: 36.6/km^{2} (94.8/sq mi)
- Time zone: UTC+01:00 (CET)
  - Summer (DST): UTC+02:00 (CEST)
- Postal codes: 56290
- Dialling codes: 06762
- Vehicle registration: SIM
- Website: www.moersdorf-hunsrueck.de

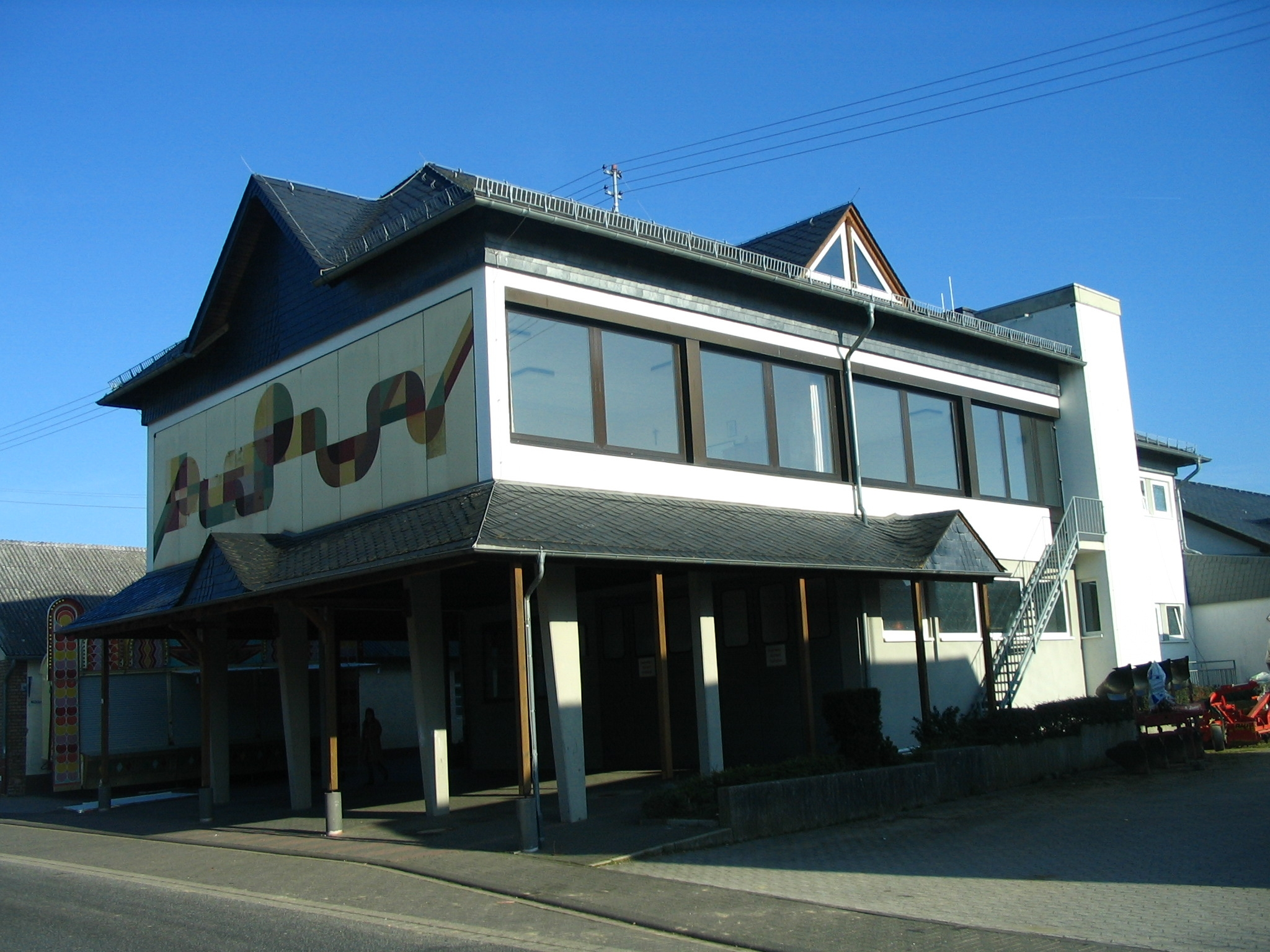
Modern community centre

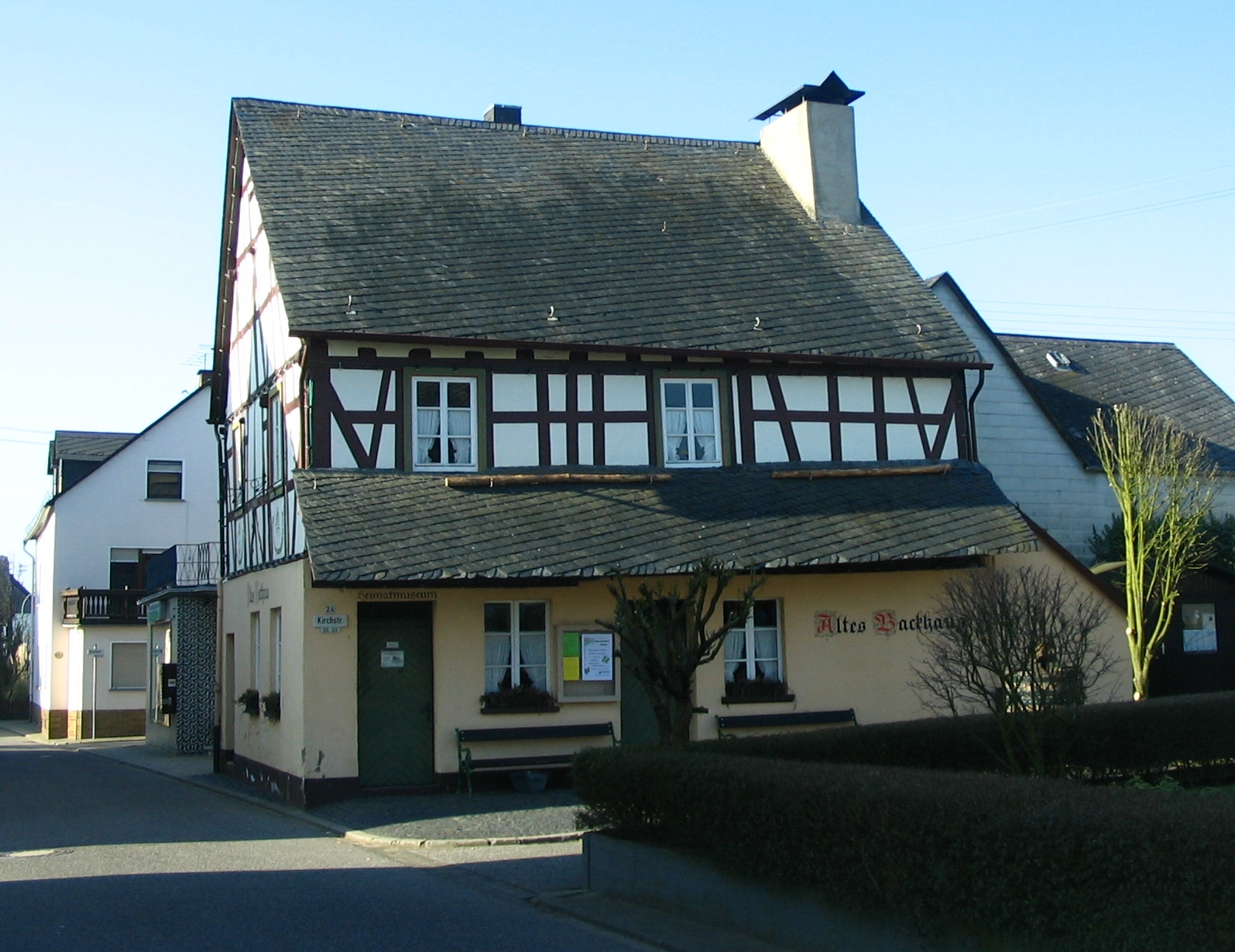
The old bakehouse serves today as a local history museum

Mörsdorf is an Ortsgemeinde – a municipality belonging to a Verbandsgemeinde, a kind of collective municipality – in the Rhein-Hunsrück-Kreis district in Rhineland-Palatinate, Germany. It belongs to the Verbandsgemeinde of Kastellaun.

== Geography ==
=== Location ===
The municipality lies on a high plateau in the northern Hunsrück between the Dünnbach valley in the east and the Flaumbach valley in the west.

=== Climate ===
Yearly precipitation in Mörsdorf amounts to 697 mm, which falls into the middle third of the precipitation chart for all Germany. At 39% of the German Weather Service's weather stations, lower figures are recorded. The driest month is February. The most rainfall comes in June. In that month, precipitation is 1.4 times what it is in February. Precipitation varies only slightly and is spread rather evenly throughout the year. At fewer than 1% of the weather stations are even lower seasonal swings recorded.

== History ==
In 1103, Moresdörf had its first documentary mention when the Ravengiersburg Monastery received one fourth of the village's tithes from St. Stephan in Mainz. In 1235 one fourth passed by donation to the St. Martinsberg Monastery near Trier. In 1359, the whole tithe belonged to the noble knight Colin von Senheim and his wife, who enfeoffed the Electorate of Trier with it. Mörsdorf belonged to the Beltheim High Court, and put up two of the 14 Schöffen (roughly "lay jurists") of the "three-lord" court that were named by the Electorate of Trier. The Electoral-Trier subjects were governed by the Amt of Baldeneck, while the Sponheim subjects were answerable to Bell in the Amt of Kastellaun. Metternich subjects were governed by the Lordship of Beilstein. The church in Mörsdorf is listed in the directory of archiepiscopal rights from about 1220, and appears once again in the Taxa generalia from about 1330 as a church in Morsdorff. The 1552 register and the 1569 Visitation protocol name the church as Saint Castor's. A grand new building was built in 1768 by Paul Stehling

Beginning in 1794, Mörsdorf lay under French rule. In 1814 it was assigned to the Kingdom of Prussia at the Congress of Vienna. Since 1946, it has been part of the then newly founded state of Rhineland-Palatinate. Before 1 July 2014, when it was assigned to the Rhein-Hunsrück-Kreis, it was part of the Cochem-Zell district.

== Politics ==
=== Municipal council ===
The council is made up of 12 council members, who were elected by majority vote at the municipal election held on 7 June 2009, and the non-paid mayor as chairman.

=== Mayor ===
Mörsdorf's mayor is Marcus Kirchhoff.

=== Coat of arms ===
The German blazon reads: Oben in Silber ein rotes, gekerbtes Balkenkreuz belegt mit einem schwarzen Turnierkragen, vorne in Schwarz ein silberner Maueranker, hinten in Schwarz eine goldene Palme, unten in silbernem Feld ein rotes Kleeblatt-Schaftkreuz.

The municipality's arms might in English heraldic language be described thus: Quarterly per saltire argent and sable, in chief a cross engrailed gules, surmounted in chief by a label of three points of the second, dexter a cramp bendwise of the first, sinister a palm leaf palewise Or, and in base issuant from base on a pedestal a cross bottony of the third.

The cross engrailed (that is, with wavy or sawtoothlike edges) refers to the noble family Beissel von Gymnich, who still had holdings in Mörsdorf as late as 1744. The palm leaf on the sinister (armsbearer's left, viewer's right) side is Saint Castor's attribute, thus representing the parish's and the church's patron saint. The charge on the dexter (armsbearer's right, viewer's left) side, known as a cramp, or crampoon, in English heraldry, and a Maueranker in the German blazon (a "wall anchor", which is likewise what a cramp is held to be in English heraldry, but not always in German), is drawn from the arms formerly borne by the Lords of Metzenhausen. They were enfeoffed with holdings in Mörsdorf by the Archbishop of Trier in 1493, and are known to have still held sway there in 1779. The charge in base, the red cross bottony (that is, with cloverleaf-shaped ends to the arms), is one of the many stone crosses of this shape that stand throughout the village; this one bears the year 1760.

The arms were designed by A. Friderichs of Zell and have been borne since 11 January 1982.

== Culture and sightseeing ==
=== Buildings ===
The following are listed buildings or sites in Rhineland-Palatinate’s Directory of Cultural Monuments:

- Saint Castor’s Catholic Parish Church (Pfarrkirche St. Kastor), Kirchstraße 15 – Baroque aisleless church, 1768, architect Paul Stähling (or Stehling), Strasbourg; three grave crosses, 1622, 1806, 19th century; further wayside and grave crosses, 1680, 17th and 18th centuries; ensemble with old graveyard and rectory
- Kastellauner Straße/corner of Kreisstraße (District Road) 38 – chapel standing as warriors’ memorial; whole complex with gate and hedges
- Kirchstraße 17 – former rectory; quarrystone building, 19th century; tithe barn; one-floor quarrystone building, mansard roof, 18th century
- Kirchstraße 24 – Old Town Hall, bakehouse and community centre; timber-frame building, partly solid or slated, marked 1645
- Kirchstraße 29a – Quereinhaus (a combination residential and commercial house divided for these two purposes down the middle, perpendicularly to the street); timber-frame building, partly solid, 19th century
- Pohlstraße/corner of Kastellauner Straße – basalt wayside cross, marked 1814
- St.-Castor-Straße (no number) – Quereinhaus; timber-frame building, partly solid or slated, 19th century
- Treiser Straße 5 – timber-frame house, partly solid, half-hipped roof, early 18th century
- Treiser Straße 7 – Quereinhaus; timber-frame building, partly solid, marked 1739
- Treiser Straße 9 – Quereinhaus; timber-frame building, plastered, mid 19th century
- Before Treiser Straße 19 – chapel, quarrystone building with brick framework, 19th century; basalt wayside cross, marked 1652
- On Landesstraße (State Road) 204, going towards Treis – milestone; basalt obelisk, latter half of the 19th century
- On Landesstraße 204, going towards Treis – Bildstock, 19th century
- On Landesstraße 204 – basalt wayside cross, marked 1709
- On Landesstraße 204 – basalt wayside cross, 18th century
