= List of medieval stone bridges in Germany =

This list of medieval stone bridges in Germany includes bridges that were built during the Middle Ages (between c. 500 and 1500 AD) on the territory of the present Federal Republic of Germany.

== Table of medieval stone bridges ==
Location	State	Name	River crossed	Built (or first mentioned)	Remarks	Photo
Bad Kreuznach	Rhineland-Palatinate	Old Nahe Bridge	Nahe river and Mühlenteich canal	Stone bridge c.1300, first mentioned in 1322. Houses first mentioned 1495, remaining houses built between 1582 and 1612.	The Alte Nahebrücke is one of the few remaining bridges in the world with buildings on it. It supports four buildings on its piers.	Alte Nahebrücke, Bad Kreuznach2
Bamberg	Bavaria	Upper Bridge	Regnitz	First mentioned 1387.	The bridge links the Old Town Hall (Bamberg), which is built on an artificial island in the river Regnitz, with both river banks.	
Bingen am Rhein	Rhineland-Palatinate	Drususbrücke	Nahe	11th century / 1772	Destroyed by French troops in 1689 and rebuilt in 1772 on the old foundations. Blown up by German troops in March 1945 and repaired in 1952.	
Creuzburg	Thuringia	Werrabrücke (Creuzburg)	Werra	1223		
Dresden	Saxony	on the site of the present-day Augustus Bridge	Elbe	1173–1222	Stone bridge destroyed in 1342 by St. Mary Magdalene's flood. New bridge built in 1344. Augustus Bridge built in 1727–1731 . New bridge built in 1907.	
Erfurt	Thuringia	Krämerbrücke (Merchants' Bridge)	Breitstrom, a side arm of the Gera	Original wooden bridge first mentioned 1117. Stone bridge built 1325. Houses completed 1486.	The bridge has been continuously inhabited for over 500 years, longer than any other bridge in Europe.	
Esslingen	Baden-Württemberg	Outer or Pliensau Bridge and Inner Bridge	Neckar	c. 1213 to 1259 built, first mentioned in 1286		
Frankfurt am Main	Hesse	Alte Brücke, Frankfurt	Main	Mentioned for the first time in 1276 as a stone bridge	Destroyed at least 18 times and replaced; demolished in 1914	
Hadamar	Hesse	Stone bridge (Hadamar)	Elbbach	1571 again built	Parts of the bridge date to the 12th century, after a flood in 1555 the bridge was rebuilt by 1571.	
Hadamar	Hesse	St. Wendelin's Bridge	Elbbach	12th century	The bridge was modified several times	
Hann. Münden	Lower Saxony	Old Werra Bridge	Werra	First mentioned in 1329		
Harburg	Bavaria	Old Bridge	Wörnitz			
Heidelberg	Baden-Württemberg	Old Bridge (Heidelberg)	Neckar	1284	Today: new bridge from 1788	
Hildesheim	Lower Saxony	Dammtor Bridge	Innerste	1159 or soon thereafter	Builder: Rainald von Dassel	
Jena	Thuringia	Camsdorf Bridge	Saale	15th century	Demolished in 1912, new bridge built 1913, blown up in 1945, rebuilt in 1946.	
Jena-Burgau	Thuringia	Old Saale Bridge	Saale	1491–1544	On the site of a wooden bridge first mentioned in 1484, rebuilt in 1706, several modifications up to 1744, blown up in 1945, rebuilt again from 2001-2004.	
Kitzingen	Bavaria	Alte Mainbrücke Kitzingen	Main	14th century		
Koblenz	Rhineland-Palatinate	Balduin Bridge (Koblenz)	Mosel	c. 1342/1343	On the site of a Roman Bridge (3rd to 5th centuries), several conversions to 1884, blown up in 1945, rebuilt in 1949, modified as part of the canalisation of the Moselle in 1964, restoration in 1975.	
Limburg an der Lahn	Hesse	Alte Lahnbrücke (Limburg)	Lahn	1315–1354	First mention of a wooden bridge in 1248	
Marburg	Hesse	Weidenhäuser Bridge	Lahn	c. 1250		
Ochsenfurt	Bavaria	Alte Mainbrücke Ochsenfurt	Main	1519	More recent historic research has revealed that it was on a par with the Old Main Bridge in Würzburg and the stone bridge in Regensburg.	
Plauen	Saxony	Alte Elsterbrücke	White Elster	First mentioned in 1244		
Quedlinburg	Saxony-Anhalt	Steinbrücke (Quedlinburg)	Mühlgraben, a branch of the Bode	1229 first recorded mention as the lapideus pons	Already built by 1310, 23 round arches over 103 metres	
Regensburg	Bavaria	Stone Bridge	Danube	Built 1135 to 1146 (probably), completed 1147 at the latest		
Rothenburg ob der Tauber	Bavaria	Tauber Bridge	Tauber	c. 1330		
Runkel	Hesse	Lahnbrücke (Runkel)	Lahn	1440–1448		
Schwäbisch Hall	Baden-Württemberg	Henkers Bridge, also Kocher Bridge	Kocher	1502	Built on the stone support of a wooden bridge of 1343	
Streithausen-Marienstatt Abbey	Rhineland-Palatinate	Stone bridge	Nister			
Vacha	Thuringia	Werra Bridge (Vacha), also Bridge of Unity (Brücke der Einheit)	Werra	1346		
Walting-Pfünz	Bavaria	Altmühlbrücke Pfünz	Altmühl	First mentioned in 1486	Blown up in 1800, rebuilt again in the 19th century	
Wetzlar	Hesse	Old Lahn Bridge, Wetzlar	Lahn	1250-1280 (suspected)		
Weilburg	Hesse	Stone Bridge, Weilburg	Lahn	1359	Present bridge dates to 1769, the fourth stone arch bridge on this spot	
Würzburg	Bavaria	Old Main Bridge, Würzburg	Main	c. 1120	Destroyed in 1342 by St. Mary Magdalene's flood. New bridge from 1476	

== See also ==
- List of bridges in Germany
- List of Roman bridges
- List of medieval bridges in France
