= Krämerbrücke =

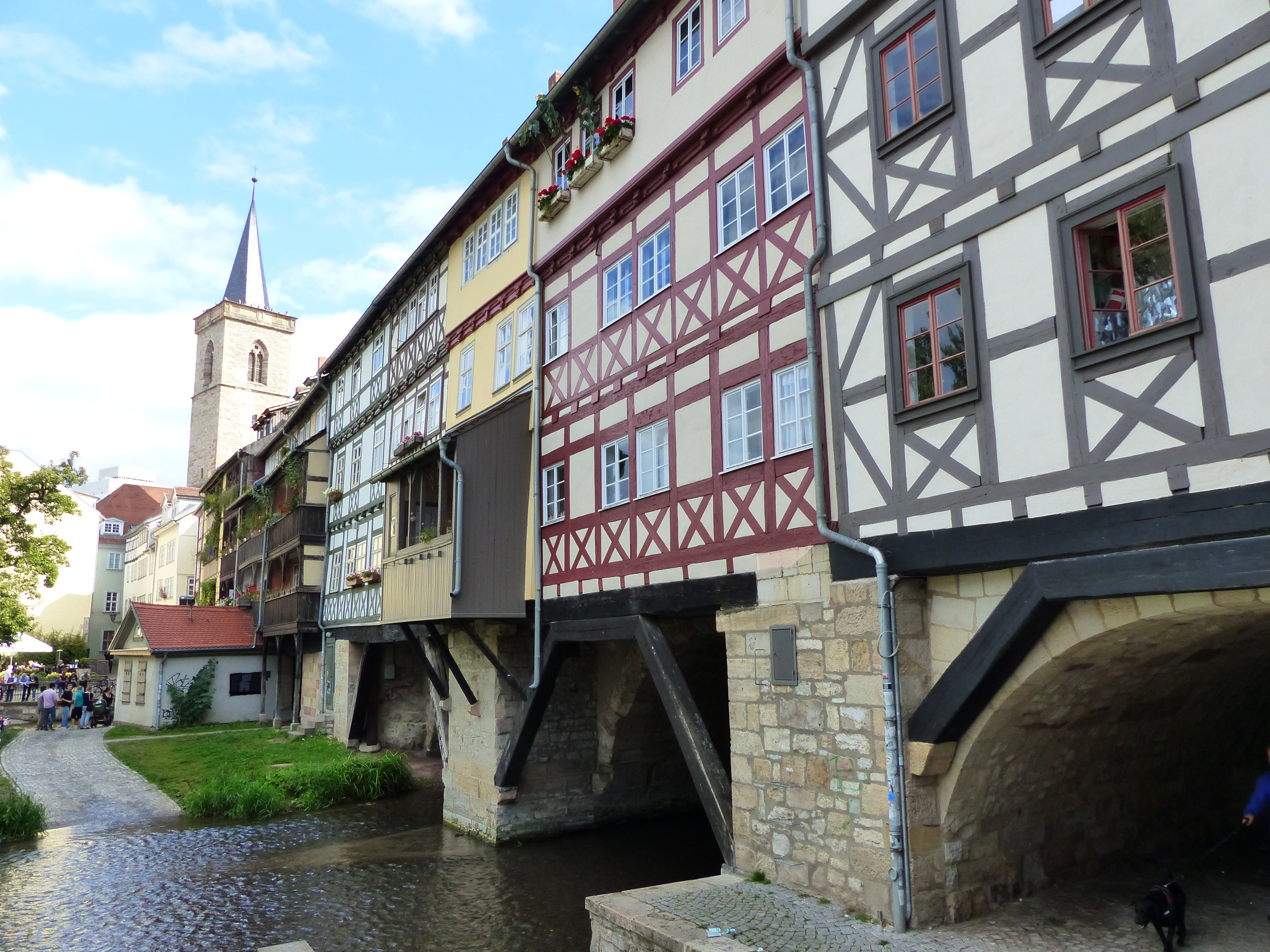
- North face of the Krämerbrücke
- Coordinates: 50°58′43″N 11°01′51″E
- Crosses: Gera, Breitstrom
- Locale: Erfurt, Thuringia, Germany
- Heritage status: Kulturdenkmal in Thuringia

Characteristics
- Design: segmental stone arch bridge
- Material: Limestone, sandstone
- Total length: 125 metres (410 ft 1 in; 136 yd 2 ft)
- Width: 26 metres (85 ft 4 in)

History
- Construction end: 1325 (stone bridge); 1486 (houses)

Location
- Interactive map of Krämerbrücke

The Krämerbrücke (pronounced [ˈkʁɛːmɐˌbʁʏkə]; Merchants' bridge) is a medieval arch bridge in the city of Erfurt, in Thuringia, central Germany, which is lined with half-timbered shops and houses on both sides of a cobblestone street. It is one of the few remaining bridges in the world that have inhabited buildings. It has been continuously inhabited for over 500 years, longer than any other bridge in Europe. The stone, pedestrian bridge, which dates from 1325, is one of the oldest secular structures in Erfurt. It spans the Breitstrom, a branch of Gera River, and connects two town squares – Benediktsplatz and Wenigemarkt.

== Structure ==
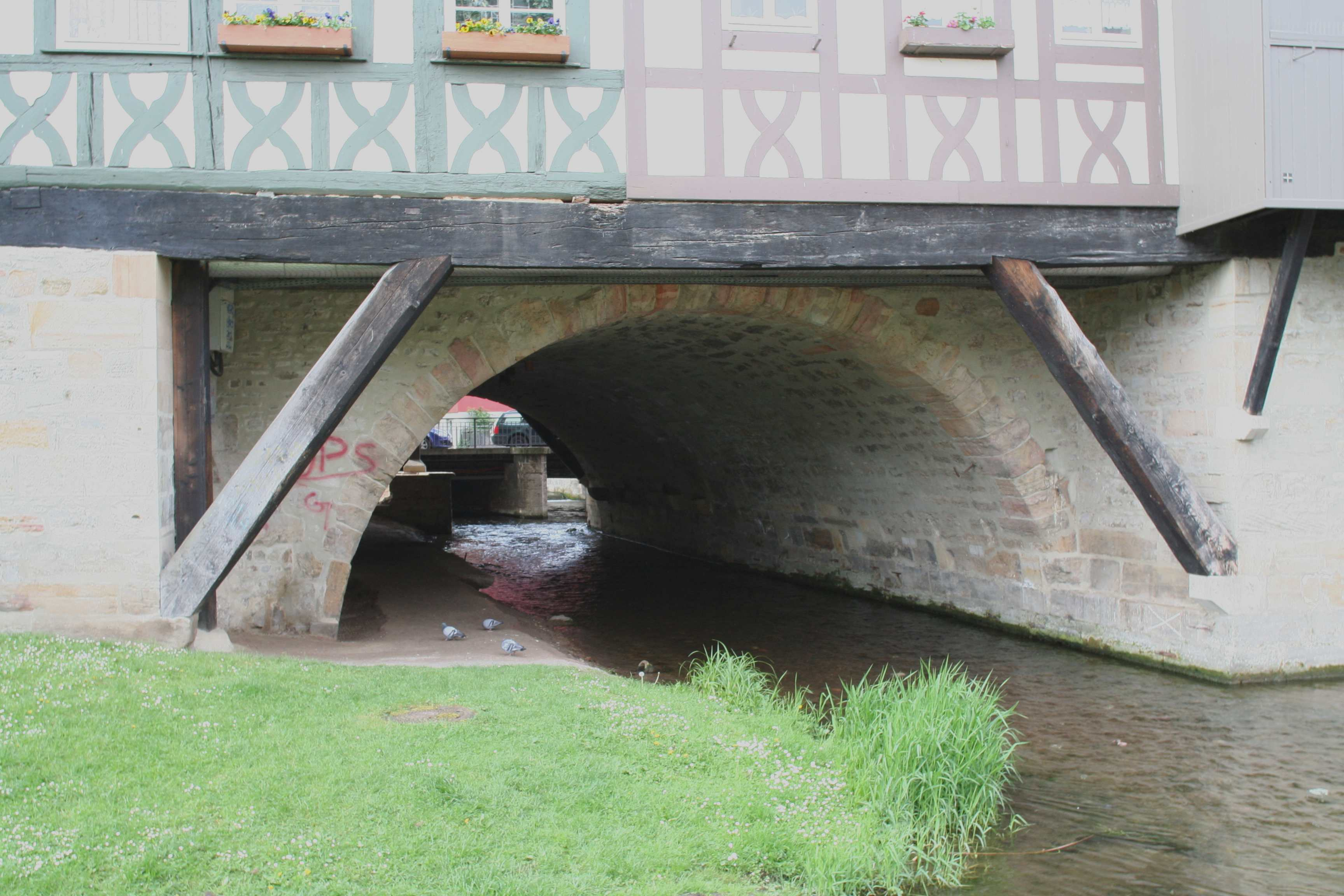
An arch of the Krämerbrücke, with wooden Sprengwerk in front of it

From end to end, the Krämerbrücke is 125 m (410 ft 1 in; 136 yd 2 ft) long in total. The stone bridge was constructed from limestone and sandstone in 1325, with six visible barrel arches ranging from 5.5 m (18 ft 1 in) to 8 m (26 ft 3 in) wide. The section of the bridge supported by the six arches is 79 m (259 ft 2 in; 86 yd 1 ft) long. Wooden stalls were built on top of the stone bridge for trading goods.

The bridge originally had stone churches at both ends, where gated entrances were erected – St. Benedict's Church at the western end and St Giles' Church (Ägidienkirche) at the eastern end. St Giles', the only one of the two that still exists, was previously a bridge chapel, first mentioned in 1110. The archway of the church, through which the Krämerbrücke can be entered, is 3.75 m (12 ft 4 in) wide and 3.25 m (10 ft 8 in) high.

The construction of the houses on the Krämerbrücke was completed in 1486, following a fire in 1472 which destroyed nearly half of the city and the market stalls on the stone bridge. Sixty-two timber-framed buildings were built on each side of the stone bridge, creating a street between the two rows. Later, the small houses were gradually merged, so that there are now 32 houses on the bridge. They have shops on the ground floor and living accommodation above. They are the longest rows of inhabited buildings on any bridge in Europe.

The three-storey houses are 13 m (42 ft 8 in) to 15 m (49 ft 3 in) in height. To make them habitable, the width of the bridge was extended by using wooden Sprengwerke (trusses or bracing) next to the arched vaults, so that the buildings partially overhang the stone bridge structure. The total width of the bridge, as completed in 1486, is 26 m (85 ft 4 in). The road between the two rows of buildings is 5.5 m (18 ft 1 in) wide.

== History ==
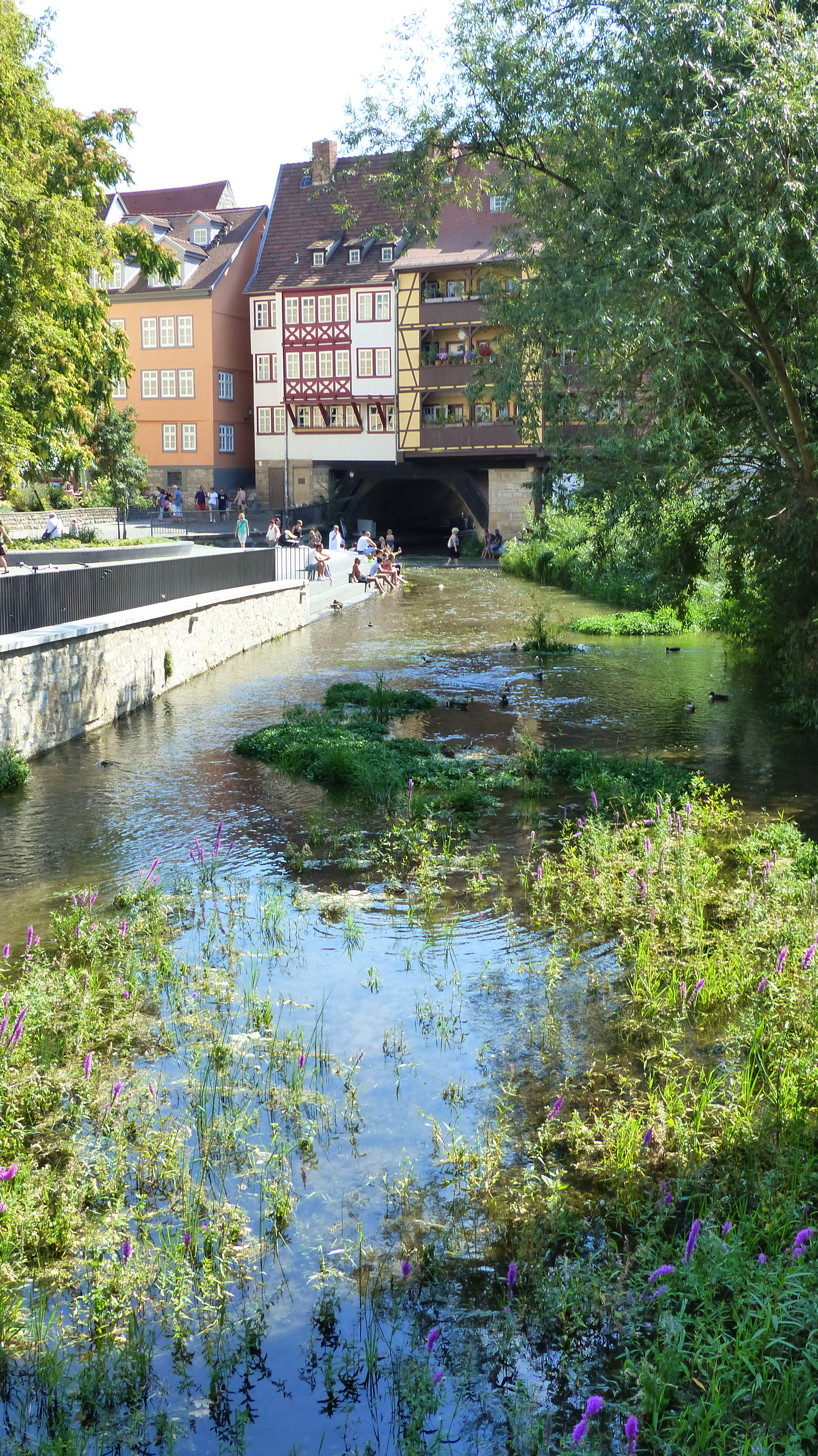
North side, Krämerbrücke from the river, 2016

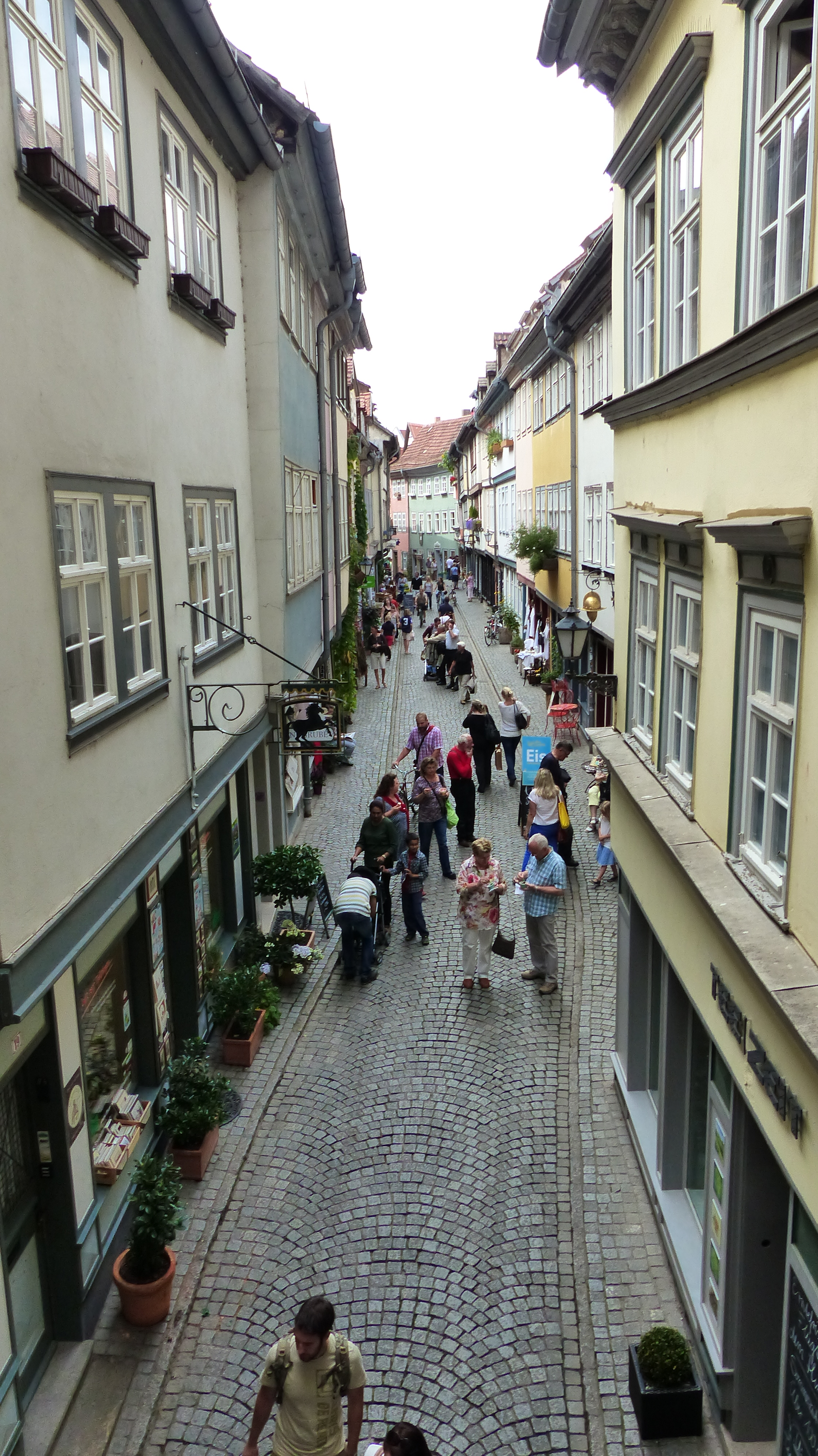
Krämerbrücke, street view looking west

The bridge was part of the Via Regia, a medieval trade and pilgrims' road network, which linked Rome with the Baltic Sea, and Moscow with Santiago de Compostela in northern Spain. The Krämerbrücke is on the route from the river Rhine to Silesia. It is also on one of the main routes of the Camino de Santiago, the Way of St. James pilgrimage. Erfurt was at a major crossroads of the Via Regia and it became an important trading centre in the Middle Ages. It was a member of the Hanseatic League.

A wooden bridge was built sometime between the 8th and 11th centuries at the same river ford as the present-day Krämerbrücke. The bridge was first mentioned in 1117 after its destruction by one of many fires.

The first written evidence of a "pons rerum venalium", i.e. "a market bridge", on the site dates back to 1156. Merchants and tradespeople had already set up market stalls on both sides of the bridge by this date. The name Krämerbrücke, which means "merchants' bridge", has been in common usage since 1510.

There were repeated fires on the wooden bridge in 1175, 1178, 1213, 1222, 1245, 1265, and 1293. The idea of building a stone bridge was discussed after the 1265 fire and in 1293 the municipal administration acquired all bridge rights from the monasteries, who traded goods on the bridge. However, the stone bridge wasn't completed until 1325.

For about the first hundred years following the stone bridge's construction, mainly local produce was sold in its stalls. There were a number of important monasteries in Erfurt, including St Augustine's, where Martin Luther was later a monk; the Dominican Prediger Monastery where the mystic Meister Eckhart (c. 1260–1328) was the prior; and the Benedictine monastery of St Peter and Paul, which was on the hill where Petersberg Citadel now stands. These continued to have stalls on the bridge, selling "Apoteki", such as herbs for healing and culinary use, wine and vegetables.

Later, goods such as paper, goldsmiths' work, silk, spices and oriental perfumes such as frankincense from places up to 7000 km away were sold on the bridge, and the locally produced woad, a valuable and important dye for which Erfurt was renowned, was sold to traders who took it across Europe.

During the 16th and 17th centuries, after the current half-timbered houses had been built, trades people such as toymakers, furriers, passementerie makers and leather tanners began to operate from the workshops on the bridge.

In 1624 the city council gave permission for street musicians to play on and around the bridge, with flutes, fiddles, trumpets, crumhorns and pommers. Street musicians still play on the bridge today; both traditional music and contemporary bands are an important part of the annual Krämerbrückenfest.

=== 19th and 20th centuries ===
St. Benedict's Church at the west end of the bridge was sold in 1807 and later demolished, apart from its tower, in 1810, in order to build a new house. In 1895 the tower was also demolished to enable the construction of the Rathausbrücke (town hall bridge), which crosses the river parallel to the Krämerbrücke on its south side. When the Rathausbrücke was being planned, the idea of completely demolishing the Krämerbrücke was discussed.

In 1945, house numbers 11 to 14 were damaged in an allied air raid, with number 12 being completely destroyed. The buildings were reconstructed in 1954.

An extensive restoration of the whole bridge structure, including the arched vaults, was carried out by the East German government in 1985 and 1986. Since then, vehicles up to a weight of 11 tons have been allowed to use the bridge, although it remains essentially a pedestrian bridge, with only small delivery and maintenance vehicles accessing it at restricted times.

Since 1990 the bridge has been under continual maintenance. Over 1 million Euro has been spent on it.

== The Krämerbrücke today ==
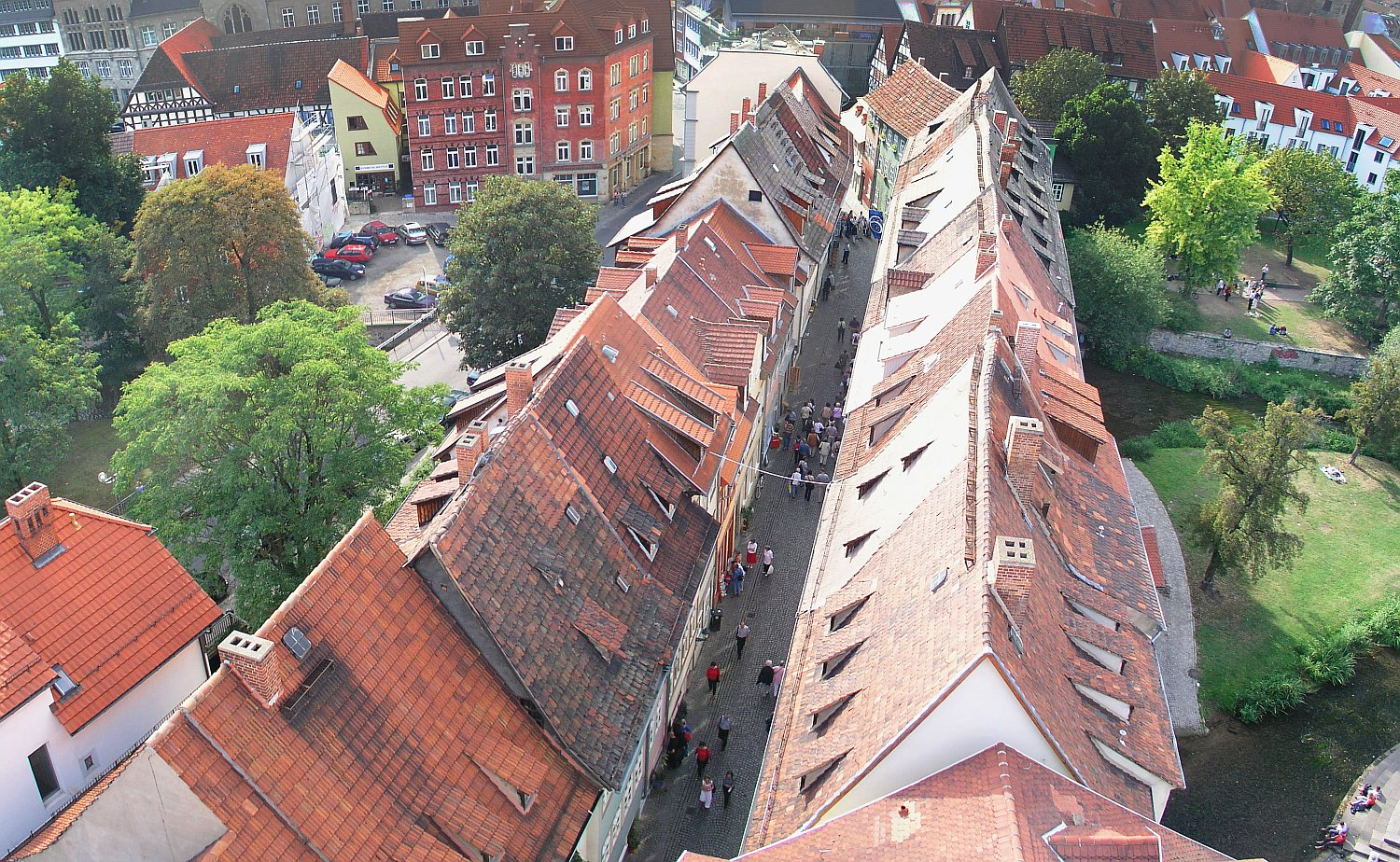
Krämerbrücke viewed from St. Ägidien's tower

The bridge is still an important thoroughfare for local residents, as well as being one of Erfurt's main tourist sites. It is still in much the same use as it has been for over 500 years.

About 80 people live on the Krämerbrücke. The shops at street level house businesses such as artisans' workshops, specialist food outlets, antique shops, wine merchants, art galleries, cafes, etc. A bakery operates at the western end of the bridge. The upper levels of the buildings are mainly inhabited homes. Except for the buildings numbered 15, 20, 24, and 33, all the other buildings on the bridge are municipal property.

In medieval times buildings were not numbered and many people were illiterate, so house signs were sometimes hung on buildings or placed over doorways, so that the house and its occupants could be easily located. Examples of these can still be seen on the bridge, as well as original doors which may be hundreds of years old.

The Stiftung Krämerbrücke (Krämerbrücke Foundation) was founded in 1996 by the city council. It is responsible for maintaining the bridge and promoting its history. The foundation strictly controls what type of businesses can operate from the bridge to ensure that it remains in keeping with its historical roots. In the "Haus der Stiftung" (Krämerbrücke 31), there is a permanent exhibition about the history of the bridge. The information centre also provides information on the organisations that ensure that the bridge is properly looked after; these are:

- Stiftung Krämerbrücke (Krämerbrücke Foundation)
- Deutsche Stiftung Denkmalschutz (German Foundation for Monument Protection)
- Elisabeth and Fritz Thayssen Stiftung Hamburg

== Krämerbrückenfest ==
The Krämerbrückenfest is an important festival in Erfurt, attracting about 130,000 visitors. The three-day festival has been held in the third week of June annually since 1975. It is a celebration of the bridge and the culture of the Middle Ages. The festival is officially opened by an actor playing the folkloric character Till Eulenspiegel, who according to legend visited Erfurt and fooled the professors at the university that he had taught a donkey to read.

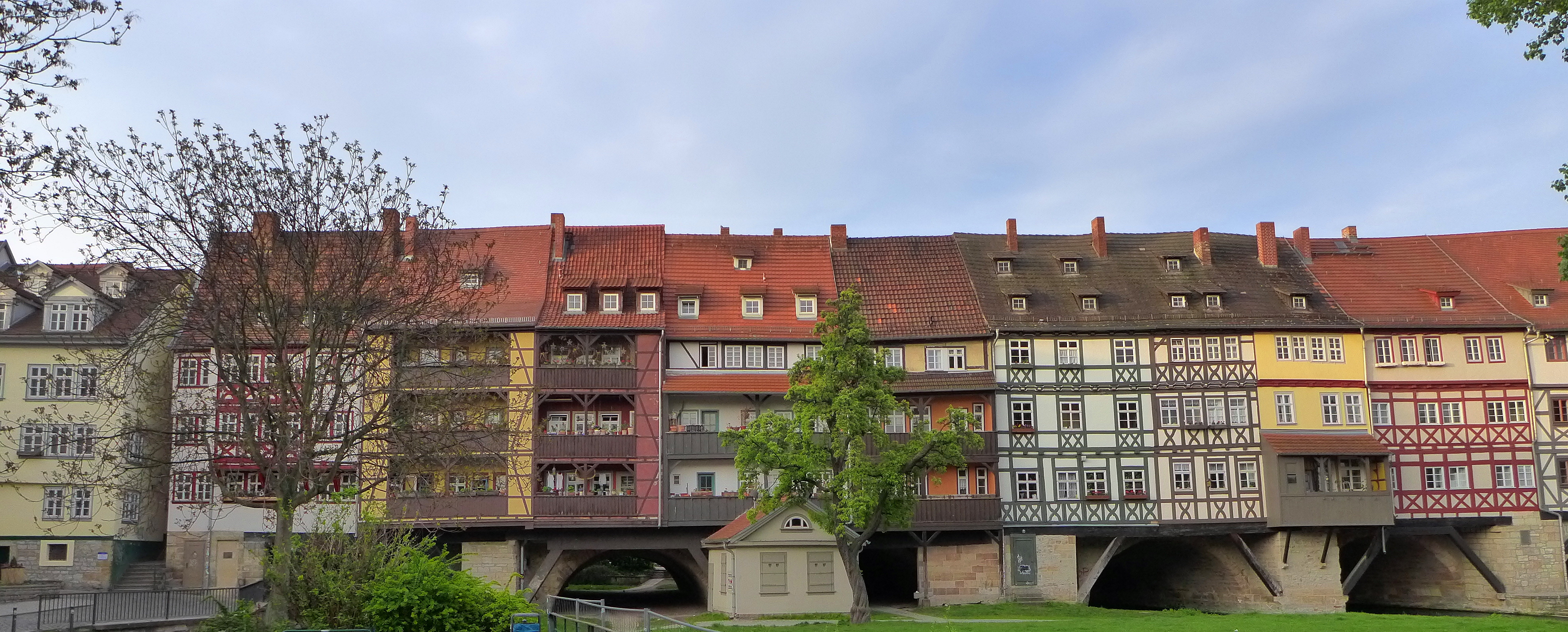
Panoramic view of the Krämerbrücke, North face.

== Gallery ==
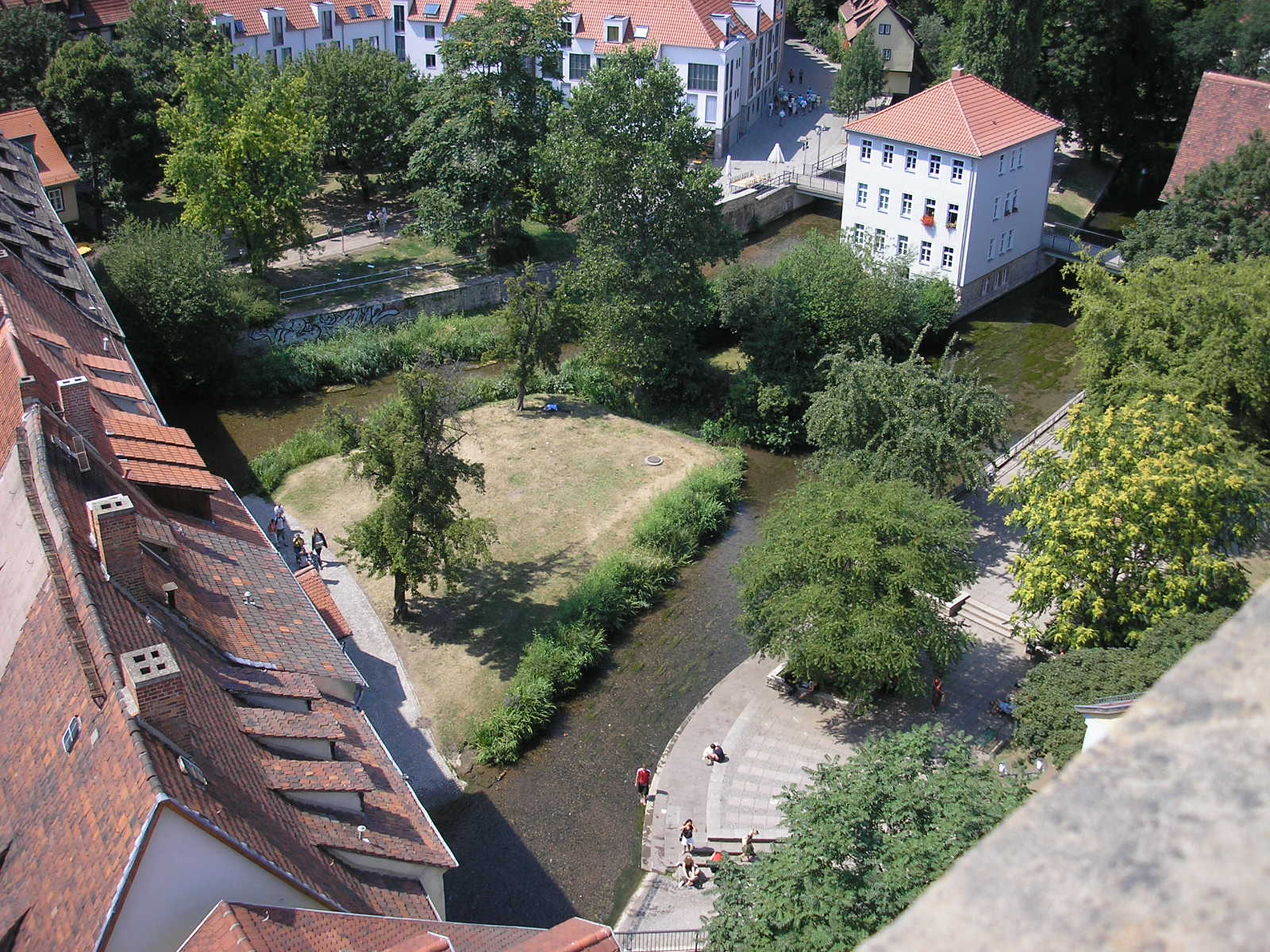
Aerial view, North side, Krämerbrücke, 2006

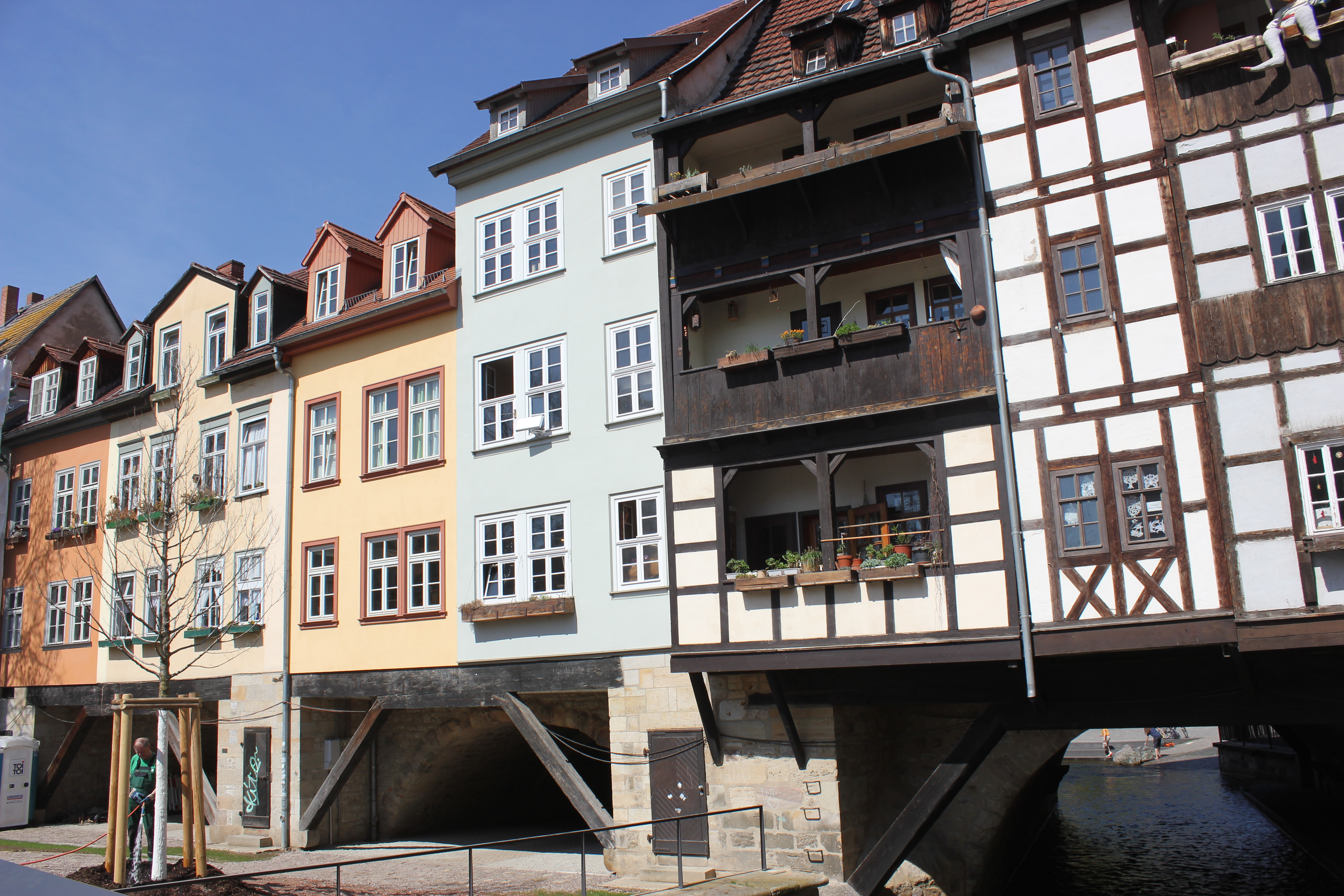
South side, Krämerbrücke, 2018

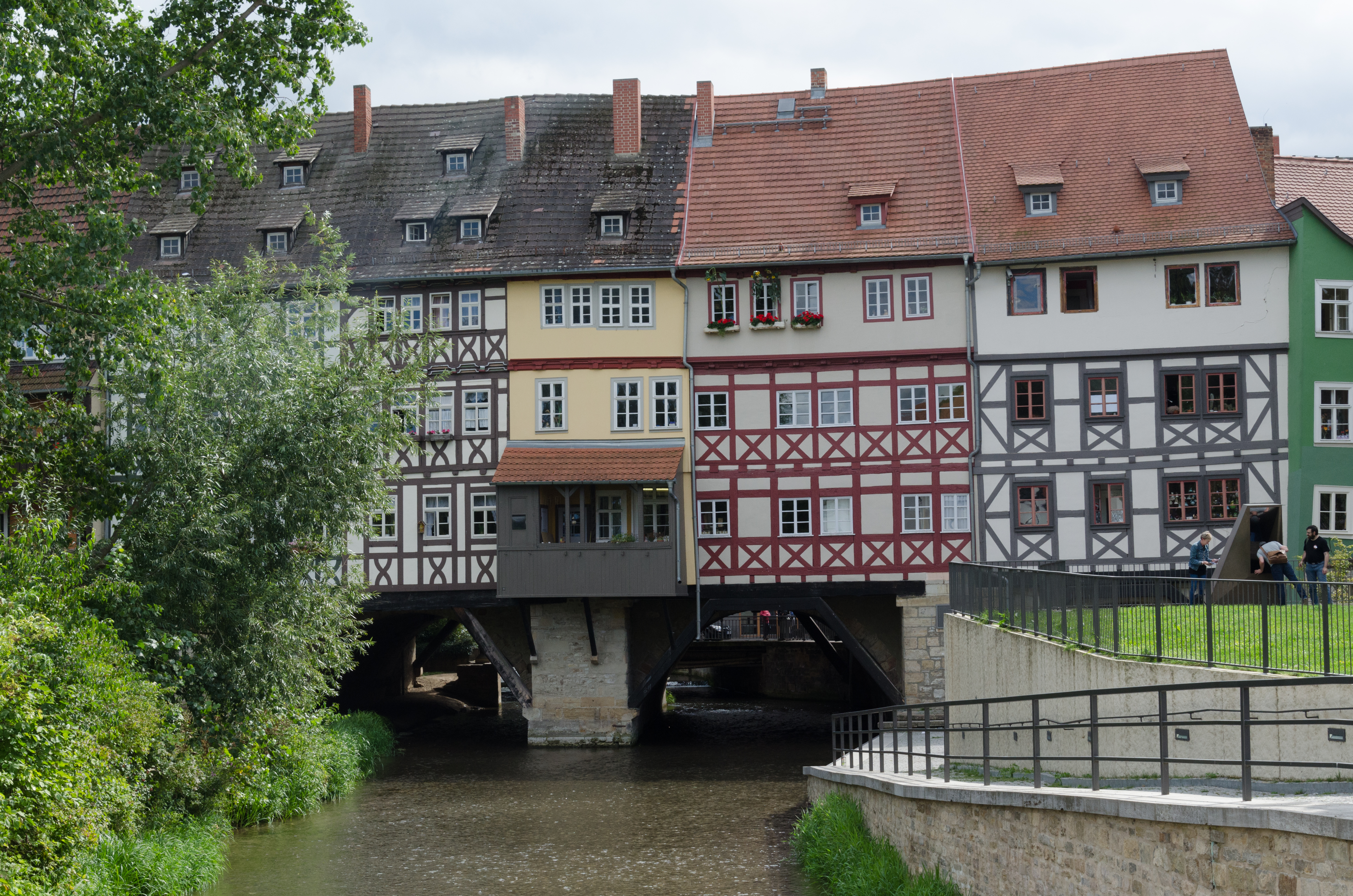
North side, Krämerbrücke from the River Gera, 2014

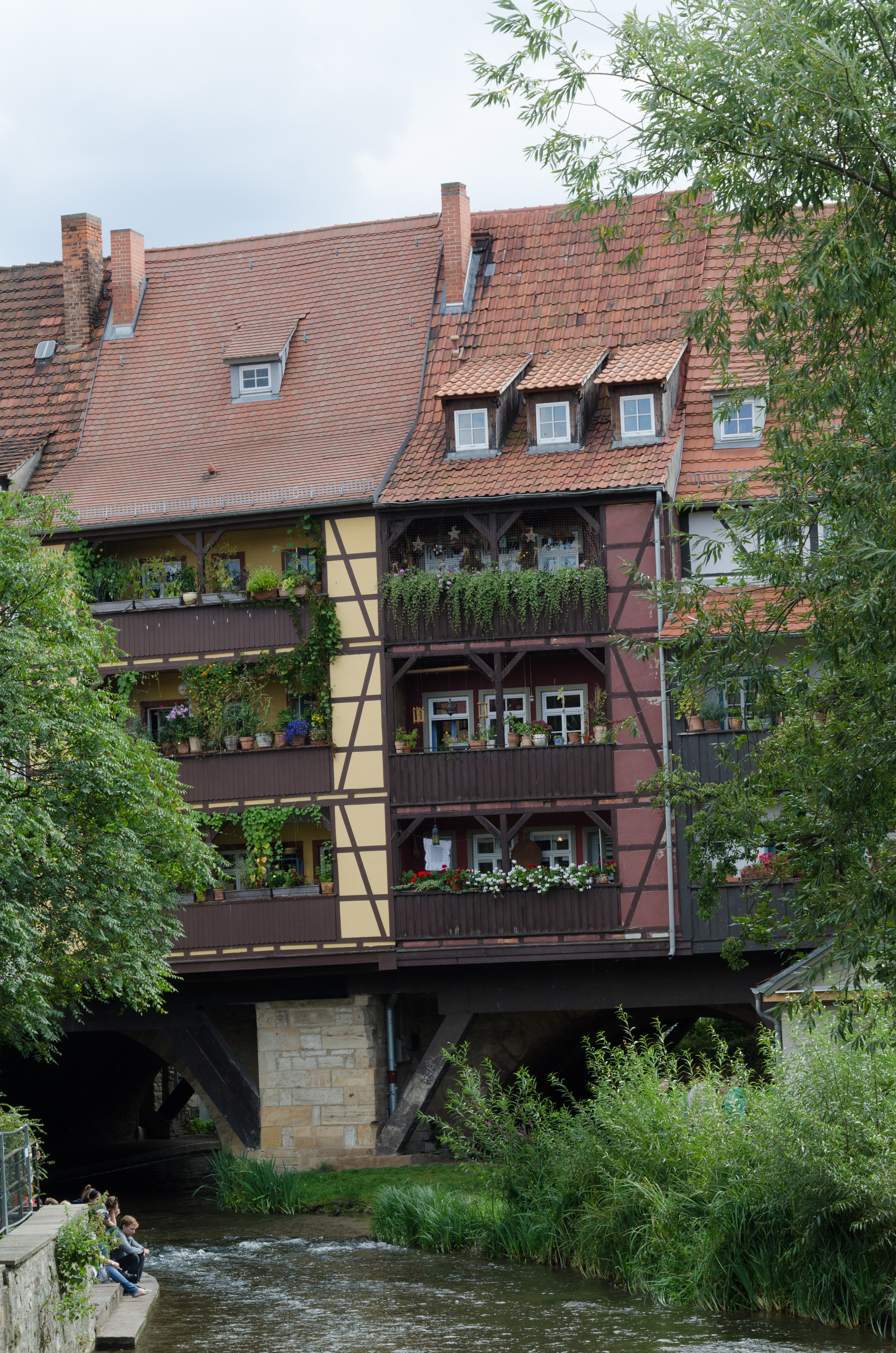
Balconies, Krämerbrücke

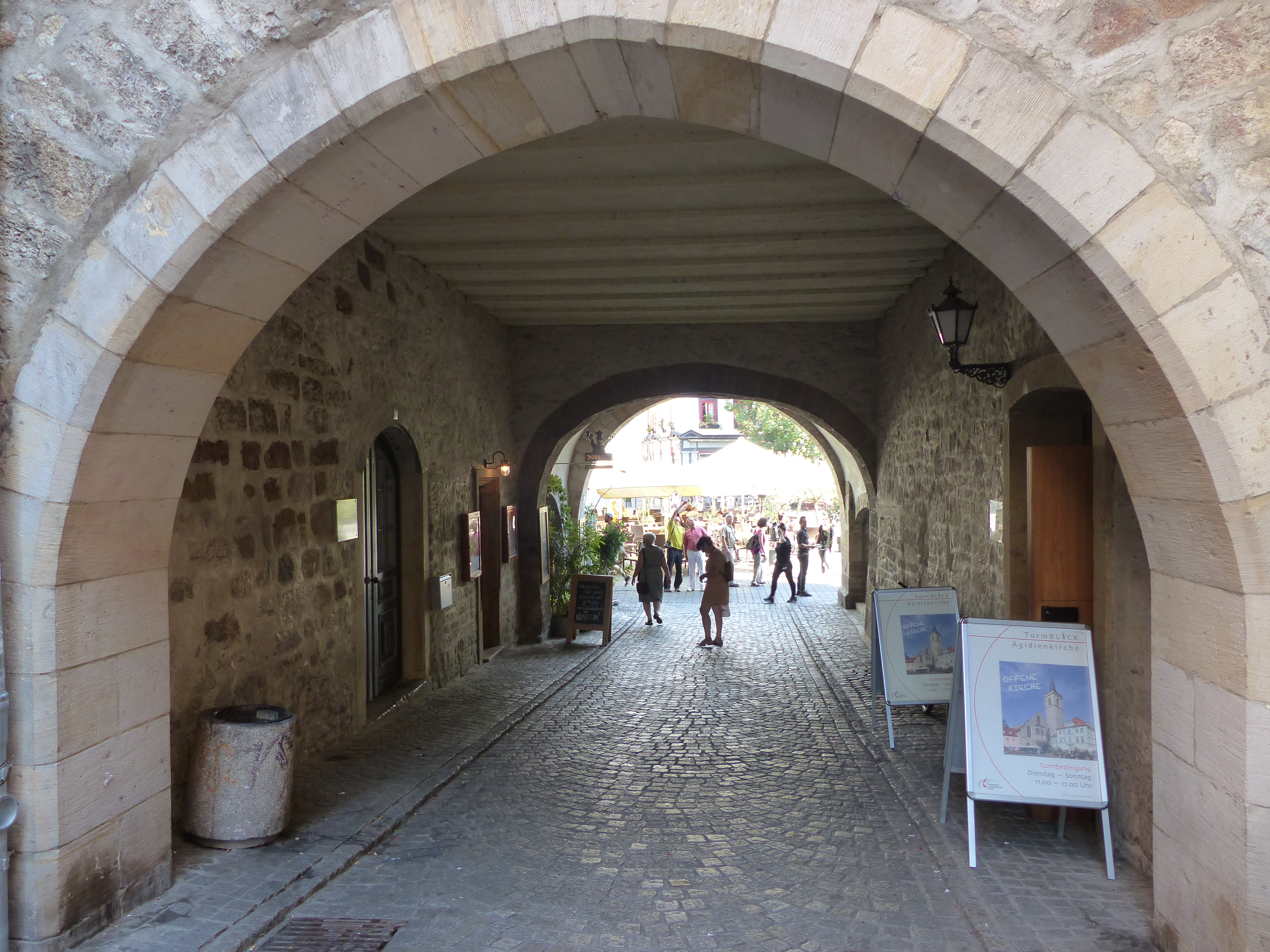
From Krämerbrücke into Wenigemarkt via arch of St Ägidien's Church

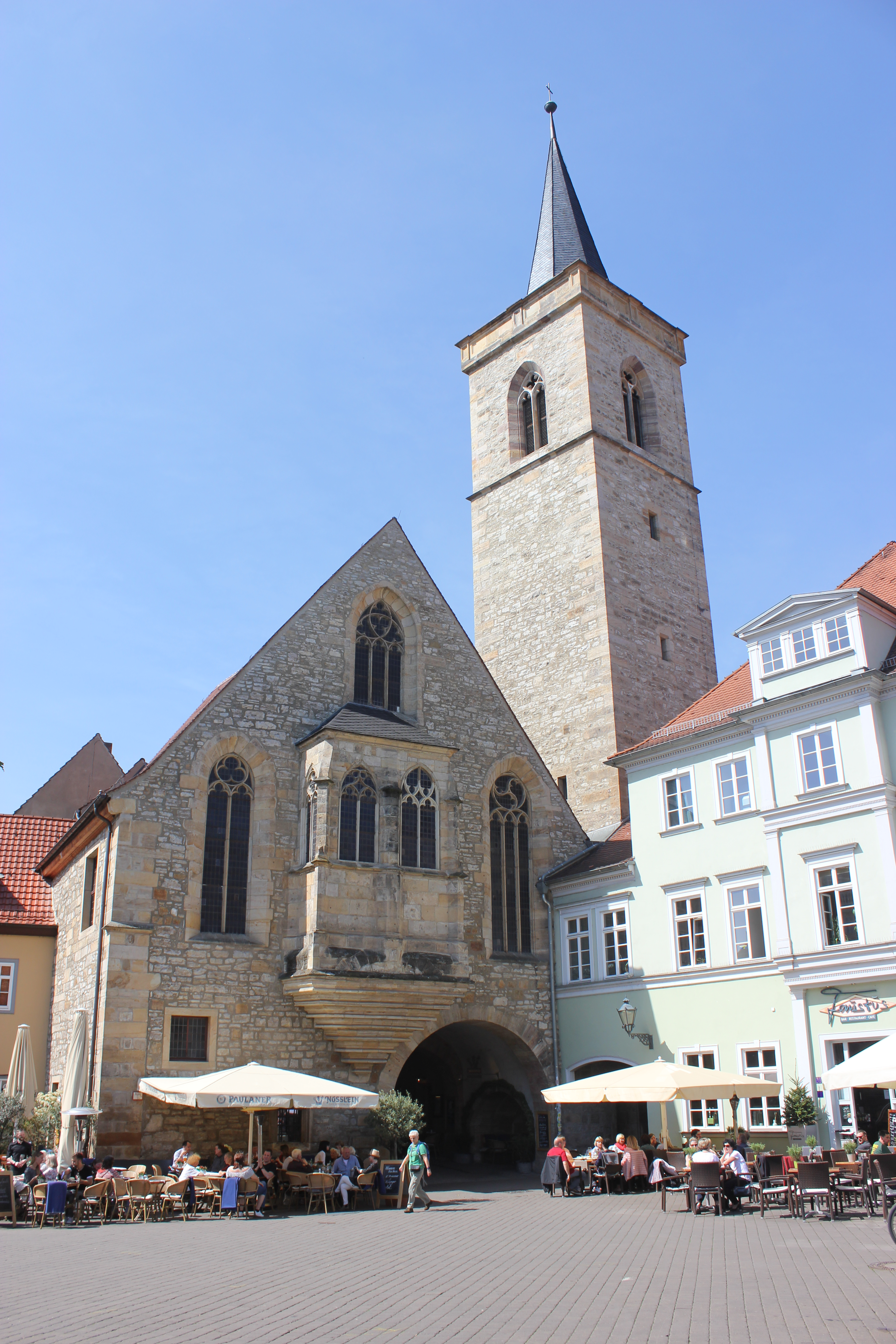
St Ägidien's Church from Wenigemarkt, 2018

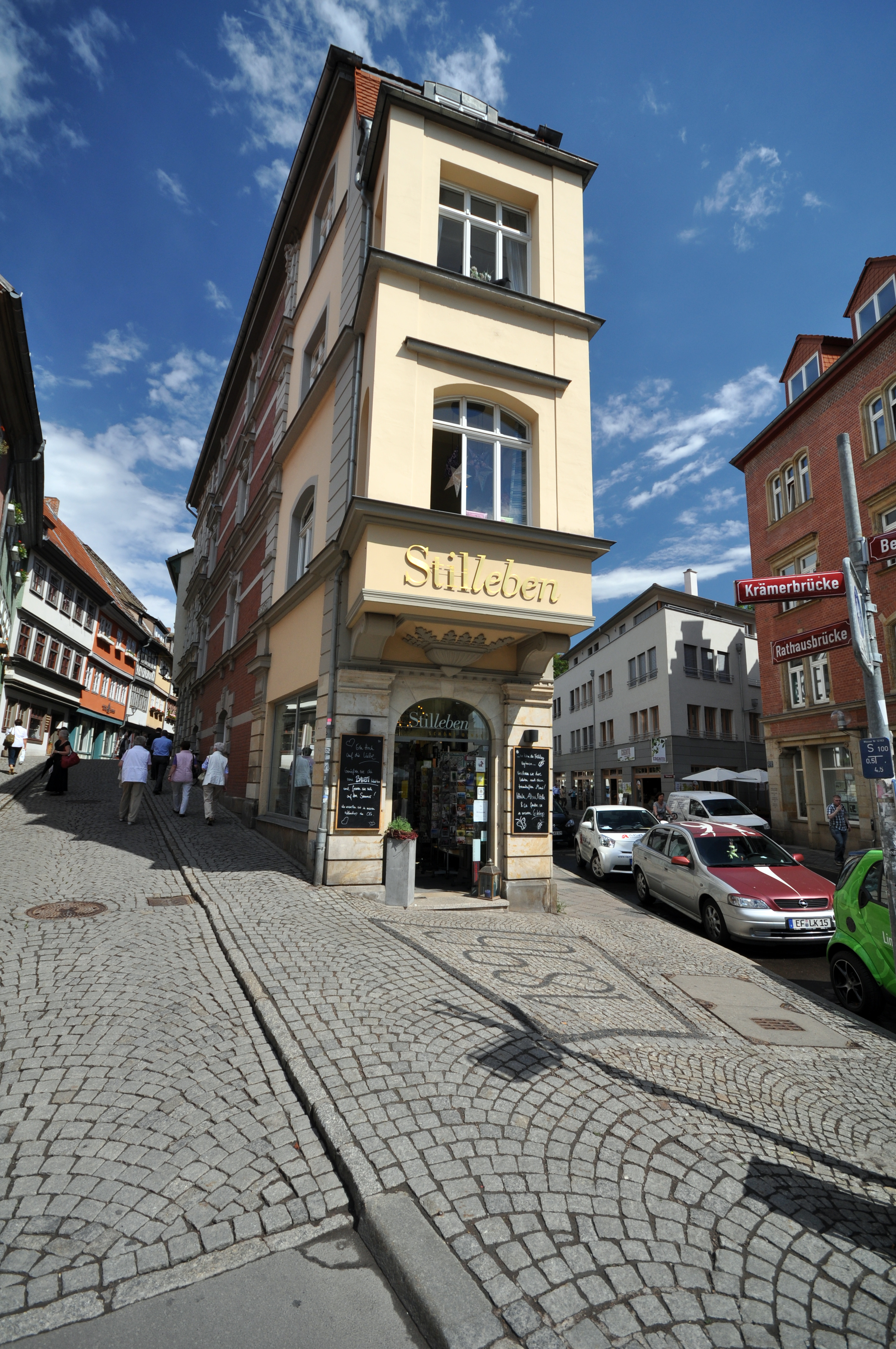
Western entrance to Krämerbrücke from Benediktsplatz, 2011

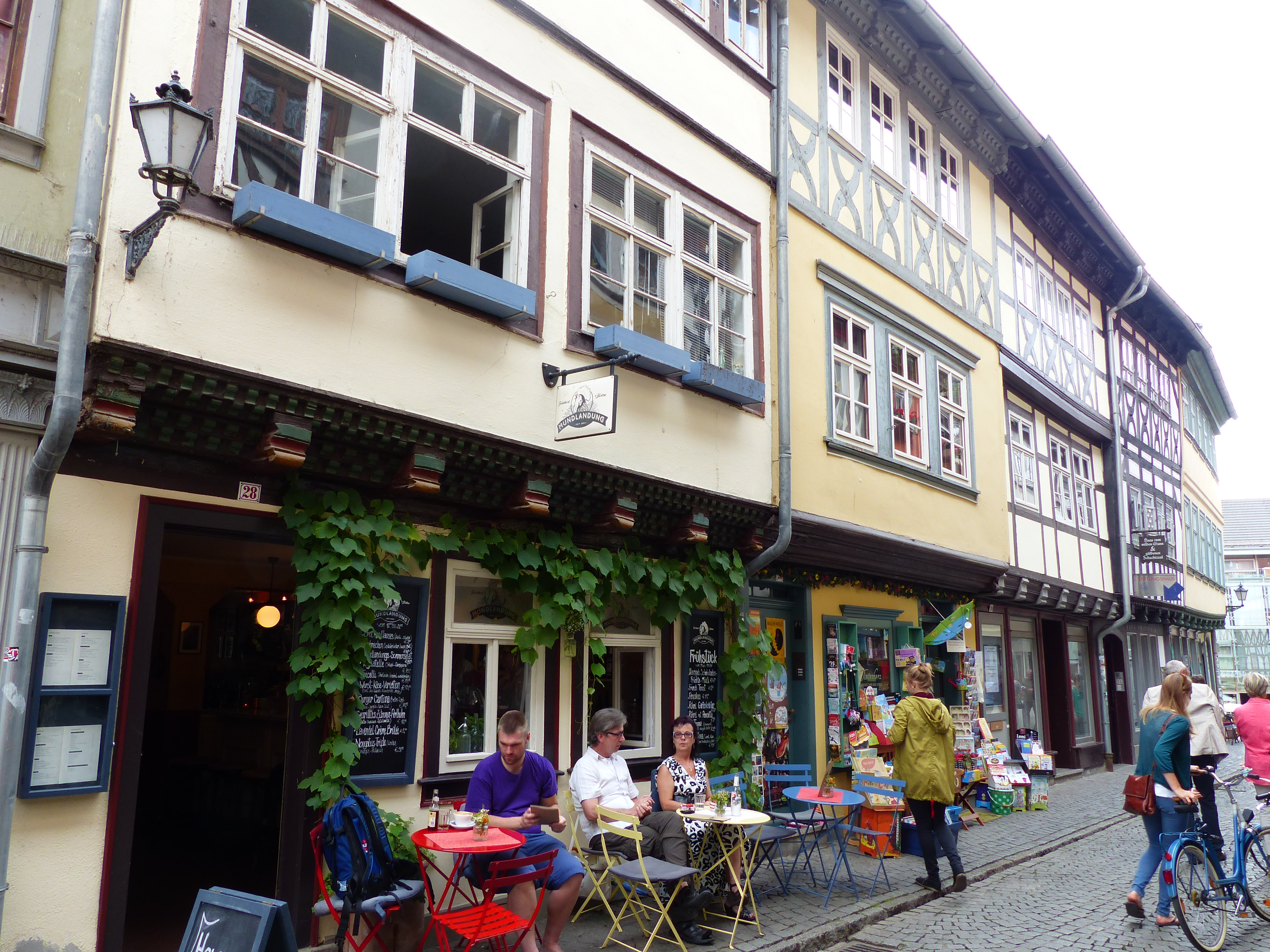
Krämerbrücke street view looking west, 2014

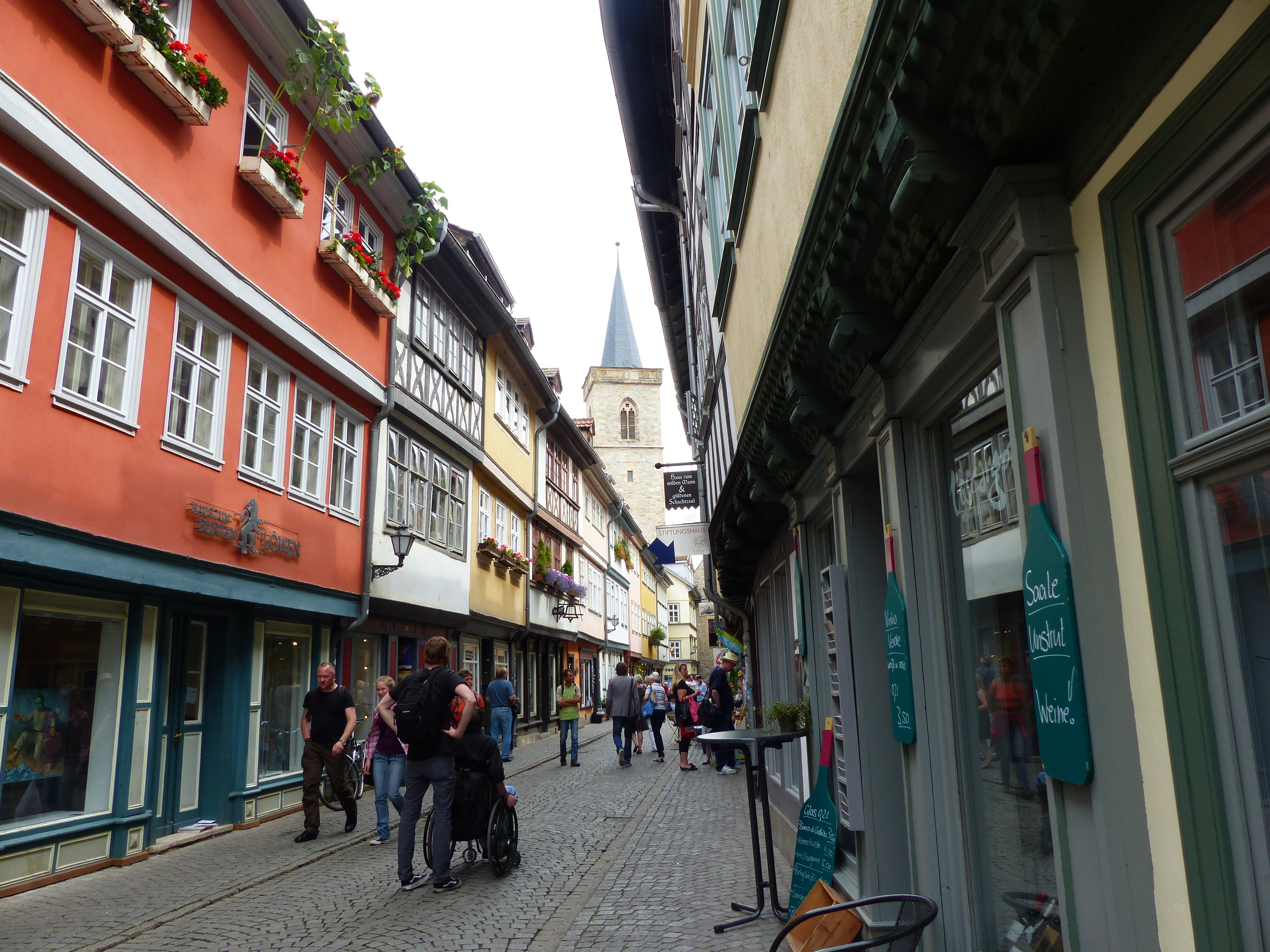
Krämerbrücke street view looking east, 2014

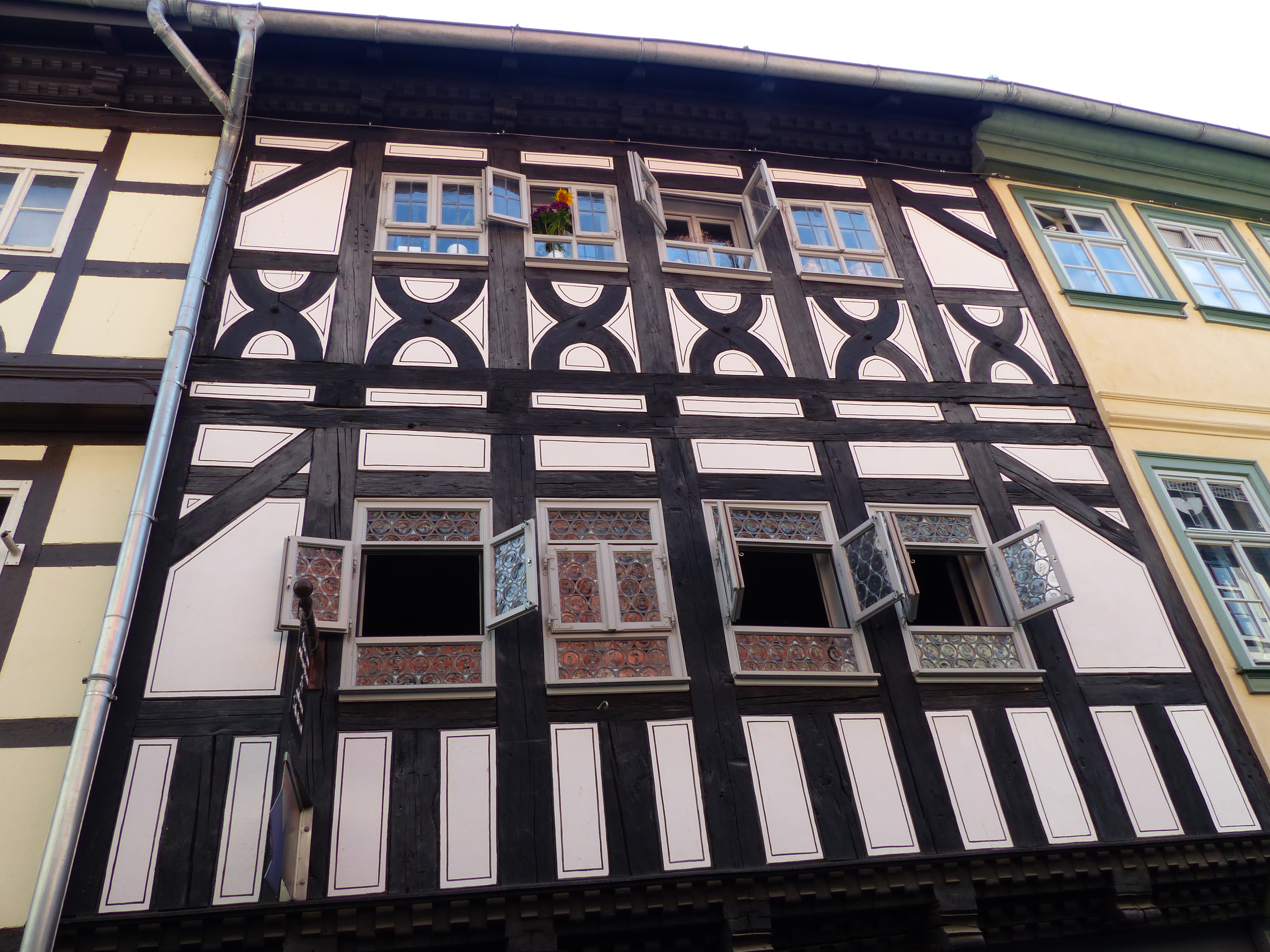
Half-timbered framework and leadlight windows

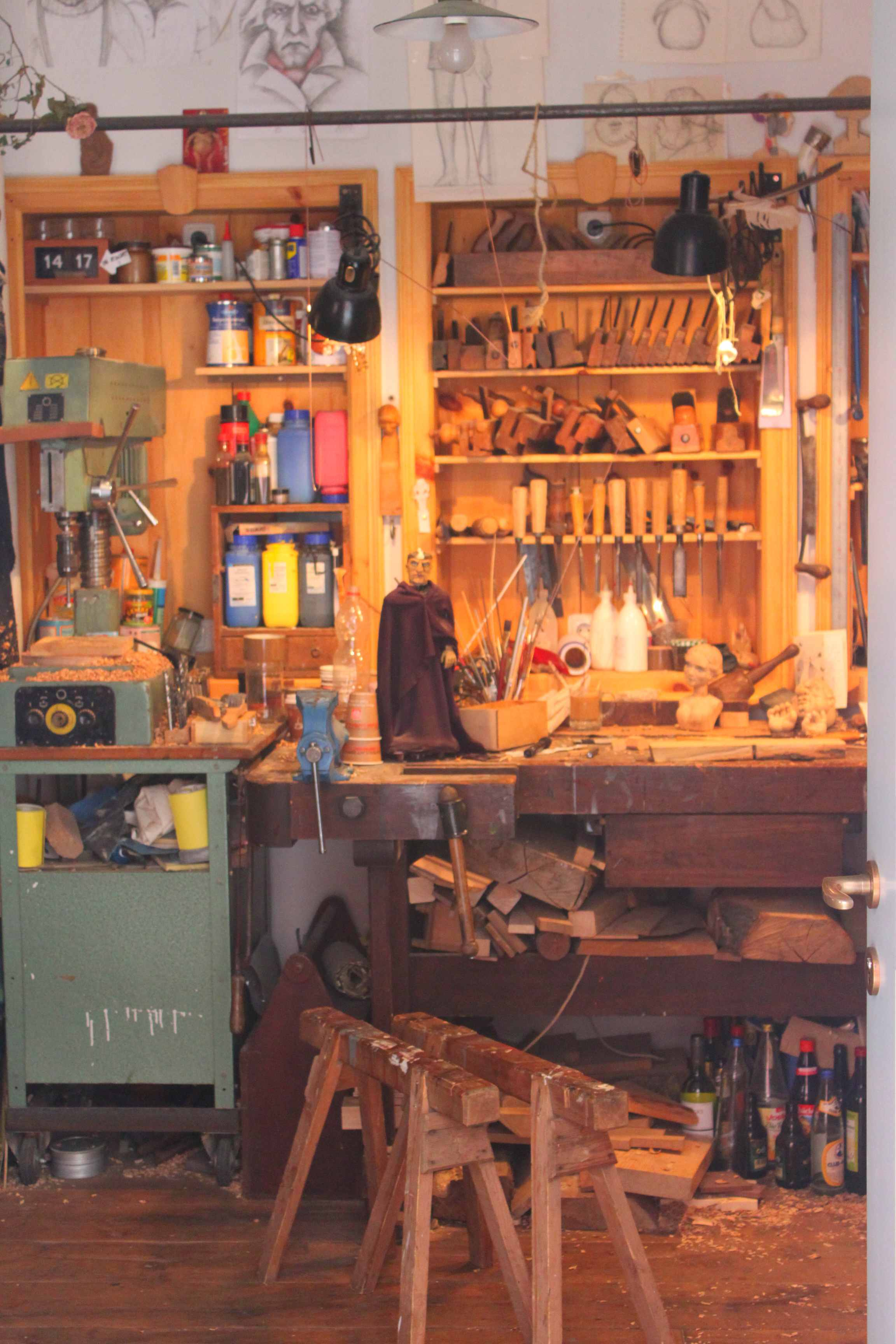
Inside the puppetmakers workshop, Krämerbrücke

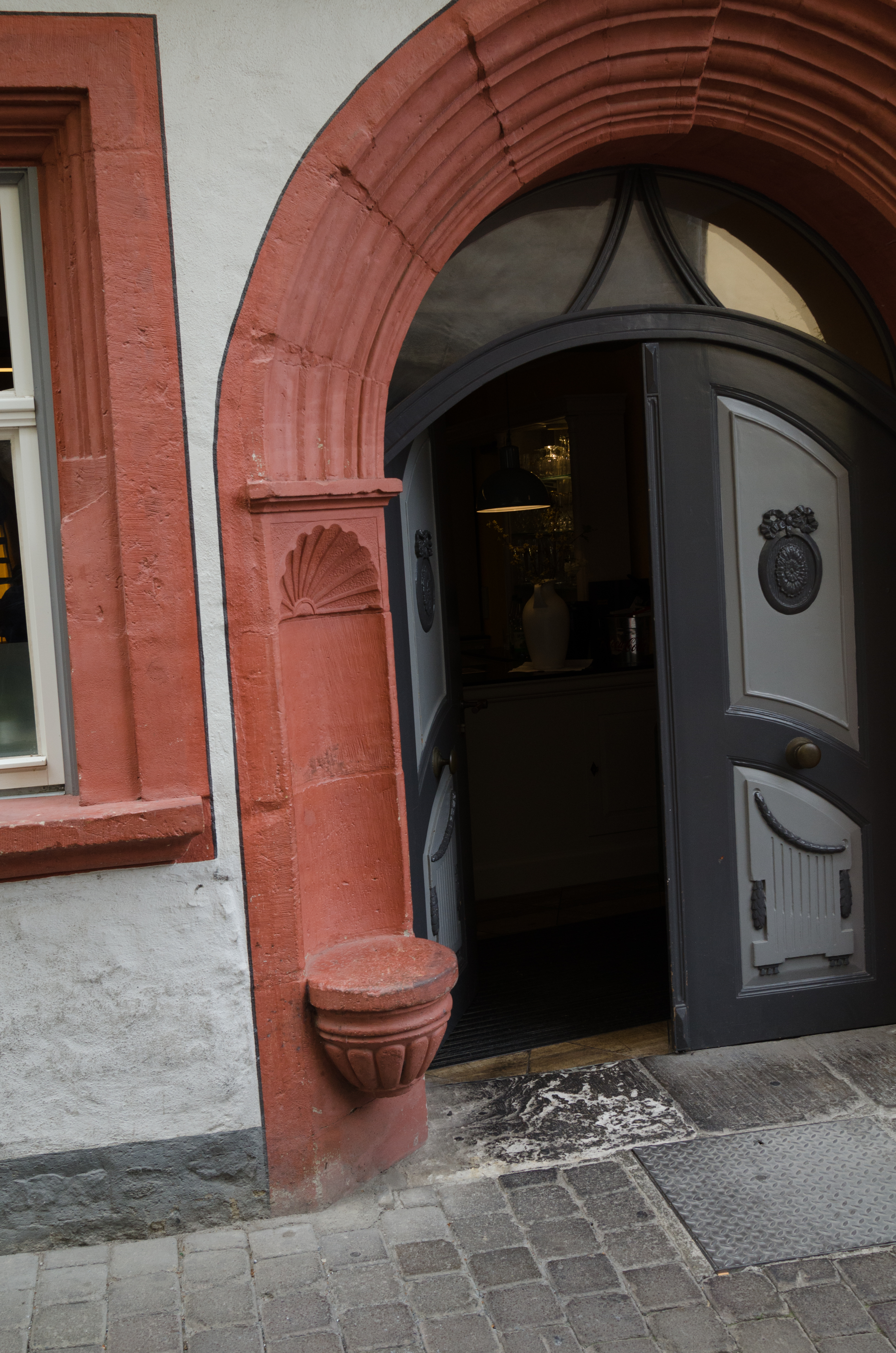
Doorway (c. 1560); door (c. 1800), Krämerbrücke

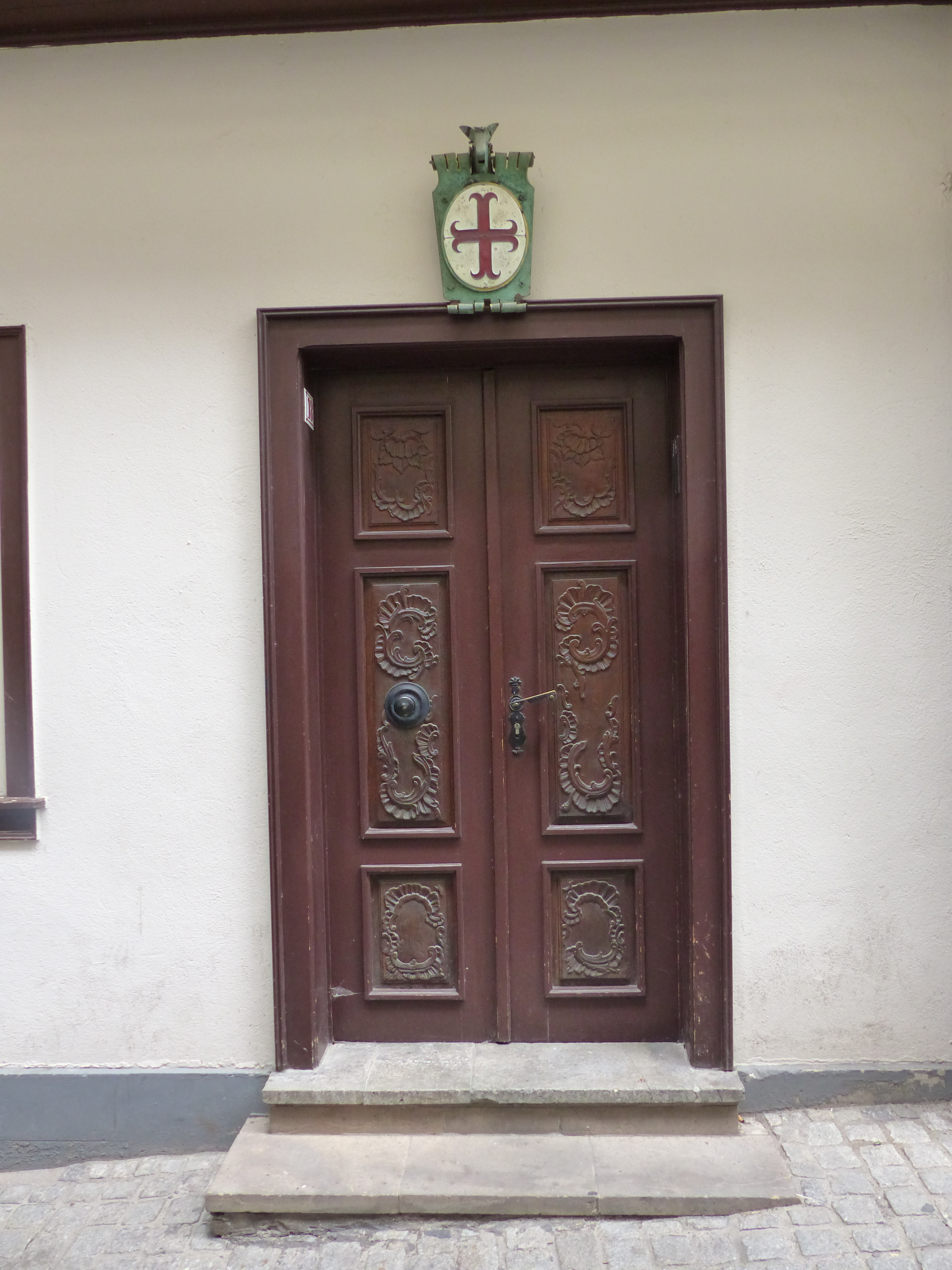
Krämerbrücke, door with house sign

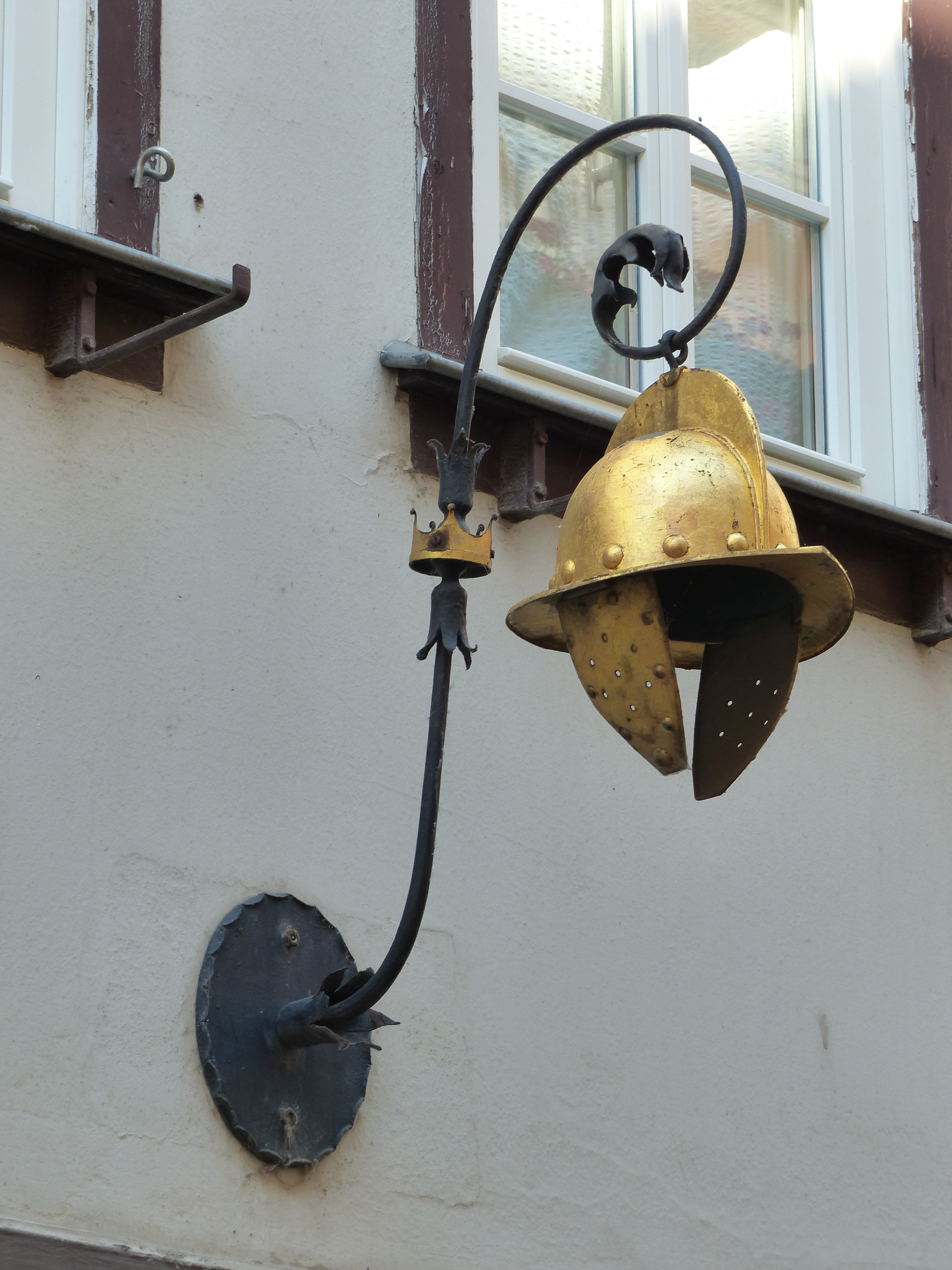
Krämerbrücke, Goldhelm's house sign

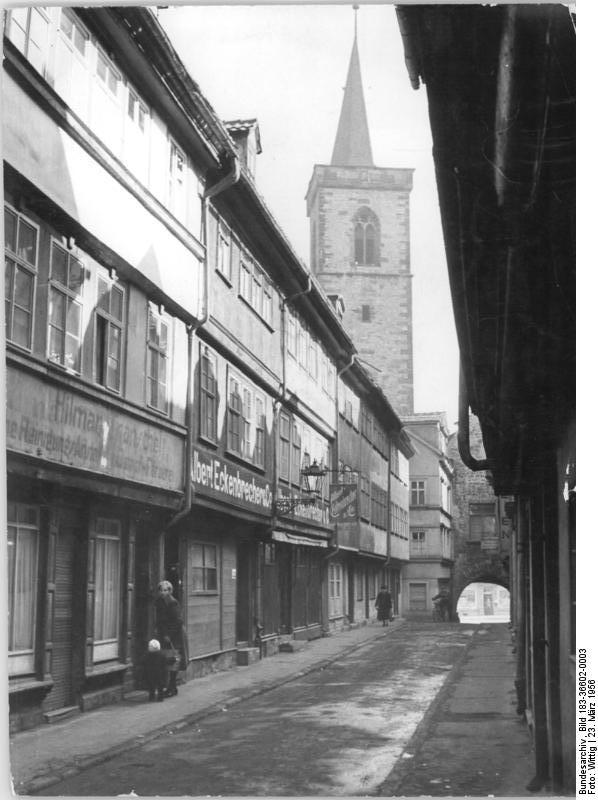
Krämerbrücke street view, 1956

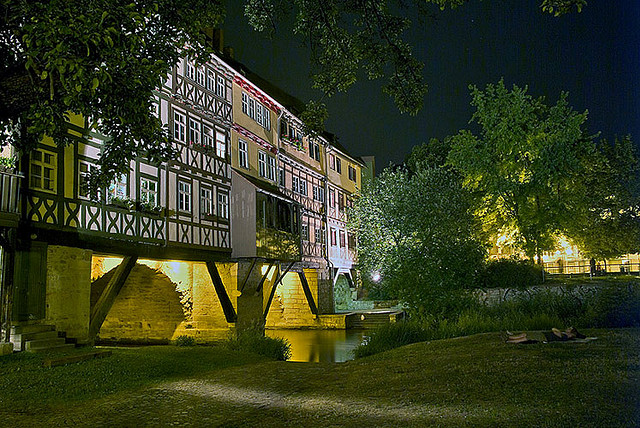
Krämerbrücke at night

== See also ==
- List of medieval stone bridges in Germany
- List of bridges in Germany
- Ponte Vecchio
- Pulteney Bridge
- Rialto Bridge

== Bibliography ==
- Baumbach, Dietrich; Vockrodt; Hans-Jörg (2000) Historische Bogen- und Gewölbebrücken der Stadt Erfurt pp 50–55. Berlin: Habel Verlag ISBN 3-00-006938-0.
- Sander, Eberhard; Thiemar, Antje; Müller, Gitta (1999) Krämerbrücke Erfurt. In: Steinbrücken in Deutschland. Erkrath: Verlag Bau + Technik ISBN 3-7640-0389-8, pp. 392–402.
- Zimpel, Egon; Stiftung Krämerbrücke Arbeitsgruppe Kunst & Künstler der Krämerbrücke (1998) Kunst & Künstler der Krämerbrücke. [Erfurt]: Druck Heyder Gehren
- Erfurt: Zu Besuch auf der Krämerbrücke in Monumente: Magazin für Denkmalkultur in Deutschland - vol 16. (2006) Nr. 1/2. Pößneck: GGP Media
- Ranglack, Klaus; Hans-Peter Brachmanski (1999) Die Erfurter Krämerbrücke und ihre Feste. Erfurt: Verlagshaus Thüringen ISBN 978-3-8968-3136-1
- Kaiser, Gerhard (1998) Die Krämerbrücke in Erfurt. Lindenberg: Kunstverlag Fink ISBN 3-9318-2068-8
- Dost, Hans J (Author); Zimpel, Egon (Illustrator) (2003) Ein Sommer mit dem Brückenkater Franz: Geschichten von der Erfurter Krämerbrücke. Bonn: Deutsche Stiftung Denkmalschutz ISBN 978-3-9369-4241-5 (A children's book set on the Krämerbrücke.)
- Herz, Andrea (2015) Stadtgucker Erfurt, Krämerbrücke. Erfurt: Herzformat ISBN 978-3-9461-6401-2
- Stade, Heinz, et al. (2011) Damit Vergangenheit Zukunft hat pp 4–5. Erfurt: Deutsche Stiftung Denkmalschutz
- Vockrodt, Hans-Jörg; Baumbach, Dietrich (2004) Brücken und Stege im alten Erfurt. Erfurt: Hans-Jörg Vockrodt und Dietrich Baumbach. Mit freundlich Unterstützung durch die Erfurter Gleisbau GmbH und den Verein Historische Brücken in Erfurt e.V.
