= Tauber Bridge, Rothenburg ob der Tauber =

Historic road bridge in Germany

Coordinates: 49°22′22″N 10°10′35″E

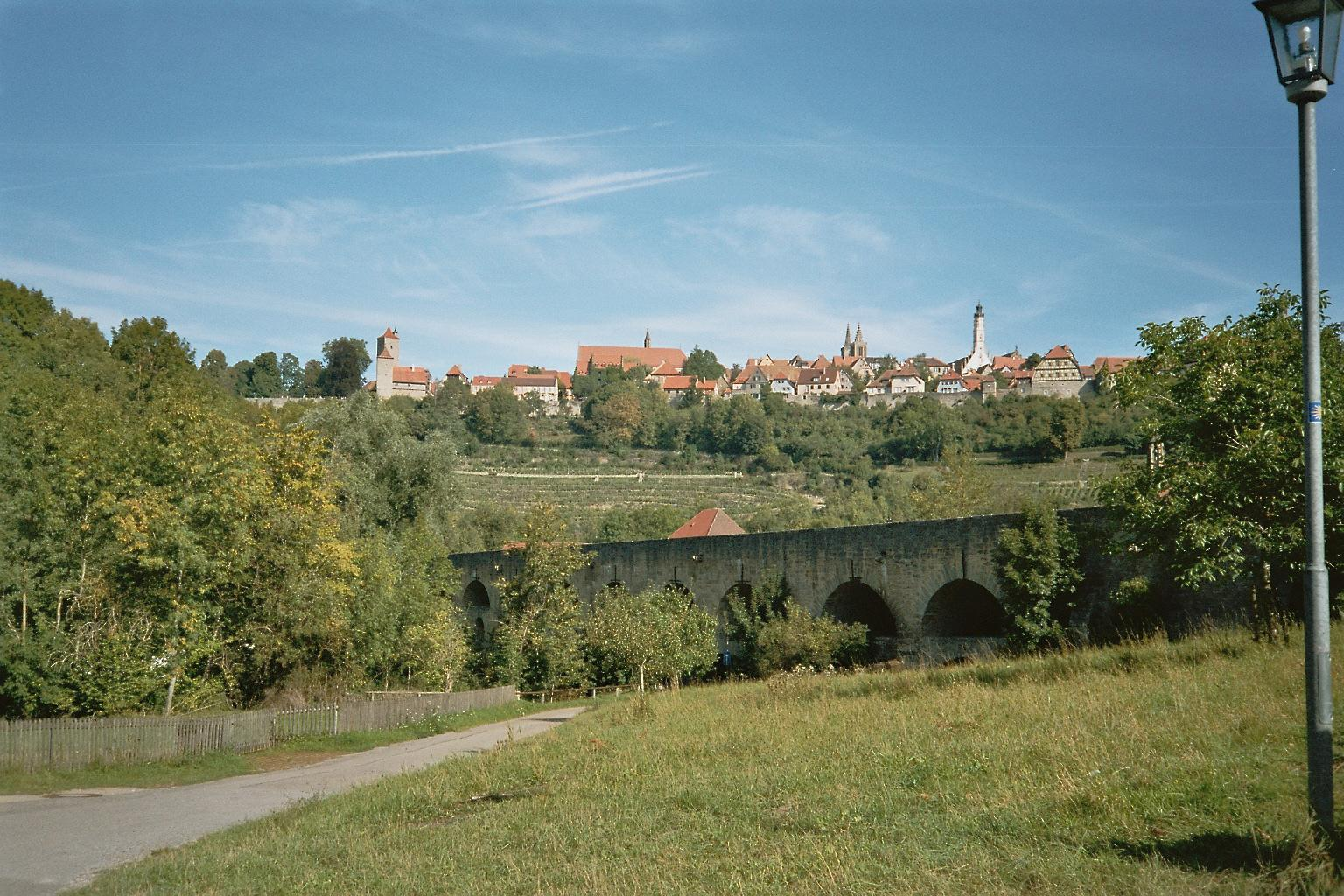
The Tauber Bridge at Rothenburg ob der Tauber

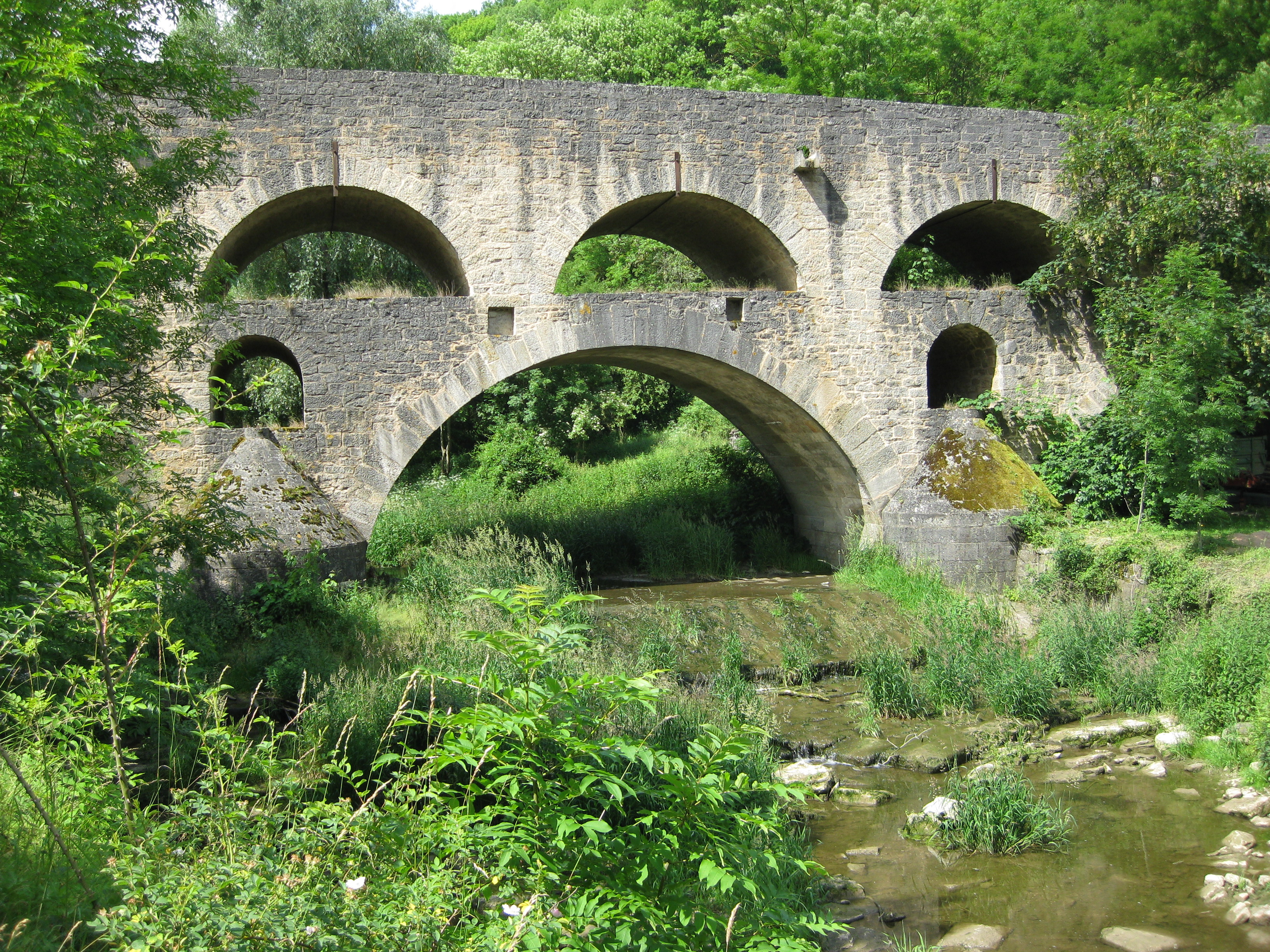
The Tauber Bridge from the valley

The Tauber Bridge at Rothenburg ob der Tauber is an historic road bridge that spans the Tauber Valley west of the town centre of the Middle Franconian town of Rothenburg ob der Tauber in Bavaria. The structure carries a local link road to Leuzenbronn and the Tauber Valley Way and has a 4.0 metre wide roadway and a 1.0 metre wide footpath.

== History ==
The double bridge with its two rows of arches, one on top of the other, was probably built around 1330. It lies at the foot of the southwestern valley side below Rothenburg ob der Tauber and was part of a trade route from Augsburg to Würzburg. In terms of building activity, it is known that it was renovated in 1791, after the four upper arches had collapsed the year before. In 1925, the eastern approach to the bridge was widened and, twenty years later. In 1945, the structure was blown up by German troops. Rebuilding commenced in 1955, and took a good year. The rebuilt bridge was opened on 10 November 1956.

== See also ==
- List of medieval stone bridges in Germany
- List of bridges in Germany
- List of bridges

== Sources ==
- Michael Severini: Tauberbrücke Rothenburg ob der Tauber (Doppelbrücke). In: Steinbrücken in Deutschland. Beton-Verlag Düsseldorf 1988, ISBN 3-7640-0240-9, S. 131–133.
