= Heidelberg Bridge Monkey =

15th-century stone statue in Heidelberg

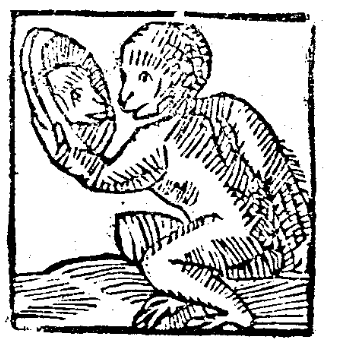
Drawing of the Heidelberg Bridge Monkey from the year 1620

The Heidelberg Bridge Monkey dates back to the 15th century. It was a stone statue sitting in the tower of the Old Bridge, which was located opposite Heidelberg's Old Town. The purpose of the tower was to instill fear and respect in anyone arriving in the town, while the monkey represented mockery. The statue was destroyed with the tower during the Nine Years' War.

Touching his bare backside, the monkey showed the Electoral Palatinate Greeting to passers-by. His backside was pointed towards the town of Mainz, which was situated opposite the river bank, and thus, the greeting was addressed to the Bishops of Mainz. The people of Heidelberg wanted to demonstrate that the Bishops in Mainz held no power over the Electors of the Palatinate. The intention of the mirror in the monkey's hand was to encourage people to engage in critical self-reflection.

A poem written by Martin Zeiller in the 17th century can still be seen beside today's version of the monkey:

"Why are you staring at me?
Haven't you seen the old monkey in Heidelberg?
Look around and you probably will see –
more monkeys like me!"

== Bronze statue ==
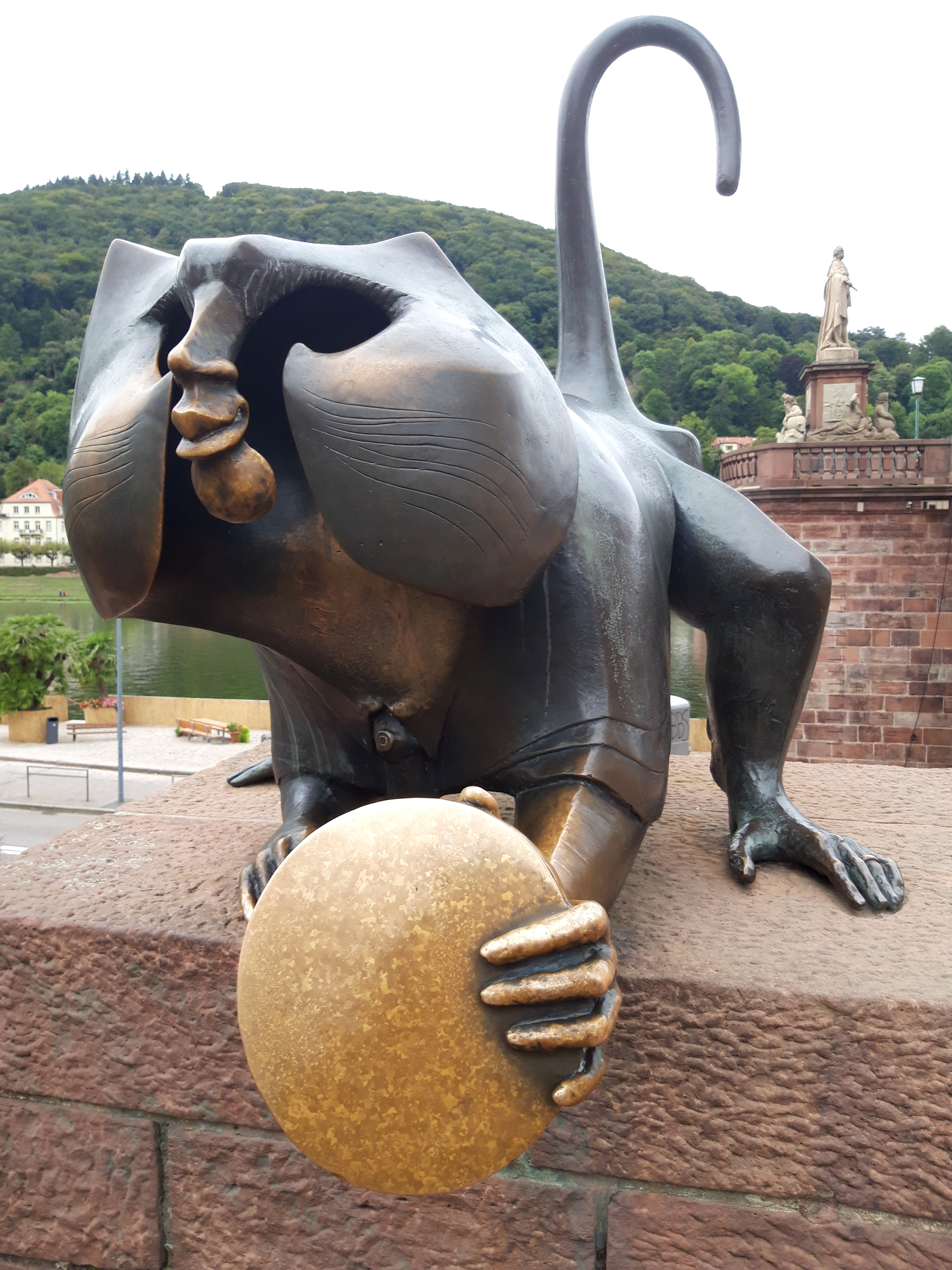
Heidelberg Bridge Monkey statue

Upon the wish of the association Alt-Heidelberg, Gernot Rumpf designed a bronze statue of the monkey with a hollow head in 1977. It was then installed at the Old Bridge next to the tower in 1979. In contrast to its predecessors, the monkey's right hand does not grasp its posterior, but shows the sign of the horns, which is supposed to ward off the evil eye.

Today, the statue is a popular tourist attraction. It is said that if a visitor touches the sign of horns, they will return to Heidelberg. If a visitor touches the mirror, they will become wealthy, and if they touch the mice next to the monkey, they will have many children.

== Plush toy ==
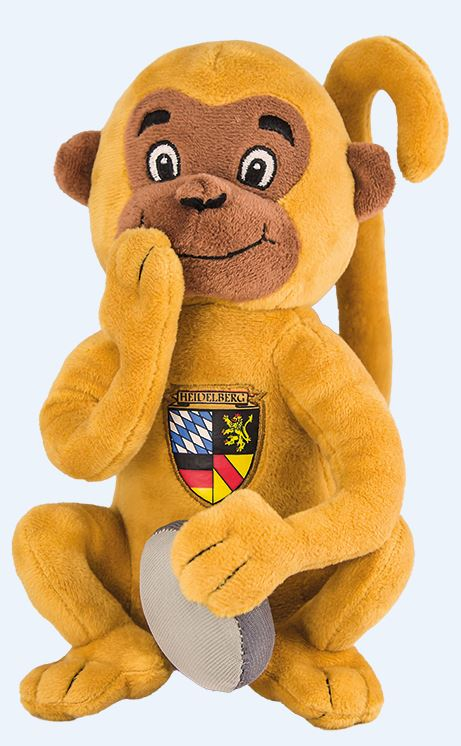
Heidelberg Bridge Monkey plush toy

A plush toy of the monkey has been available for purchase since May 2016. There are two versions of it with different sizes, which can be obtained in several shops in Heidelberg Old Town. Since the plush toy is intended for children, the monkey does not grasp its posterior or show the sign of horns. Instead, it touches its mouth. The monkey's chest is labeled with the city's name, beneath which there is a coat of arms, which is a combination of the coat of arms of Electoral Palatinate, the coat of arms of Baden and the flag of Germany.
