= Old Bridge (Heidelberg) =

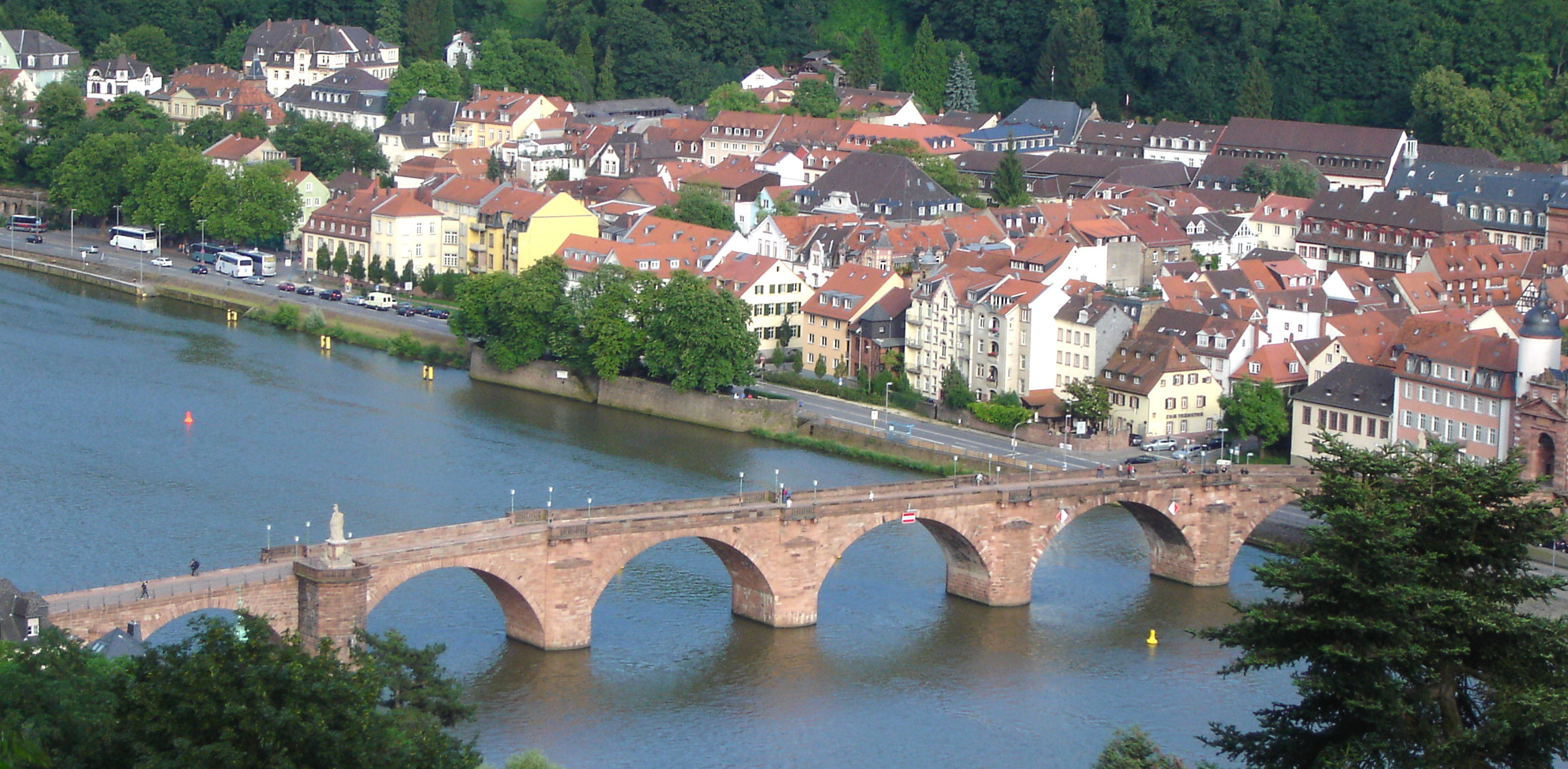
- The Old Bridge, spanning the Neckar
- Coordinates: 49.414338°N 8.70954°E
- Crosses: Neckar River
- Locale: Heidelberg: – north side: Neuenheim – south side: The Old City
- Official name: Karl Theodor Bridge (Karl-Theodor-Brücke)
- Followed by: Theodor-Heuss-Brücke

Characteristics
- Total length: 656 feet (200 m)
- Height: 23 feet (7 m)

History
- Opened: 1788

Location
- Interactive map of Old Bridge

The Karl Theodor Bridge (German: Karl-Theodor-Brücke), commonly known as the Old Bridge (Alte Brücke), is an arch bridge in Heidelberg that crosses the Neckar river. It connects the Old City with the eastern part of the Neuenheim district of the city on the opposite bank. The current bridge, made of Neckar sandstone and the ninth built on the site, was constructed in 1788 by Elector Charles Theodore, and is one of the best-known landmarks and tourist destinations in Heidelberg.

== History ==
Although the Karl Theodor Bridge was completed nearly 250 years ago, it is young compared to the age of Heidelberg. The nickname "Old Bridge" dates from the construction of the Theodor Heuss Bridge in 1877 (then known as the Friedrichs Bridge). Since the thirteenth century there have been eight bridges on the site; the current bridge is built on their foundations. The bridge gate (German: Brückentor) at the south end of the bridge also dates from the Middle Ages.

On March 29, 1945, German troops blew up three of the bridge’s arches and two of its pillars, features that were restored after the end of World War II.

=== Precursors ===
The Romans built the first bridge in the region of what is now Heidelberg in the first century CE. This wooden pile bridge, located between what are now the districts of Neuenheim and Bergheim, was rebuilt in stone around the year 200. After the Roman bridge collapsed Heidelberg was without a bridge for nearly a thousand years.

The next mention of a bridge over the Neckar is in 1284. Although the exact date of construction is unknown, it is believed to have been built shortly after the foundation of the city of Heidelberg in the late twelfth or early thirteenth century. The bridge was positioned on the site of the current one, directly aligned with the marketplace. As well as connecting the town with Schönau Abbey, the bridge may have encouraged north-south traffic to pass through Heidelberg, rather than around it. The bridge marked the border of the County Palatinate of the Rhine, as the northern bank of the Neckar belonged to the Electorate of Mainz until 1460. The bridge therefore formed part of Heidelberg's defenses, secured by the gate on its southern end.

The first bridge was destroyed by an ice floe in 1288, with several other bridges meeting the same fate after brief life spans. The second bridge was destroyed by an ice flow in 1308, the third in 1340, the fourth around 1400 and the fifth in 1470. Although there are no surviving depictions of these first five bridges, there are two depictions of the sixth by Sebastian Münster, hence its nickname, 'the Münster bridge' (German: Münster-Brücke). A small, round woodcut in Münster's 1527 Calendarium Hebraicum shows a simple view of Heidelberg, including the bridge, but there is a much more detailed depiction in the artist's Cosmographia of 1550. In the Heidelberg Panorama a bridge on eight stone pillars is visible, with a covered wooden roadway that is open at the sides. The two towers of the bridge gate can be made out at the southern end of the bridge, while the monkey tower (Affenturm) is on the seventh pillar, towards the north end of the bridge.

On the 2 February 1565 an ice floe destroyed the bridge's covered wooden roadway. The seventh bridge, built on the surviving stone pillars, was known as the "Merian Bridge" (Merian-Brücke), due to its prominence in Matthäus Merian's 1620 engraving of the city. Its appearance was similar to that of its predecessors, except that the span was covered between the monkey tower and the newly constructed Renaissance tower. The bridge survived the conquest of Heidelberg by Johann Tserclaes in 1622 during the Thirty Years' War unscathed, but was demolished on 2 March 1689 by the French under Mélac during the first destruction of the city in the Nine Years' War.

In the stead of a permanent bridge, Heidelbergers used pontoon bridges and river ferries for nearly 20 years. Construction on the eighth bridge finally began in 1786 and lasted for two years. To provide footing, the old pillars were repaired and the bridge was built laterally, again out of wood. The Affenturm was rebuilt in smaller scale at the northern gate, allowing barracks to be built on the second and seventh piers, where the statues of Karl Theodor and Minerva now stand. This bridge also had two stone arches spanning from the river back and between both guardhouses that was retained in the modern bridge. The towers of the bridge gate that survived 1689 were fitted with canopy roofs in 1714. In 1738, a statue of John of Nepomuk was erected on the Neuenstadt side of the bridge, earning the eighth bridge the name "Nepomuk bridge" (Nepomuk Brücke).

== Affenturm ==
As early as the 15th century there has been a statue of a monkey on the Old Bridge holding a mirror, which disappeared during the Nine Years' War. The current statue was designed by Gernot Rumpf and erected in 1979. The statue holds a mirror in one hand and forms the sign of the horns with the other. Below the monkey is a poem by Martin Zeiler written in 1632, reading,

Why are you staring at me?
Haven't you seen the old Monkey of Heidelberg?
Look to and fro,
There you will find many more of my kind.

(Was thustu mich hie angaff en?
Hastu nicht gesehen den alten Affen zu Heydelberg?
Sich dich hin und her,
Da findestu wol meines gleichen mehr.)

Tourists can place their heads within the monkey's head. Local legend has it that rubbing the mirror brings good luck, rubbing the fingers ensure a return to Heidelberg, and the little bronze-cast mice nearby bring fertility.

== See also ==
- List of medieval stone bridges in Germany
- List of bridges in Germany
