= St Giles' Church, Erfurt =

St Giles' Church
- German: Ägidienkirche
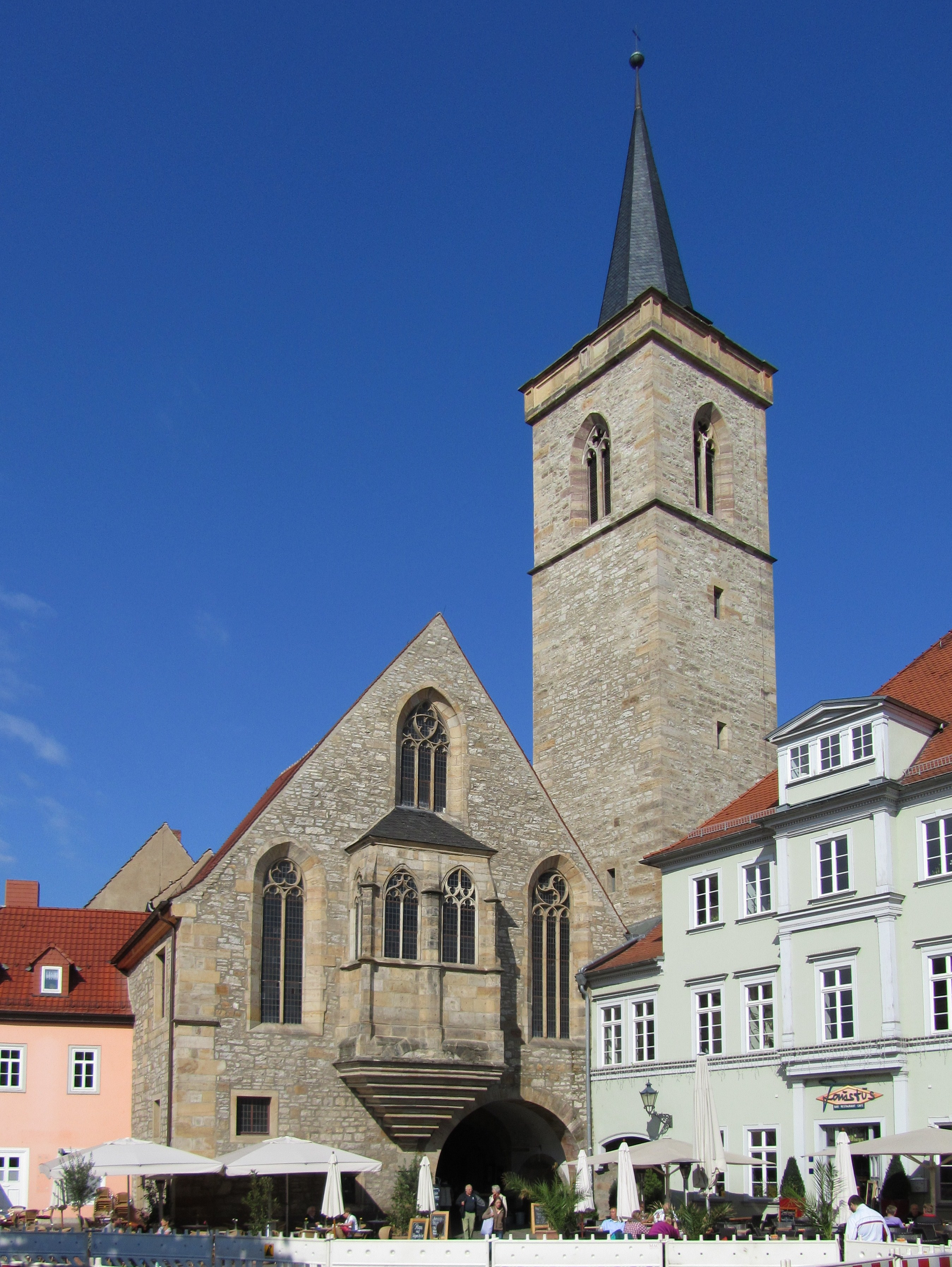
- View from Wenigemarkt

- Location in Germany
- 50.9787377°N 11.0316616°E
- Location: Erfurt, Thuringia
- Country: Germany
- Denomination: United Methodist Church
- Previous denomination: Roman Catholic, Lutheran

History
- Dedication: Saint Giles

Architecture
- Heritage designation: Kulturdenkmal in Thuringia
- Style: Gothic
- Completed: 1325

St Giles' Church (German: Ägidienkirche, also St. Ägidii) in the historical centre of the city of Erfurt in Thuringia, Germany, forms the eastern entrance from Wenigemarkt (Minor Market) to the Krämerbrücke (Merchants' Bridge) with its archway. The single-nave Gothic church building is one of the former two bridgehead churches. At the western end stood the Benediktikirche (St Benedict's Church) since the 11th century, which was demolished in 1890 and is now only remembered by the name of Benediktsplatz (St Benedict's Square).

== History ==
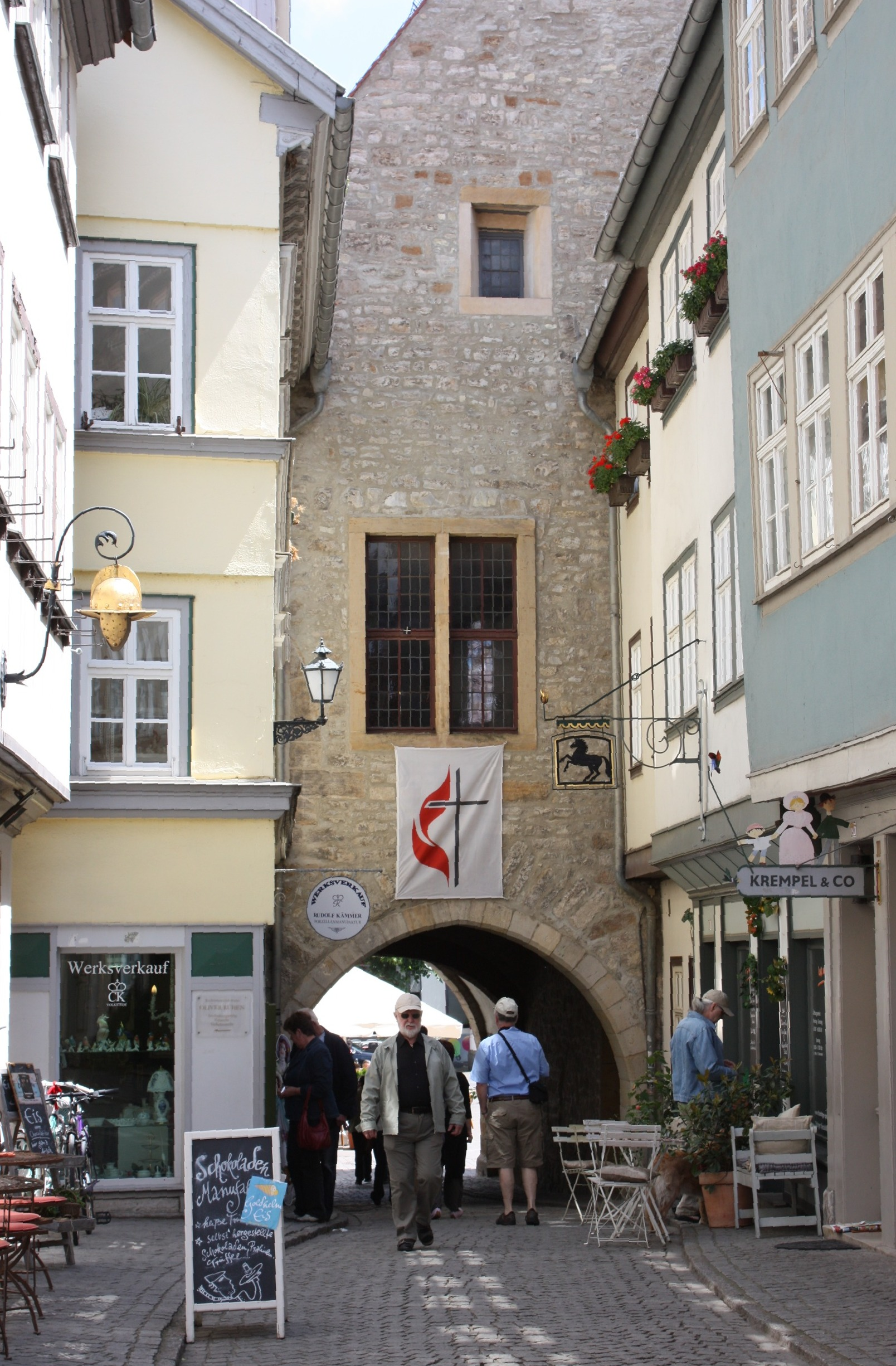
View from Krämerbrücke

St Giles' Church was mentioned as early as 1110 as capella s. aegidii confessoris. After the destruction of the bridge and the church by a fire in 1293, it was rebuilt as a rubble stone structure and completed in 1325. It was built primarily for merchant travellers. In the Middle Ages, the ground floor was an open hall and served as a salesroom; the nave is one storey higher. In 1382, the Ägidiusglocke (St Giles' Bell) was cast; after the Katharina bell in St Michael's Church, it is the second-oldest bell in the city of Erfurt.

After several changes of patronage until the Reformation in 1525, the church belonged to the monks of the Schottenkloster (Scots monastery) and then to the Kaufmannsgemeinde (congregation of Merchants' Church). Services were discontinued in 1615, the church was leased to a merchant for profane purposes in 1657 and sold in 1827, to be partly used as a warehouse. The ground floor housed a shop, the doorways of which were uncovered during renovation work. In 1927, the building was reacquired as a tenement and since its restoration from 1957 to 1960, it has once again been used as a place of worship by the United Methodist Church. It is the oldest church in the world used by Methodists and has been owned by the Evangelisch-methodistische Kirche in Ostdeutschland (United Methodist Church in East Germany) since 1957. In 2000 and 2002, it was restored with the support of the German Foundation for Monument Protection.

The church interior is on the first floor, with the choir in the late Gothic oriel window. The archway forms the eastern entrance to the Krämerbrücke. From the tower of the church, which has 128 steps, there is a good view over the roofscape of the Krämerbrücke to Erfurt's landmarks, the Domplatz (Cathedral Square) with St Mary's Cathedral and St Severus' Church, as well as the panorama of the Petersberg Citadel. The 33-metre-high (108 ft 3 in) church tower is also known as the Roter Turm ("Red Tower") and is open to visitors every day.

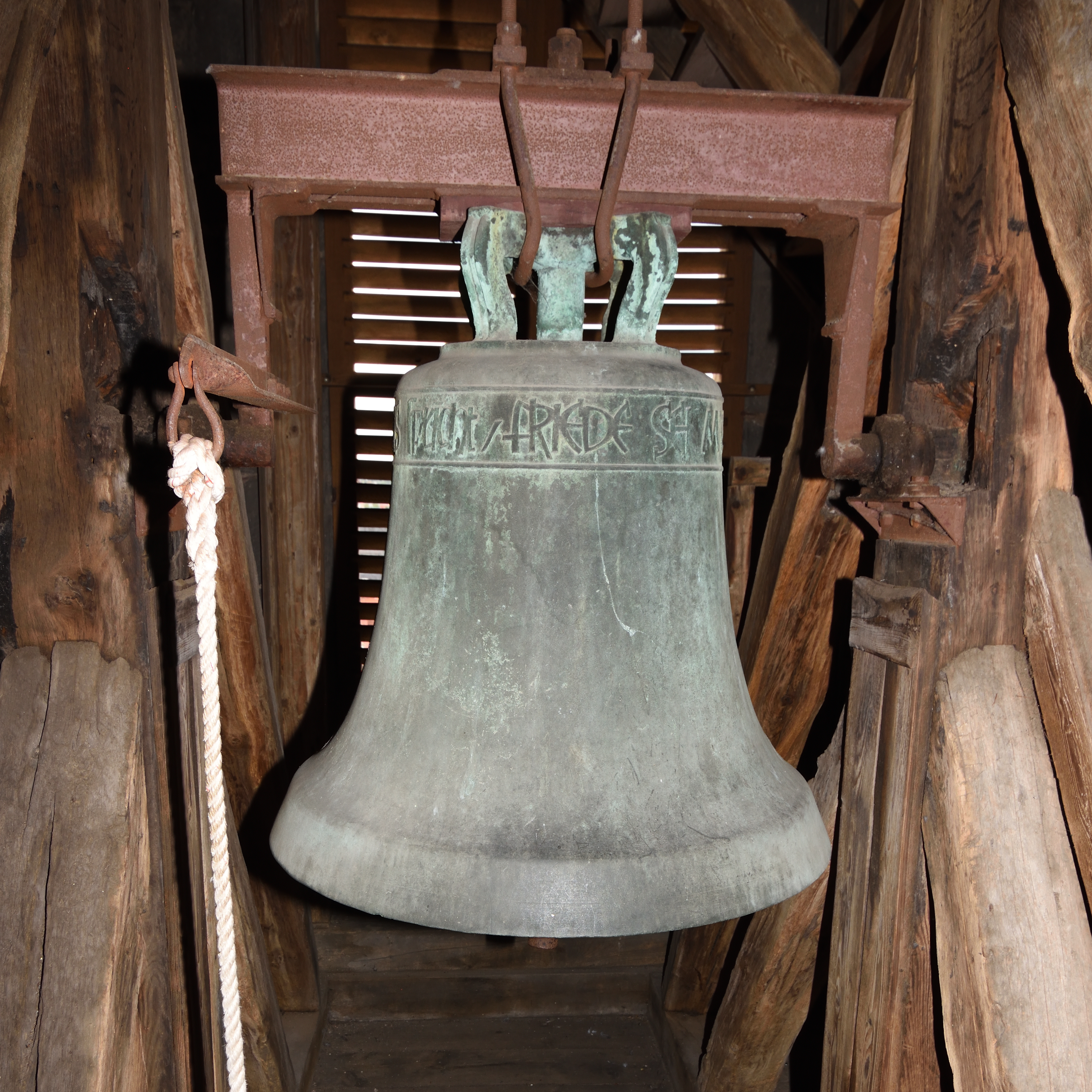
One of the bells

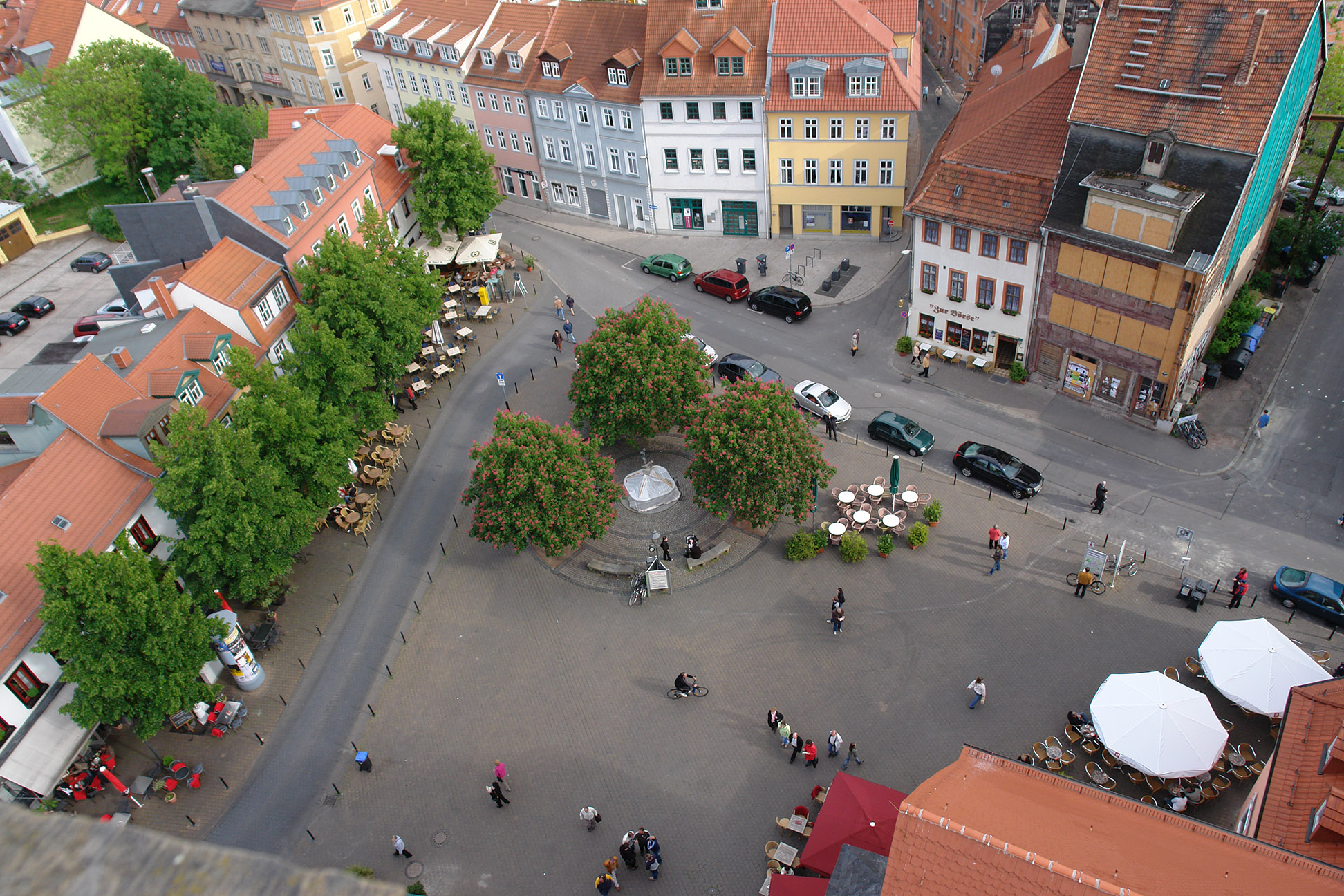
View of Wenigemarkt from the tower

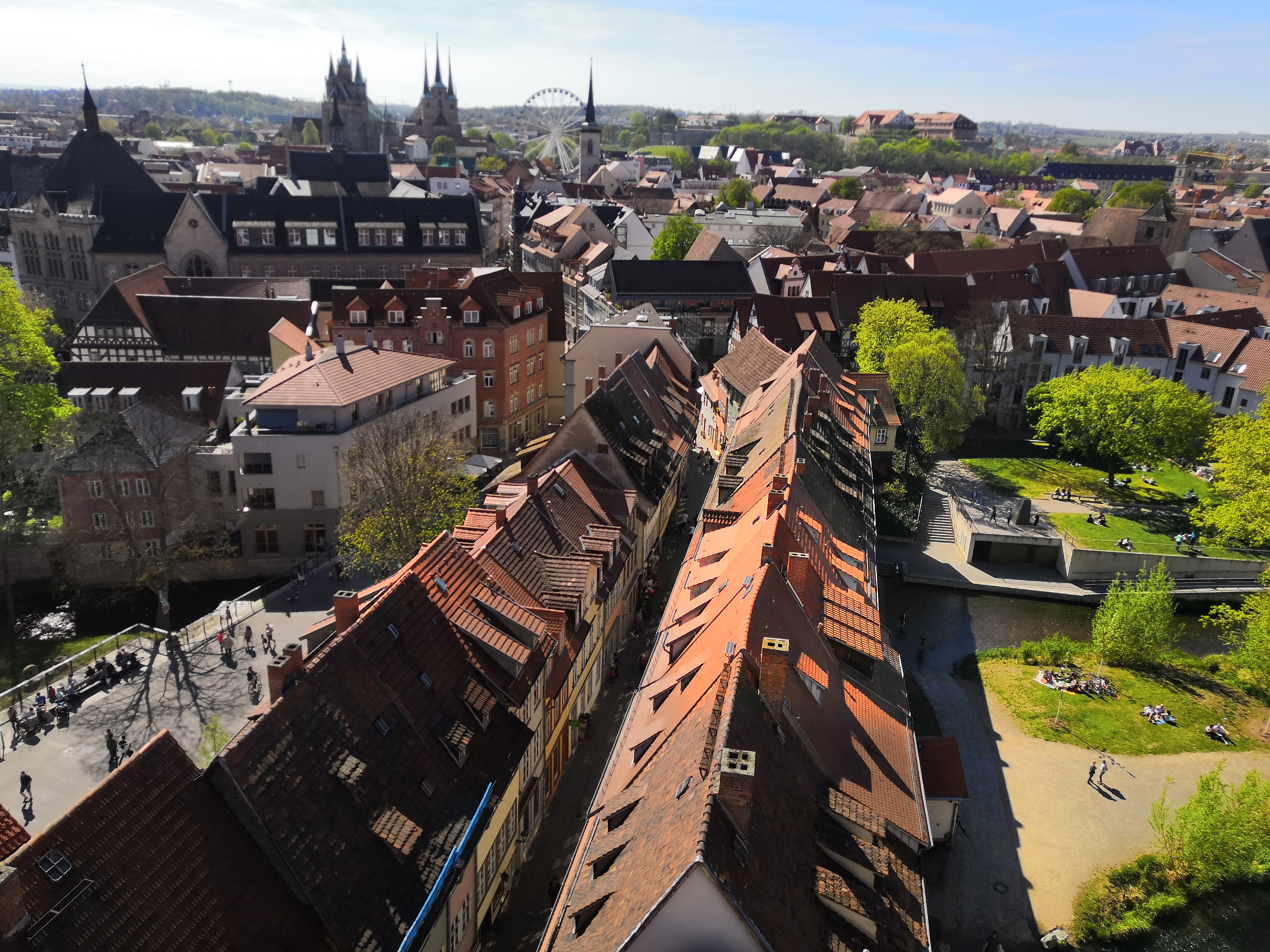
View of Krämerbrücke from the tower
