= Breitstrom =

River in Germany

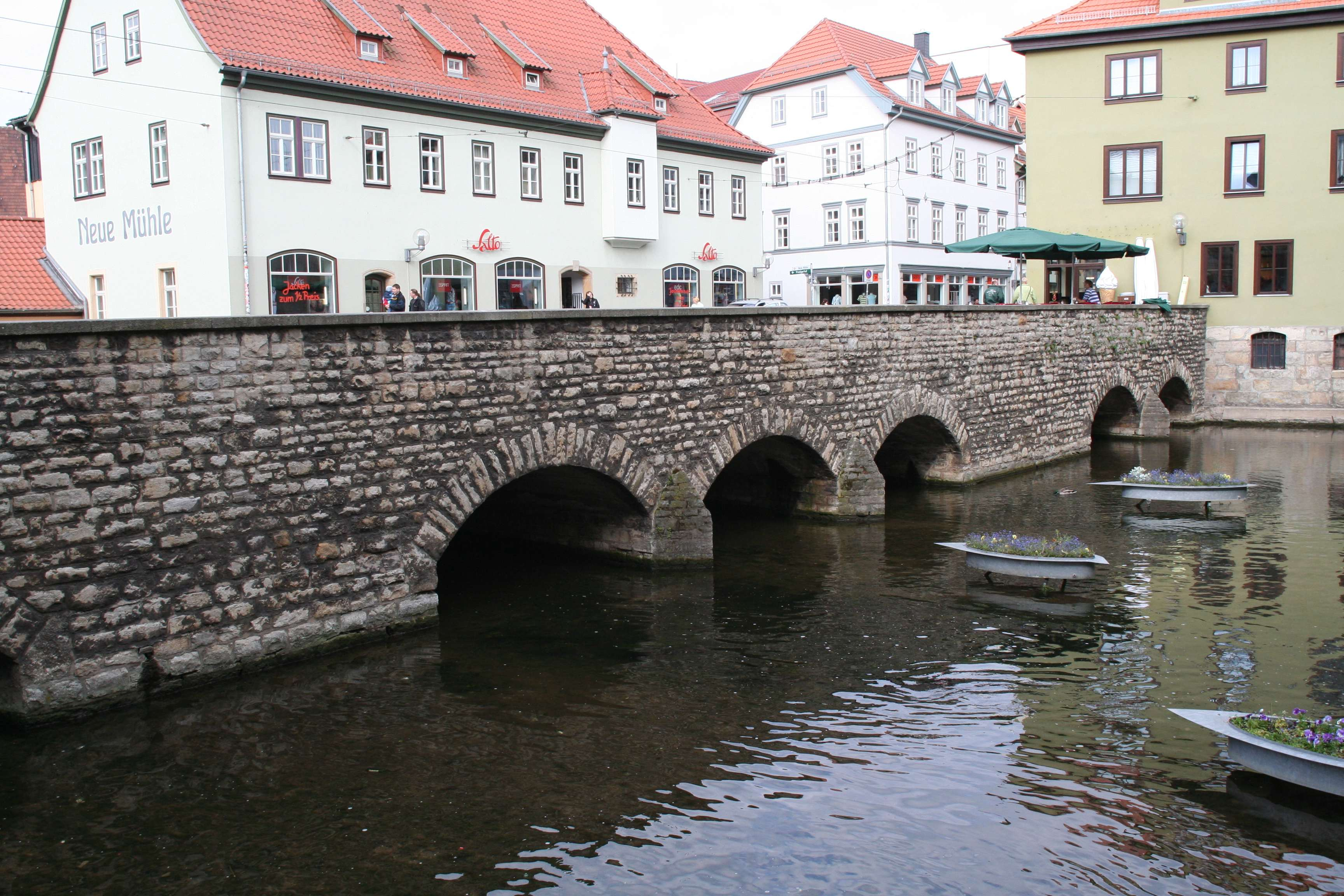
- The Breitstrom at the Schlösserbrücke

Location
- Country: Germany
- State: Thuringia

Basin features
- River system: Unstrut

The Breitstrom is a branch of the river Gera in the old part of the city of Erfurt, Thuringia, central Germany.

== See also ==
- List of rivers of Thuringia
