= Homiletics =

Application of rhetoric to public preaching

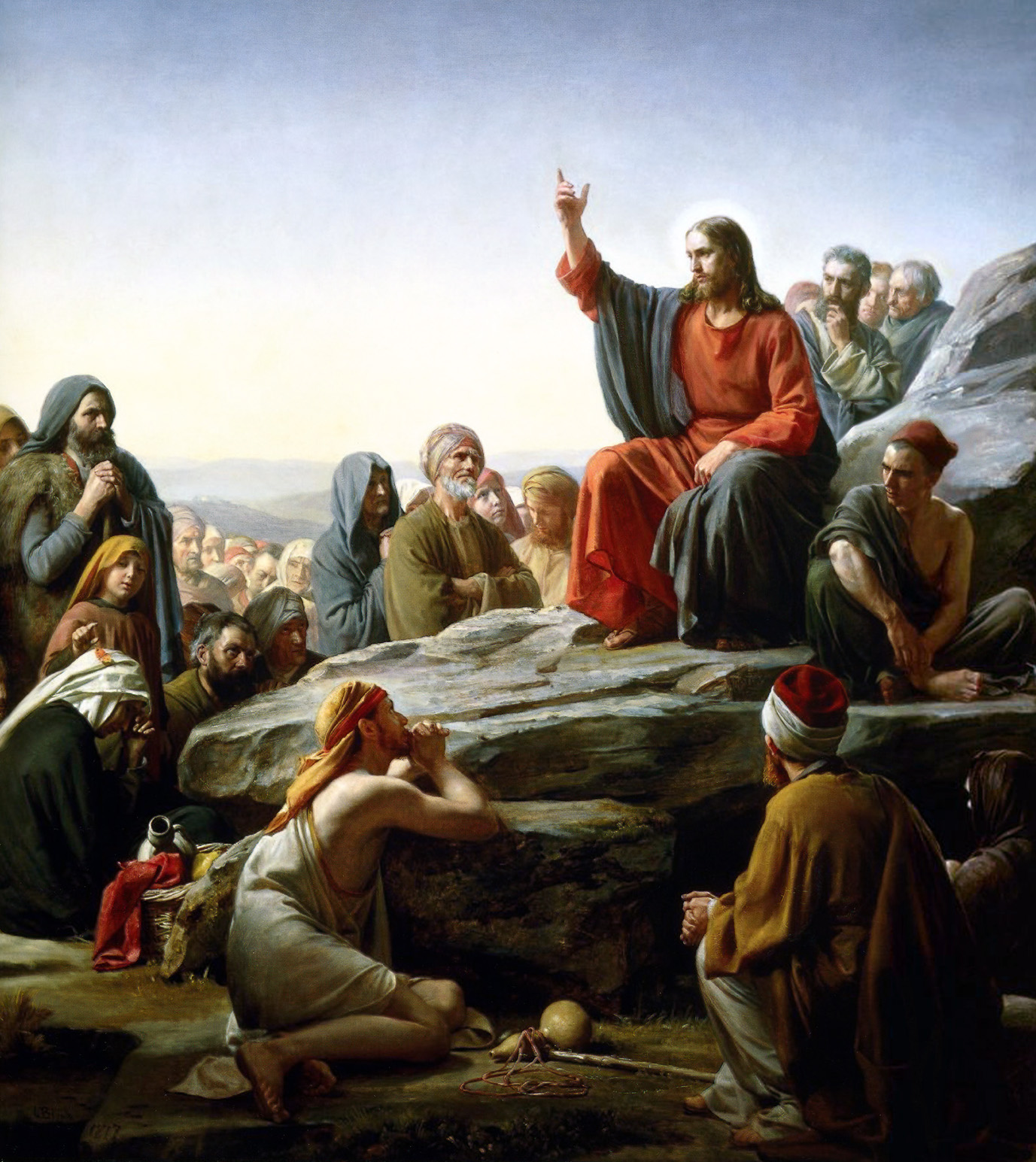
The Sermon on the Mount by Carl Heinrich Bloch, Danish painter

In religious studies, homiletics (Ancient Greek: ὁμιλητικός homilētikós, from homilos, "assembled crowd, throng") is the application of the general principles of rhetoric to the specific art of public preaching. One who practices or studies homiletics may be called a homilist, or more simply, a preacher.

== Explanation ==
Homiletics, the art of preaching, studies both the composition and the delivery of religious discourses. It includes all forms of preaching, including sermons, homilies and catechetical instruction. Homiletics may be further defined as the study of the analysis, classification, preparation, composition, and delivery of sermons.

The formation of the Lyman Beecher course at Yale University resulted in an increased emphasis on homiletics. The published volumes of this series include information regarding the history and practice of the discipline.

=== Branch of pastoral theology ===
The Catholic Encyclopedia defines homiletics as "that branch of rhetoric that treats of the composition and delivery of sermons or homilies". This definition was influential in the 19th century among thinkers like John Broadus and Karl Barth. Karl resisted this definition of the term, saying that homiletics should retain a critical distance from rhetoric. The homiletic-rhetorical relationship has been a major issue in homiletic theory since the mid-20th century.

The first form of preaching was largely the homily.

=== Christian tradition: The preaching of Jesus ===
Jesus preached and commissioned his apostles to do so. His preaching included two forms of the sermon, the missionary and the ministerial. Missionary sermons are given to outsiders and correspond the Catholic magisterium. Ministerial sermons are given to those already part of the movement, corresponding to the Catholic ministerium. For example, Jesus' Sermon on the Mount is a missionary sermon. By contrast, his discourse after the Last Supper (John 14–16) is ministerial.

It cannot be said that Jesus' preaching took any definite, rounded form, in the sense of a modern sermon. His aim was to sow the seed of the word, which he scattered abroad, like the sower in the parable. His commission to his Apostles included both missionary and ministerial sermoning. For examples of missionary sermoning, see Matthew 28:19, Mark 16:15, Mark 3:14, Luke 9:2. For examples of ministerial sermoning, see Paul the Apostle's sermon in Acts 20:7–11. In this sermon, the apostles were supported by assistants who were elected and consecrated for a purpose (e.g. Timothy and Titus). Some of these assistants had been favored with charismata.

=== Missionary preaching ===
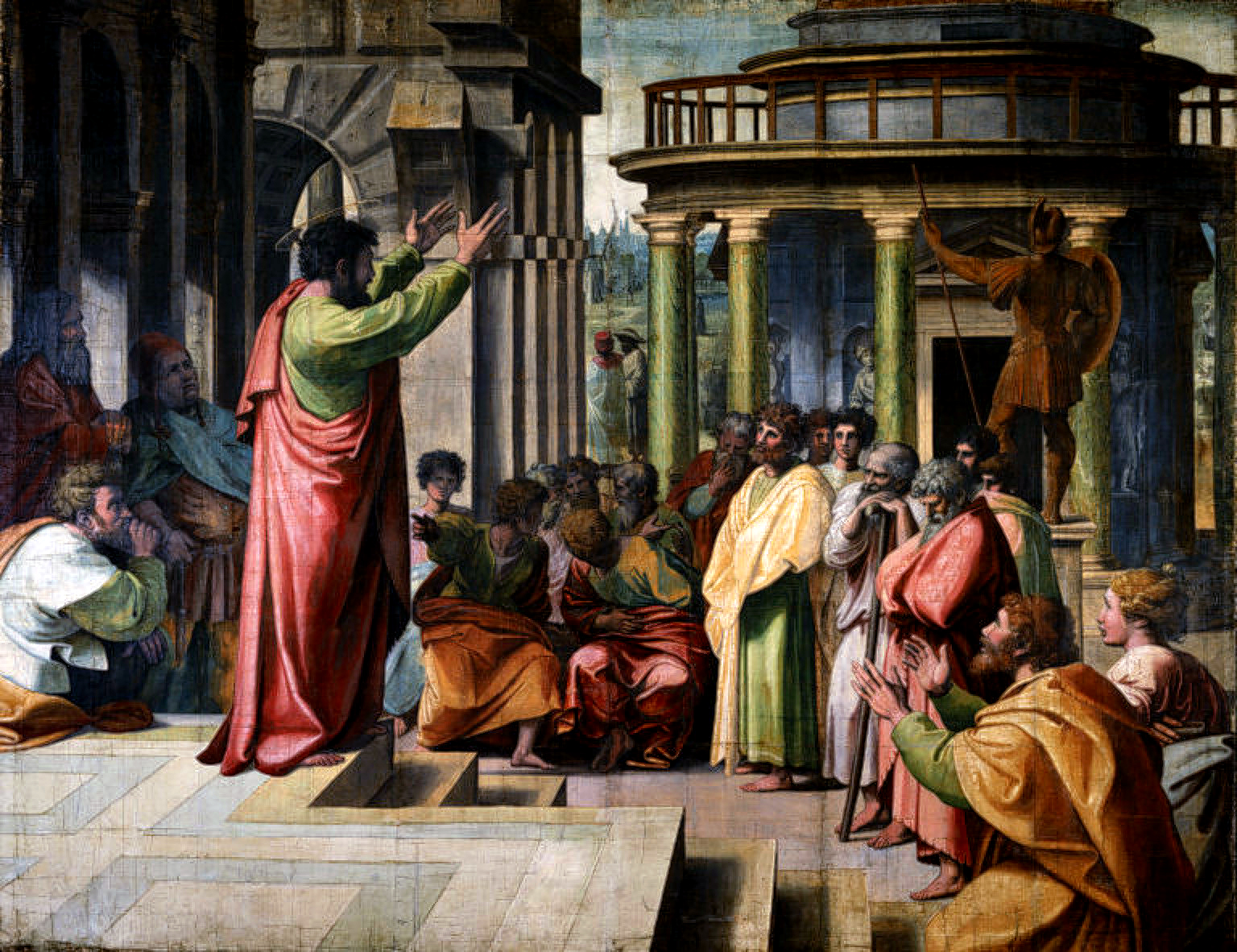
St Paul preaching his Areopagus sermon in Athens, by Raphael, 1515

In missionary preaching the apostles were also assisted, but informally, by the laity, who explained the Christian doctrine to their acquaintances amongst unbelievers who, in their visits to the Christian assemblies, must have heard something of it, e.g., cf. I Cor., xiv, 23-24. This is particularly true of Justin Martyr, who, wearing his philosopher's cloak, went about for that purpose. The sermons to the faithful in the early ages were of the simplest kind, being merely expositions or paraphrases of the passage of scripture that was read, coupled with extempore effusions of the heart. This explains why there is little or nothing in the way of sermons or homilies surviving from that period. It also explains the strange statement made by Sozomen (Hist. Eccl., VII, xix), and by Cassiodorus in his "Tripartite History", which Duchesne apparently accepts, that no one preached at Rome. (Sozomen wrote about the time of Pope Xystus III, in office 432-440) Thomassin's explanation of Sozomen's statement is that there was no preaching in the sense of an elaborate or finished discourse before the time of Pope Leo, with the exception, perhaps, of the address on virginity by Pope Liberius (in office 352-366) to Marcellina, sister of Ambrose, on the occasion of her taking the veil, which is regarded as a private discourse.

And the reason for this he attributes to the stress of persecution. Neander (I, 420, note) says of Sozomen's statement: "The remark could not extend to the early times; but suppose it did, it meant that the sermon was only secondary. Or the fact may have been that this Eastern writer was deceived by false accounts from the West, or it may have been that the sermon in the Western Church did not occupy so important a place as it did in the Greek Church."

=== Homiletics in the Jewish tradition ===
Preaching as a regular part of worship services in Judaism can be traced back to the time of Ezra, who instituted the custom of reading a portion of the Torah, written in Hebrew, and then paraphrasing or explaining it in the vernacular, which at the time was Aramaic. This tradition was well established by the fourth century BCE. After the destruction of the temple, synagogues became central to Jewish worship and the role of the sermon increased. A regular structure arose: the speaker first quoted a verse from the Bible, then expounded on it, and finally closed with a summary and a prayer of praise. Sermons from highly regarded rabbis of this period have been preserved in the Midrash, forming part of the Talmud.

Homiletics is taught as part of the typical curriculum at modern-day rabbinical seminaries.

== Early Christian church ==
According to middle second-century writer Justin Martyr, the practice of the early church was for someone to read from the "Memoirs of the Apostles or the Writings of the Prophets", meaning readings from what was to become the Christian Bible. A discourse on the text followed the reading. This was the same practice as that of the synagogues, but now with the New Testament writings added, except that in Christian churches the same person who read the scripture also explained it and there was no set lectionary of readings. Origen, a third-century theologian, preached through most books of the Old Testament and many of the New, which we have today. Origen's sermons on the scripture are expository and evangelistic. By the fourth century, a system had developed where a reading from the Law, Prophets, Epistles, and Gospels were read in that order, followed by a sermon. John Chrysostom is recognized as one of the greatest preachers of this age. His sermons begin with exegesis, followed by application to practical problems.

According to the Catholic Encyclopedia:

The office of preaching belonged to bishops, and priests preached only with their permission. Even two such distinguished men as Augustine of Hippo and John Chrysostom preached, as priests, only when commissioned by their respective bishops. Origen as a layman expounded the scriptures, but it was by special permission. Felix, a priest and martyr, preached in the third century, under two bishops, Maximus and Quintus. Priests were forbidden to preach in Alexandria; but that was on account of the Arian controversy. A custom springing from this had spread to the north of Africa; but Valerius, Bishop of Hippo, broke through it, and had St. Augustine, as yet a priest, to preach before him, because he himself was unable to do so with facility in the Latin language – "cum non satis expedite Latino sermone concionari posset". This was against the custom of the place, as Possidius relates; but Valerius justified his action by an appeal to the East – "in orientalibus ecclesiis id ex more fieri sciens". Even during the time of the prohibition in Alexandria, priests from Socrates and Sozomen, interpreted the Scriptures publicly in Cæsarea, in Cappadocia, and in Cyprus, candles being lighted the while – accensis lucernis. As soon as the Church received freedom under Constantine, preaching developed very much, at least in external form. Then for the first time, if, perhaps, we except St. Cyprian, the art of oratory was applied to preaching, especially by St. Gregory of Nazianzus, the most florid of Cappadocia's triumvirate of genius. He was already a trained orator, as were many of his hearers, and it is no wonder, as Otto Bardenhewer expresses it, "he had to pay tribute to the taste of his own time which demanded a florid and grandiloquent style". But, at the same time, he condemned those preachers who used the eloquence and pronunciation of the theatre. The most notable preachers of the century, St. Basil and the two Gregories (the "Clover-leaf of Cappadocia"), Sts. Chrysostom, Ambrose, Augustine and Hilary, were all noted orators. Of the number the greatest was St. Chrysostom, the greatest since St. Paul, nor has he been since equalled. Even Gibbon, while not doing him justice, had to praise him; and his teacher of rhetoric, Libanius, is said to have intended John as his successor, "if the Christians had not taken him". It is a mistake, however, to imagine that they preached only oratorical sermons. Quite the contrary; St. Chrysostom's homilies were models of simplicity, and he frequently interrupted his discourse to put questions in order to make sure that he was understood; while St. Augustine's motto was that he humbled himself that Christ might be exalted. In passing we might refer to a strange feature of the time, the applause with which a preacher was greeted. St. Chrysostom especially had to make frequent appeals to his hearers to keep quiet. Bishops commonly preached outside their own dioceses, especially in the great cities; polished sermons were evidently in demand, and a stipend was given, for we read that two Asiatic bishops, Antiochus and Severianus, went to Constantinople to preach, being more desirous of money than of the spiritual welfare of their hearers.

— Patrick A. Beecher, Homiletics, Catholic Encyclopedia 1913

== Decline in the West ==
After the age here described preaching was on the decline in the West, partly because of the decay of the Latin language (cf. Fénelon, "Dial.", 164), and in the East, owing to the controversies on Arianism, Nestorianism, Eutychianism, Macedonianism, and other heresies. But still preaching was regarded as the chief duty of bishops; for instance, Cæsarius, Bishop of Arles, gave charge of all the temporal affairs of his diocese to deacons, that he might devote all his time to the reading of the Scriptures, to prayer, and to preaching. The next great name in preaching is that of Gregory the Great, particularly as a homilist. He preached twenty homilies, and dictated twenty more, because, through illness and loss of voice, he was unable to preach them personally. He urged bishops very strongly to preach; and, after holding up to them the example of the Apostles, he threatened the bishops of Sardinia. An edict was issued by King Guntram stating that the assistance of the public judges was to be used to bring to the hearing of the word of God, through fear of punishment, those who were not disposed to come through piety. The Synod of Trullo laid down that bishops should preach on all days, especially on Sundays; and, by the same synod, bishops who preached outside their own diocese were reduced to the status of priests, because being desirous of another's harvest they were indifferent to their own – "ut qui alienæ messis appetentes essent, suæ incuriosi". At the Council of Arles (813), bishops were strongly exhorted to preach; and the Council of Mainz, in the same year, laid down that bishops should preach on Sundays and feast days either themselves (suo marte) or though their vicars. In the Second Council of Reims (813), can. xiv, xv, it was enjoined that bishops should preach the homilies and sermons of the Fathers, so that all could understand. And in the Third Council of Tours (can. xvii), in the same year, bishops were ordered to make a translation of the homilies of the Fathers into the rustic Roman tongue, or theodesque—the rustic Roman tongue being a species of corrupt Latin, or patois, understood by the uneducated (Thomassin, "De Benef.", II, l. III, c. lxxxv, p. 510). Charlemagne and Louis the Pious were equally insistent on the necessity of preaching. The former went so far as to appoint a special day, and any bishop who failed to preach in his cathedral before that day was to be deposed. Pastors, too, were ordered to preach to their people as best they could; if they knew the Scriptures, they were to preach them; if not, they were at least to exhort their hearers to avoid evil and do good (Sixth Council of Arles, 813, can. x).

== Middle Ages ==
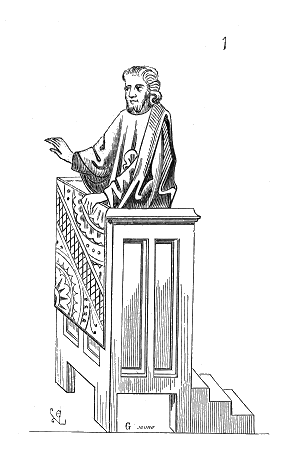
Preaching from a medieval pulpit

According to the Catholic Encyclopedia:

It has been commonly said by non-Catholic writers that there was little or no preaching during that time. So popular was preaching, and so deep the interest taken in it, that preachers commonly found it necessary to travel by night, lest their departure should be prevented. It is only in a treatise on the history of preaching that justice could be done this period. The reader is referred to Digby's "Mores Catholici", vol. II, pp. 158-172, and to Neale, "Mediæval Sermons". As to style, it was simple and majestic, possessing little, perhaps, of so-called eloquence as at present understood, but much religious power, with an artless simplicity, a sweetness and persuasiveness all its own, and such as would compare favourably with the hollow declamation of a much-lauded later period. Some sermons were wholly in verse, and, in their intense inclusiveness of thought, remind one of the Sermon on the Mount: —

Magna promisimus; majora promissa sunt nobis:
Servemus hæc; adspiremus ad illa.
Voluptas brevis; pœna perpetua.
Modica passio; gloria infinita.
Multorum vocatio; paucorum electio;
Omnium retributio

(St. Francis, as quoted by Digby, op. cit., 159.)

— Patrick A. Beecher, Homiletics, Catholic Encyclopedia 1913

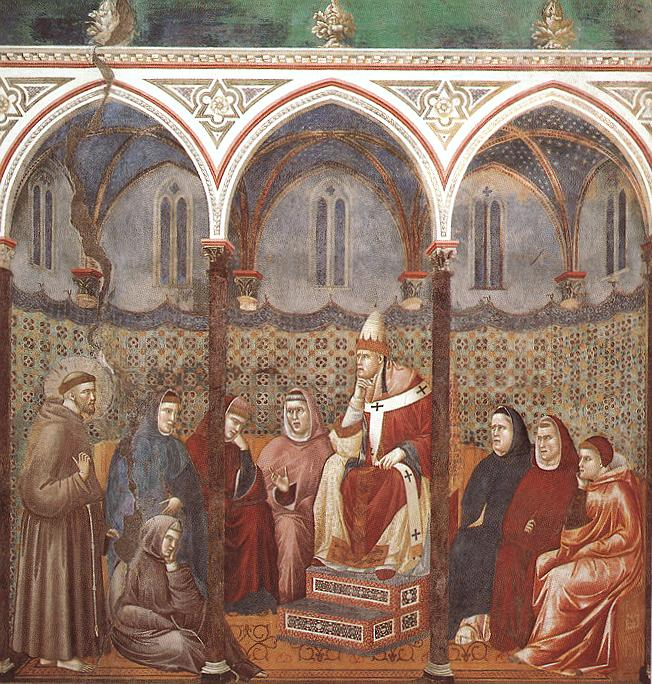
Francis of Assisi Preaching before Honorius III

The preaching of the time was characterized by:

- heavy use of Biblical quotation, integrated throughout, sometimes with a mystical interpretation shaped by Eastern influences
- power on the part of the preachers of adapting their discourses to the wants of the poor and ignorant
- simplicity, the aim being to impress a single striking idea
- use of familiar maxims, examples, and illustrations from life—their minds must have been much in touch with nature.
- intense realization, which necessarily resulted in a certain dramatic effect—they saw with their eyes, heard with their ears, and the past became present

Scholastic philosophy supplied an almost inexhaustible store of information; it trained the mind in analysis and precision; while, at the same time, it supplied a lucidity of order and cogency of arrangement such as we look for in vain in even the great orations of Chrysostom.

Philosophy regards man only as an intellectual being, without considering his emotions, and makes its appeal solely to his intellectual side. And, even in this appeal, philosophy, while, like algebra, speaking the formal language of intellect, is likely to be wanting from the view-point of persuasiveness, inasmuch as, from its nature, it makes for condensation rather than for amplification. The latter is the most important thing in oratory – "Summa laus eloquentiæ amplificare rem ornando." Fénelon (Second Dialogue) describes it as portrayal; De Quincey, as a holding of the thought until the mind gets time to eddy about it; Newman gives an analysis of it; his own sermons are remarkable for this quality of amplification as are those of Bourdaloue on the intellectual, and those of Massillon on the intellectual-emotional side, v. g. the latter's sermon on the Prodigal Son. Philosophy, indeed, is necessary for oratory; philosophy alone does not constitute oratory, and, if too one-sided, may have an injurious effect – "Logic, therefore, so much as is useful, is to be referred to this one place with all her well-couched heads and topics, until it be time to open her contracted palm into a graceful and ornate rhetoric". What has been here stated refers to philosophy as a system, not to individual philosophers. It is scarcely necessary to say that many Scholastics, such as Thomas and Bonaventure, were noted preachers.

== Renaissance ==
The next noted period in the history of preaching is the Renaissance, with the rise of humanism. The motto of two representative humanists, Reuchlin and Erasmus, was: "Back to Cicero and Quintilian." Erasmus on visiting Rome exclaimed: "Quam mellitas eruditorum hominum confabulationes, quot mundi lumina." Pierre Batiffol says: "One Good Friday, preaching before the pope, the most famous orator of the Roman Court considered that he could not better praise the Sacrifice of Calvary than by relating the self-devotion of Decius and the sacrifice of Iphigenia."

This period ended shortly thereafter, dying out in the Reformation and post-Reformation period. The Council of Trent recommended preachers to turn aside from polemics; it also pronounced that the primary duty of preaching devolved on bishops, unless they were hindered by a legitimate impediment; and ordered that they were to preach in person in their own church, or, if impeded, through others; and, in other churches, through pastors or other representatives.

== Early Modernity ==
In the eighteenth century, the Austrian Jesuit Ignaz Wurz was often considered the standard author; he taught at the University of Vienna and his Anleitung zur geistlichen Beredsamkeit (Ministers' manual for eloquence) was published in several editions beginning in 1770.

=== Notable French preachers ===
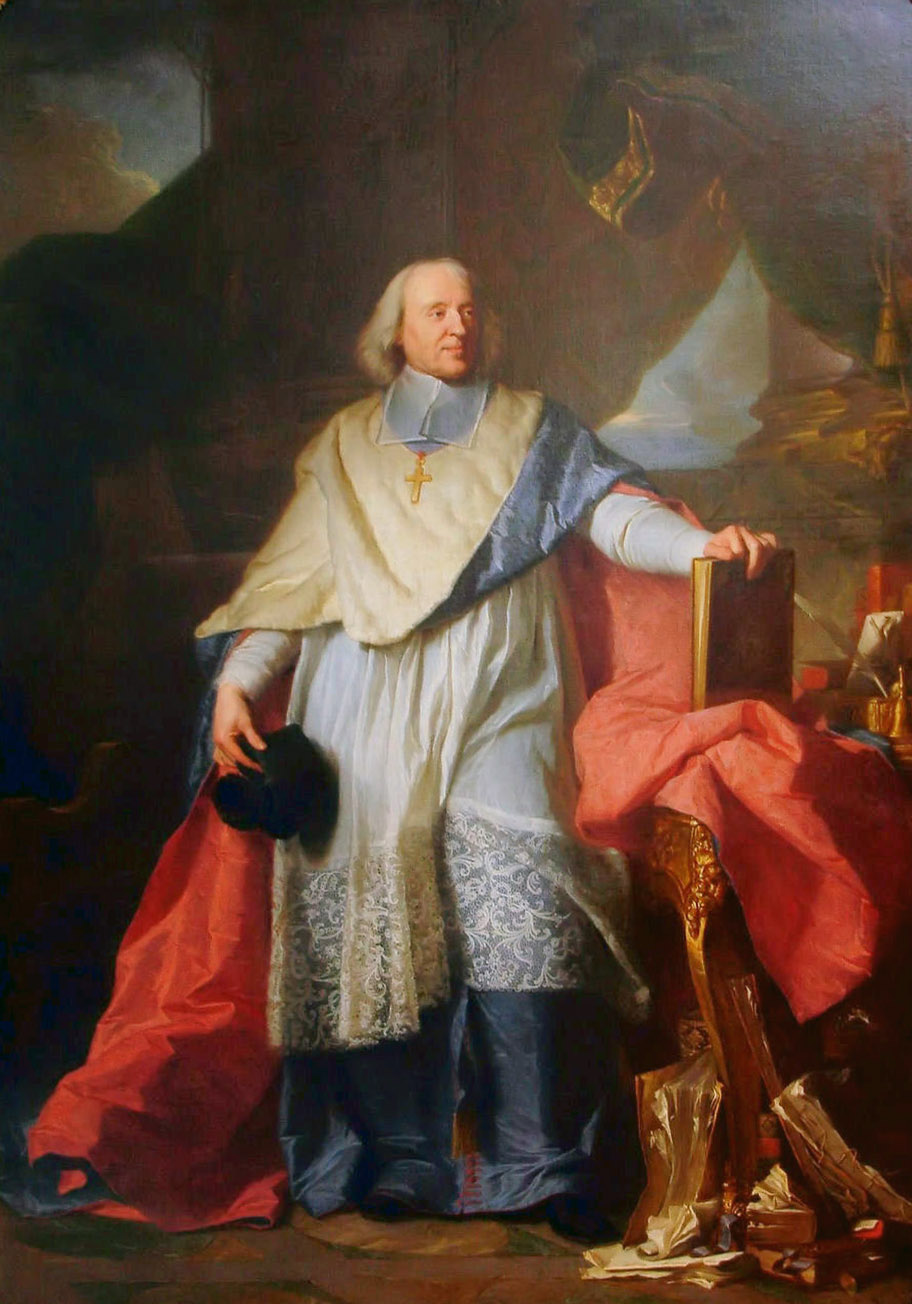
Jacques-Bénigne Bossuet

The French preachers of the classical seventeenth-century period were, according to Voltaire, probably the greatest in pulpit oratory of all time. The best known were Bossuet, Bourdaloue, and Massillon; Fénelon burnt his sermons. The first was considered to be the most majestic; the second, the most logical and intellectually compelling; the third, the greatest searcher of hearts, the most like Chrysostom, and, taken all in all, the greatest of the three. We are told that Voltaire kept a copy of his Grand Carême on his table, side by side with the "Athalie" of Racine. In this age Chrysostom was the great model for imitation; but it was Chrysostom the orator, not Chrysostom the homilist. Their style, with its grand exordium and its sublime peroration, became the fashion in the following age. The "Dialogues" of Fénelon, however, remained as a check. Of these "Dialogues" Bishop Dupanloup said: "If the precepts of Fénelon had been well understood, they would have long since fixed the character of sacred eloquence among us." Other principles were laid down by Blaise Gisbert in his L'Eloquence chrétienne dans l'idée et dans la pratique, by Amadeus Bajocensis in Paulus Ecclesiastes, seu Eloquentia Christiana, and by Guido ab Angelis in De Verbi Dei Prædicatione, all of which sounded a return to the simplicity of style of the Church Fathers.

=== Conférences in Notre-Dame ===
The next important era is the so-called conférences in Notre-Dame in Paris, following the Revolution of 1830. The most prominent name identified with this new style of preaching was that of the Dominican Lacordaire, who, for a time, with Montalembert, was associate editor with de Lamennais of "L'Avenir". This new style of preaching discarded the form, the division, and analysis of the scholastic method. The power of Lacordaire as an orator was beyond question; but the conférences, as they have come down to us, while possessing much merit, are an additional proof that oratory is too elusive to be committed to the pages of a book. The Jesuit Gustave Delacroix de Ravignan shared with Lacordaire the pulpit of Notre-Dame. Less eloquent men followed, and the semi-religious, semi-philosophic style was beginning to grow tiresome, when Jacques-Marie-Louis Monsabré, a disciple of Lacordaire, set it aside, and confined himself to an explanation of the Creed; whereupon it was sententiously remarked that the bell had been ringing long enough, it was time for Mass to begin (cf. Boyle, "Irish Eccl. Rec.", May, 1909).

== Present day ==
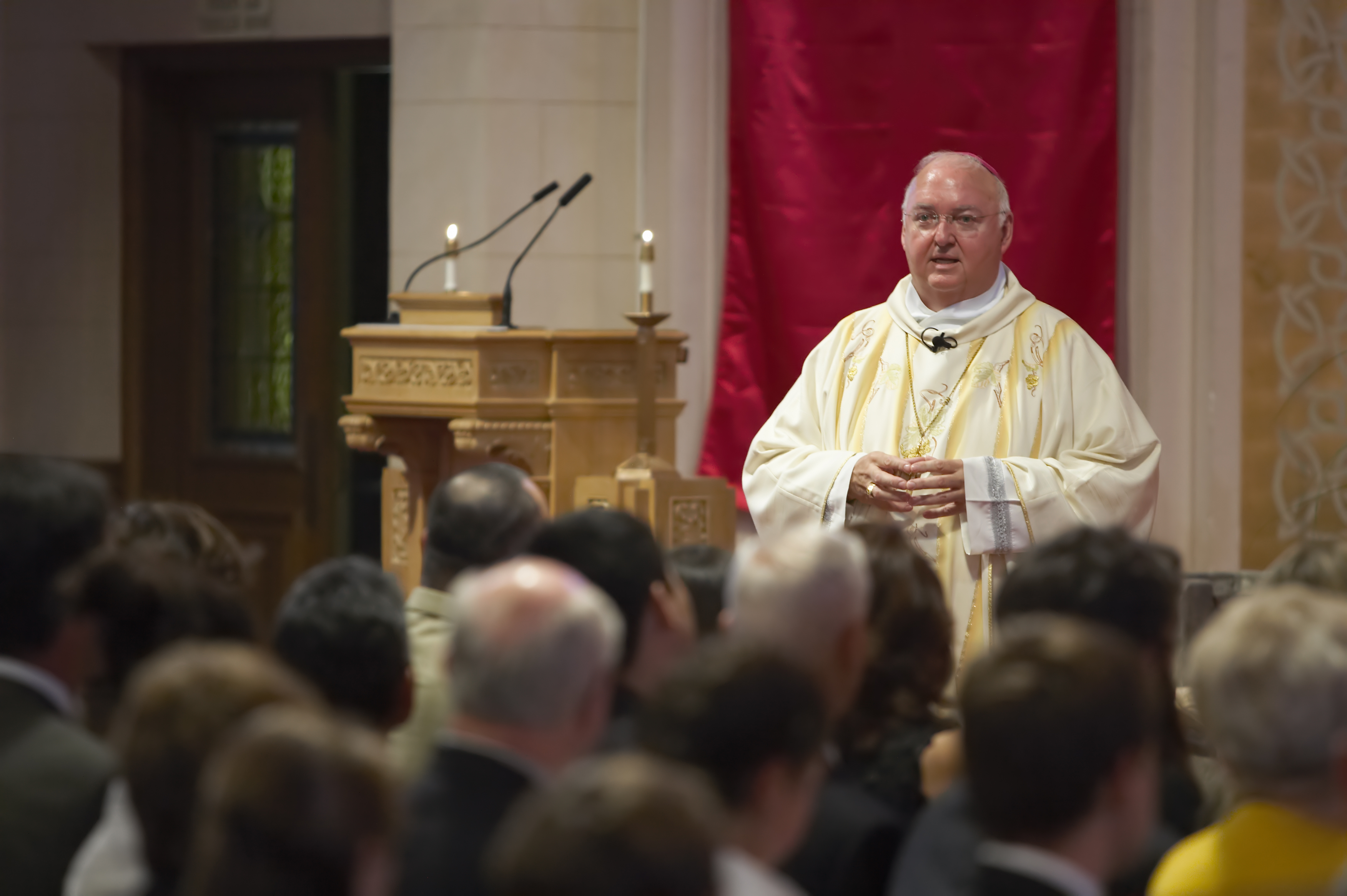
Bishop Patrick McGrath giving a homily in Palo Alto, California

As to preaching in the present day, we can clearly trace the influence, in many respects, of Scholasticism, both as to matter and form. As to matter, a sermon may be either moral, dogmatic, historical, or liturgical—by moral and dogmatic it is meant that one element will predominate, without excluding the other.

As to form, a discourse may be either formal, homily; or catechetical instruction. In a formal sermon, the influence of Scholasticism is most strikingly seen in the analytic method, resulting in divisions and subdivisions. This is the thirteenth-century method, which had its beginnings in the sermons of Bernard and Anthony. The underlying syllogism, too, in every well thought-out sermon is due to Scholasticism; how far it should appear is a question that belongs to a treatise on homiletics. As to the catechetical discourse, it has been so much favoured by Pius X that it might be regarded as one of the characteristics of preaching at the present day. It is, however, a very old form of preaching. It was used by Christ Himself, by St. Paul, by Cyril of Jerusalem, by Clement and Origen at Alexandria, by Augustine, who wrote a special treatise thereon (De catechizandis rudibus), also, in later times, by Gerson, chancellor of the University of Paris, who wrote "De parvulis ad Christum trahendis"; Clement XI and Benedict XIV gave to it all the weight of their authority, and one of the greatest of all catechists was Charles Borromeo. There is the danger, however, from the very nature of the subject, of this form of preaching becoming too dry and purely didactic, a mere catechesis, or doctrinism, to the exclusion of the moral element and of Sacred Scripture.

In recent days, organized missionary preaching to non-Catholics has received a new stimulus. In the United States, particularly, this form of religious activity has flourished; and the Paulists, amongst whom the name of Isaac Hecker is deserving of special mention, are to be mainly identified with the revival. Special facilities are afforded at the central institute of the organization for the training of those who are to impart catechetical instruction, and the non-controversial principles of the association are calculated to commend it to all earnestly seeking after religion.

=== Homiletic Directory ===
In the Roman Catholic Church, the Holy See, through the Congregation for Divine Worship and the Discipline of the Sacraments (headed as of February 2015 by Robert Sarah), has published an official guide and directory for use by bishops, priests, and deacons, who are charged with the ministry of preaching by virtue of their ordination, and for those studying the subject, among others seminarians and those in diaconal formation, called the Homiletic Directory. The Directory was developed in response to a request made by participants in the Synod of Bishops held in 2008 on the Word of God, and in accordance with the instructions of Pope Benedict XVI.

== Bibliography of historical development ==
=== John Chrysostom and Augustine ===
Practice preceded theory. Certain ideas are to be found in the Church Fathers, and these have been collected by Paniel in the introduction to his work "Geschichte der christlich. Beredsamkeit". The first to treat of the theory of preaching was John Chrysostom, in his work "On the Priesthood" (peri Hierosynes). Inasmuch as this contains only reflections on preaching, Augustine's De doctrina christiana (DDC) might be regarded as the first manual on the subject; its first three books deal with collecting the materials for preaching, "modus inveniendi quæ intelligenda sunt", and the last with the presentation thereof, "modus proferendi quæ intellecta sunt". He goes to Cicero for rules in the latter. He makes a distinction, in which he evidently follows Cicero, between sapientia (wisdom) and eloquentia (the best expression of it). Sapientia without eloquentia will do no good; neither will eloquentia without sapientia, and it may do harm; the ideal is sapientia with eloquentia. He adapts Cicero's ut doceat, ut delectet, ut flectat, changing them to ut veritas pateat, ut placeat, ut moveat; and lays down these as the rules by which a sermon is to be judged. This work of Augustine was the classic one in homiletics.

Augustine explains his homiletics in Book IV of DDC. He describes it practically in relation to the classical theory of oratory, which has five parts: inventio (the choice of the subject and decision of the order), dispositio (the structure of the oration), elocutio (the arrangement of words and figure of speech), memoria (learning by heart), and pronuntiatio (the delivery). He constructed this theory in four parts: the basic principles of rhetoric (DDC 4.1.1-4.56.10), a study on the rhetoric of Scriptural texts (DDC 4.7.11-4.11.26), an analysis of styles (DDC 4.12.27-4.21.50), and some peculiar rules of rhetoric for sermons (DDC 4.22.51-4.31.64). The essential part of Book IV deals with three styles of sermons (genera tenue / docere [to teach]; genera medium / delectare [to amuse]; genera grande / flectere [to persuade]), which was influenced by Cicero’s Orator 1.3.

Augustine stresses the importance of principle and discipline at the same time. Preachers need to practice again and again (DDC 4.3.4) so that they can use these styles in any situation of preaching (DDC 4.19.38). But they should pay attention to the priority of order. Continuous and diligent study of the Bible is more important than mere memorization, that is to say, they should pursue wisdom more than knowledge (DDC 4.5.7). The best is the combination of wisdom and eloquence as seen in the Pauline letters and prophetic writings (DDC 4.6.9-4.7.21). Yet, he does not praise eloquence itself; rather he prefers a concrete proclamation than a showing off of rhetorical technique (DDC 4.7.14-15). It is truth, not rhetoric, that preachers try to deliver (DDC 4.28.61).

The most significant practice and discipline is prayer. Augustine advises to be a prayer before being a preacher. Preachers should pray before and after his sermon (DDC 3.37.56; 4.15.32; 4.17.34; 4.30.63). Augustine himself was a good model of this practice. Before the preaching, he invited the congregation to pray (Epistula 29). After the sermon he also prayed (Sermones 153.1). For Augustine’s homiletics, the time of prayer is the most precious time, because that time is a time when all the audience meets God the Truth, and through that time they can understand the truth of God more fully. Prayer is a major means of grace in knowing God. Augustine says that love is the most important discipline in Christian life in his sermon, De disciplina christiana. If one adds another to Christian discipline besides love, prayer will come first.

The preacher should be a good example of all sermons. The manner of life can be an eloquent sermon (copia dicendi, forma vivendi; DDC 4.29.61). In most of the cases, it seems to be true that the sermon of a preacher cannot be better than his or her life, but vice versa seems also to be true: the sermon cannot be worse than the preacher’s life. The more a preacher endeavors after humility, discipline, and love, the better his or her sermon becomes. And now these three are always necessary for all Christian teachers: humility, discipline, and love. But the greatest of these is love. For "the goal of this command is love" (1 Tim. 1:5 cited in DDC 1.26.27; 1.35.39; 1.40.44; 4.28.61).

Hugh of St. Victor (died 1141) in the Middle Ages laid down three conditions for a sermon: that it should be "holy, prudent and noble", for which, respectively, he required sanctity, knowledge and eloquence in the preacher. François Fénelon stipulated "must prove, must portray, must impress" (Second Dialogue).

Augustine's work "De rudibus catechizandis" is also relevant. Gregory the Great's "Liber regulæ pastoralis" is still extant, but is inferior to Augustine's; it is rather a treatise on pastoral theology than on homiletics.

Hincmar says that a copy used to be given to bishops at their consecration.

In the ninth century Rabanus Maurus (died 856), Archbishop of Mainz, wrote a treatise De institutione clericorum, in which he depends much on Augustine.

In the twelfth century Guibert, Abbot of Nogent (died 1124), wrote a famous work on preaching entitled "Quo ordine sermo fieri debet". This is one of the historical landmarks in preaching. It is replete with judicious instruction; it recommends that preaching should be preceded by prayer; it says that it is more important to preach about morals than on faith, that for moral sermons the human heart must be studied, and that the best way of doing so is (as Massillon recommended in later times) to look into one's own. It is more original and more independent than the work of Rabanus Maurus, who, as has been said, drew largely from Augustine.

Guibert's work was recommended by Pope Alexander as a model to all preachers. Francis of Assisi gave to his friars the same directions as are herein contained.

=== Alain de Lille ===
To the same period belongs the "Summa de arte prædicatoriâ" by Alain de Lille, which defines preaching: "Manifesta et publica instructio morum et fidei, informationi hominum deserviens, ex rationum semitâ et auctoritatum fonte proveniens". He lays stress on explanation and use of Scripture and recommends the preacher to insert verba commotiva. The remarks of Cæsarius of Heisterbach (died 1240) have been collected by Cruel; his sermons display skill in construction and considerable oratorical power. Conrad of Brundelsheim (died 1321), whose sermons have come down to us under his cognomen of "Brother Sock" (Sermones Fratris Socci), was one of the most interesting preachers at this time in Germany. Humbert of Romans, General superior of the Dominicans, in the second book of his work, "De eruditione prædicatorum", claims that he can teach "a way of promptly producing a sermon for any set of men, and for all variety of circumstances". Linsenmayer, in his history of preaching, gives information about Humbert, who was a severe critic of the sermons of his time. Trithemius quotes a work by Albertus Magnus, "De arte prædicandi", which is lost. Bonaventure wrote "De arte concionandi", in which he treats of divisio, distinctio, dilatatio, but deals extensively only with the first.

=== Thomas Aquinas ===
Thomas Aquinas's claim rests chiefly on the "Summa", which, of course, has principally influenced preaching since, both in matter and form. He insists very strongly on the importance of preaching, and says that it belongs principally to bishops, and baptizing to priests, the latter of whom he regards as holding the place of the seventy disciples. There is a treatise entitled De arte et vero modo prædicandi attributed to him, but it is simply a compilation of his ideas about preaching that was made by another. Henry of Hesse is credited with a treatise, "De arte prædicandi", which is probably not due to him. There is a monograph quoted by Hartwig which is interesting for the classification of the forms of sermon: modus antiquissimus, i. e. postillatio, which is purely the exegetic homily; modus modernus, the thematic style; modus antiquus, a sermon on the Biblical text; and modus subalternus, a mixture of homiletic and text sermon. Jerome Dungersheym wrote a tract De modo discendi et docendi ad populum sacra seu de modo prædicandi (1513). He treats of his subject on three points: the preacher, the sermon, the listeners. He lays stress on Scripture as the book of the preacher. Ulrich Surgant wrote a "Manuale Curatorum" (1508), in which he also recommends Scripture. His first book gives for material of preaching the usual order credenda, facienda, fugienda, timenda, appetenda and ends by saying: "Congrua materia prædicationis est Sacra Scriptura." He uses the figure of a tree in laying stress on the necessity of an organic structure.

=== Humanist writings ===
In the works of the two humanists, Johannes Reuchlin (Liber congestorum de arte prædicandi) and Desiderius Erasmus (Ecclesiastes seu de ratione concionandi), the return is marked to Cicero and Quintilian. A masterwork on the art of preaching is the "Rhetorica Sacra" (Lisbon, 1576) of Luis de Granada, for modern use rather old. The work shows an easy grasp of rhetoric, founded on the principles of Aristotle, Demetrius and Cicero. He treats the usual subjects of invention, arrangement, style and delivery in easy and polished Latin. Of the same class is Didacus Stella in his "Liberdemodo concionandi" (1576). Valerio, in Italy, also wrote on the art of preaching. Another landmark on preaching are the "Instructiones Pastorum" by Charles Borromeo (1538–84). At his request Valerio, Bishop of Verona, wrote a systematic treatise on homiletics entitled "Rhetorica Ecclesiastica" (1575), in which he points out the difference between profane and sacred eloquence and emphasizes the two principal objects of the preacher, to teach and to move (docere et commovere).

Laurentius a Villavicentio, in his work "De formandis sacris concionibus" (1565), disapproves of transferring the ancient modes of speaking to preaching. He would treat the truths of the Gospel according to I Tim., iii, 16. He also recommended moderation in fighting heresy. The same was the view of Francis Borgia, whose contribution to homiletics is the small but practical work: "Libellus de ratione concionandi". Claudius Acquaviva, General of the Jesuits, wrote in 163, "Instructio pro superioribus". They were principally ascetic, and in them he regulated the spiritual training necessary for the preacher. Carolus Regius deals in his "Orator Christianus" (1613) with the whole field of homiletics under the grouping: "De concionatore"; "De concione"; "De concionantis prudentiâ et industriâ". Much is to be found in the writings of Vincent de Paul, Alphonsus Liguori and Francis de Sales, especially in his celebrated letter to André Fremiot, Archbishop of Bourges.

Among the Dominicans, Alexander Natalis wrote "Institutio concionantium tripartita" (Paris, 1702).

In the "Rhetorica ecclesiastica" (1627) of Jacobus de Graffiis is contained a symposium of the instructions on preaching by the Franciscan Francis Panigarola, the Jesuit Francis Borgia and the Carmelite Johannes a Jesu.

The "Dialogues" of Fénelon, the works of Blaise Gisbert, Amadeus Bajocensis and Guido ab Angelis have already been referred to. In the nineteenth century homiletics took its place as a branch of pastoral theology, and many manuals have been written thereon, for instance in German compendia by Brand, Laberenz, Zarbl, Fluck and Schüch; in Italian by Gotti and Guglielmo Audisio; and many in French and English.

== Relation to secular rhetoric ==
Some assert the independent character of homiletics and say that it is independent in origin, matter and purpose. The upholders of this view point to passages in Scripture and in the Fathers, notably to the words of Paul; and to the testimony of Cyprian, Arnobius, Lactantius, and to Gregory of Nazianzus, Augustine of Hippo, Jerome and John Chrysostom. The last-named says that the great difference may be summed up in this: that the orator seeks personal glory, the preacher practical good.

Paul's own sermons are in many cases replete with oratory, e.g., his sermon on the Areopagus; and the oratorical element generally enters largely into Scripture. Lactantius regretted that there were so few trained preachers, and Gregory, as well as Chrysostom and Augustine, made use of rhetoric in preaching. Gregory censured the use in the pulpit of the eloquence and pronunciation of the theatre. Demetrius, On Style, uses many of the tricks of speech.
