= Tückelhausen Charterhouse =

Carthusian monastery in Ochsenfurt, Bavaria

Coordinates: 49.6526°N 10.0252°E

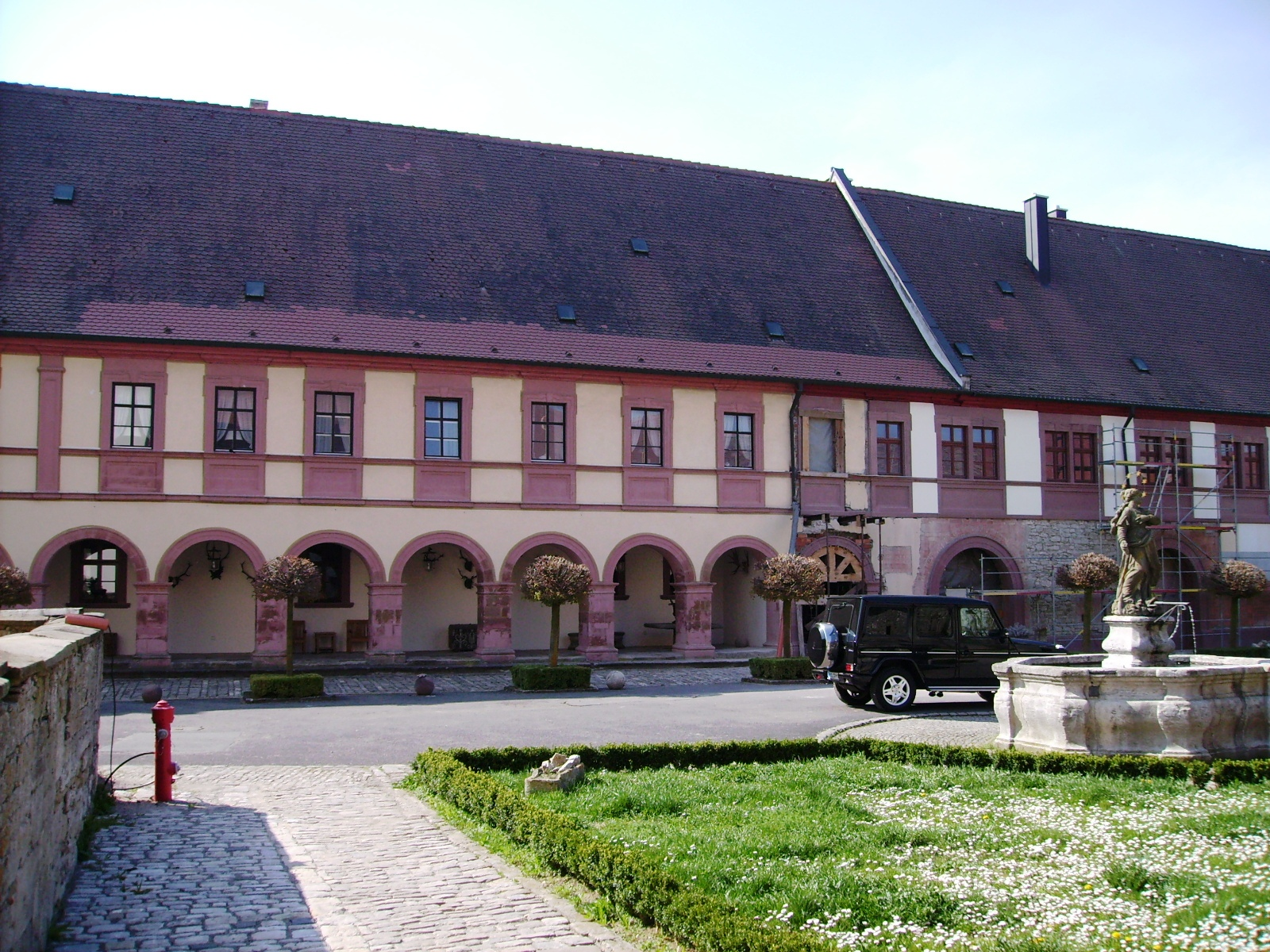
Kloster Tückelhausen

Tückelhausen Charterhouse (German: Kartause or Kloster Tückelhausen) is a former Carthusian monastery, or charterhouse, in Ochsenfurt in Bavaria, Germany.

== History ==
The monastery, dedicated to Saints Lambert, John the Baptist and George, was founded in 1138 by Otto I, Bishop of Bamberg, as a double canonry of the Premonstratensians. From 1351 it belonged to the Carthusians.

The charterhouse was dissolved in 1803 during the secularisation of Bavaria and passed mostly into private ownership. The prior's lodging became the parish priest's house, while the monks' cells were turned into cottages.

== Carthusian Museum ==
The Kloster Tückelhausen Museum displays the history of the Carthusians in Franconia and includes the reconstruction of a monk's cell. The former library contains an exhibition of contemporary artwork.
