= Ochsenfurt =

- Town
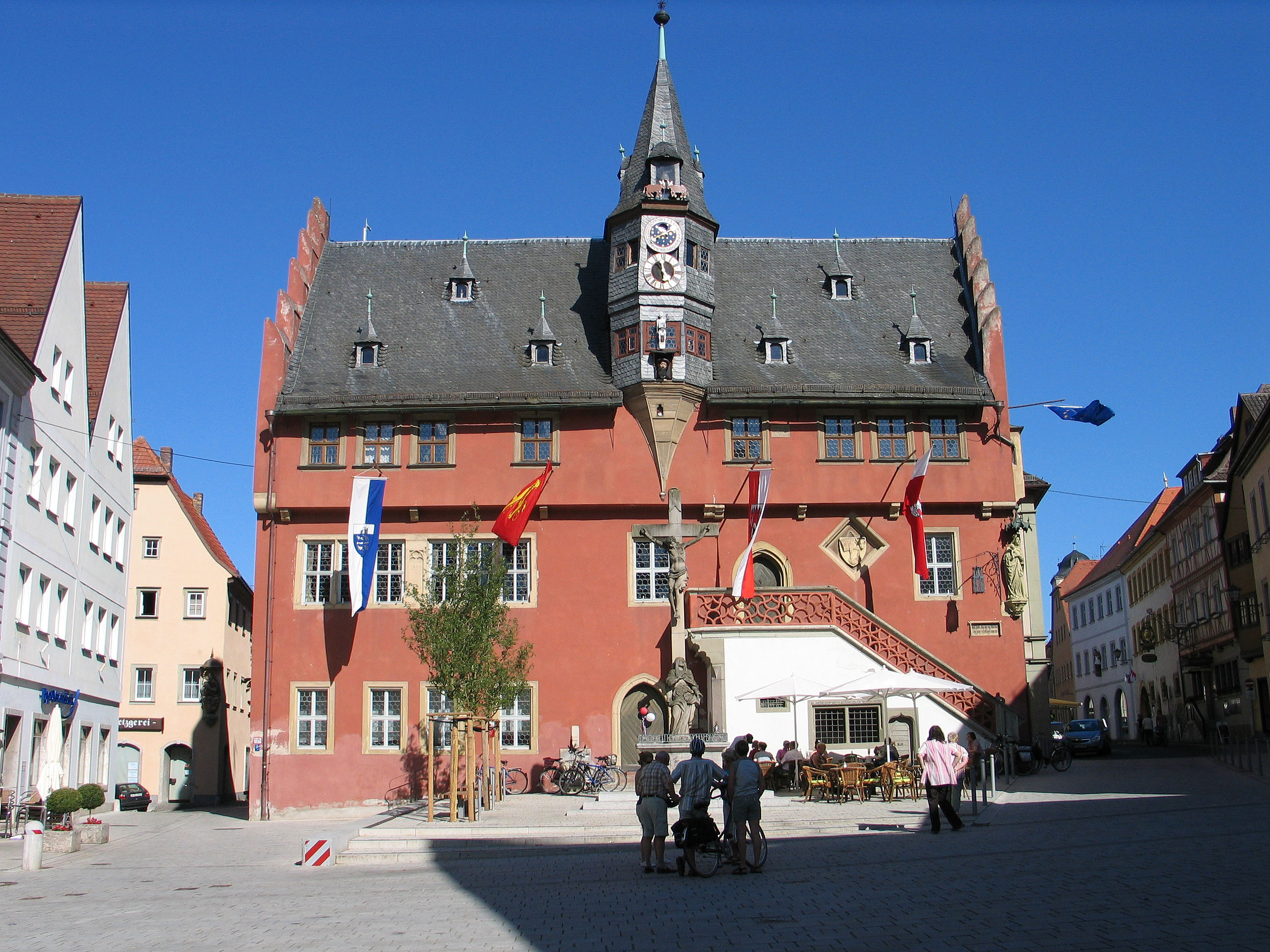
- New Townhall from 1497 in Ochsenfurt

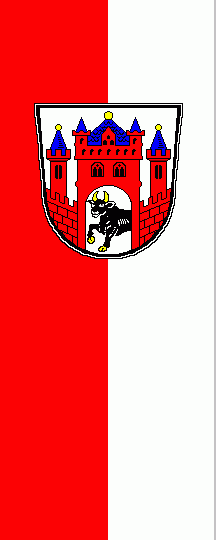
- Flag Coat of arms

- Location of Ochsenfurt within Würzburg district
- Interactive map of Ochsenfurt
- Location within Germany Location within Bavaria
- Coordinates: 49°39′N 10°04′E
- Country: Germany
- State: Bavaria
- Admin. region: Unterfranken
- District: Würzburg
- Subdivisions: 9 Stadtteile/Stadtbezirke

Government
  - Mayor (2020–26): Peter Juks

Area
  - Total: 63.57 km^{2} (24.54 sq mi)
- Elevation: 187 m (614 ft)

Population (2025-12-31)
  - Total: 11,247
  - Density: 176.9/km^{2} (458.2/sq mi)
- Time zone: UTC+01:00 (CET)
  - Summer (DST): UTC+02:00 (CEST)
- Postal codes: 97199
- Dialling codes: 09331
- Vehicle registration: WÜ, OCH
- Website: www.ochsenfurt.de

Ochsenfurt (German: [ˈɔksn̩ˌfʊʁt]) is a town in the district of Würzburg, in Bavaria, Germany. Ochsenfurt is located on the left bank of the River Main and has around 11,000 inhabitants. This makes it the largest town in Würzburg district.

== Name ==
Like Oxford, the town of Ochsenfurt is named after a ford where oxen crossed the river.

== Geography ==
=== Location ===
The town is situated on the left bank of the River Main, 21 kilometres (13 mi) south of Würzburg.

=== Subdivision ===
The Stadtteile of Ochsenfurt are: Darstadt, Erlach, Goßmannsdorf, Hohestadt, Hopferstadt, Kleinochsenfurt, Tückelhausen, and Zeubelried.

== History ==
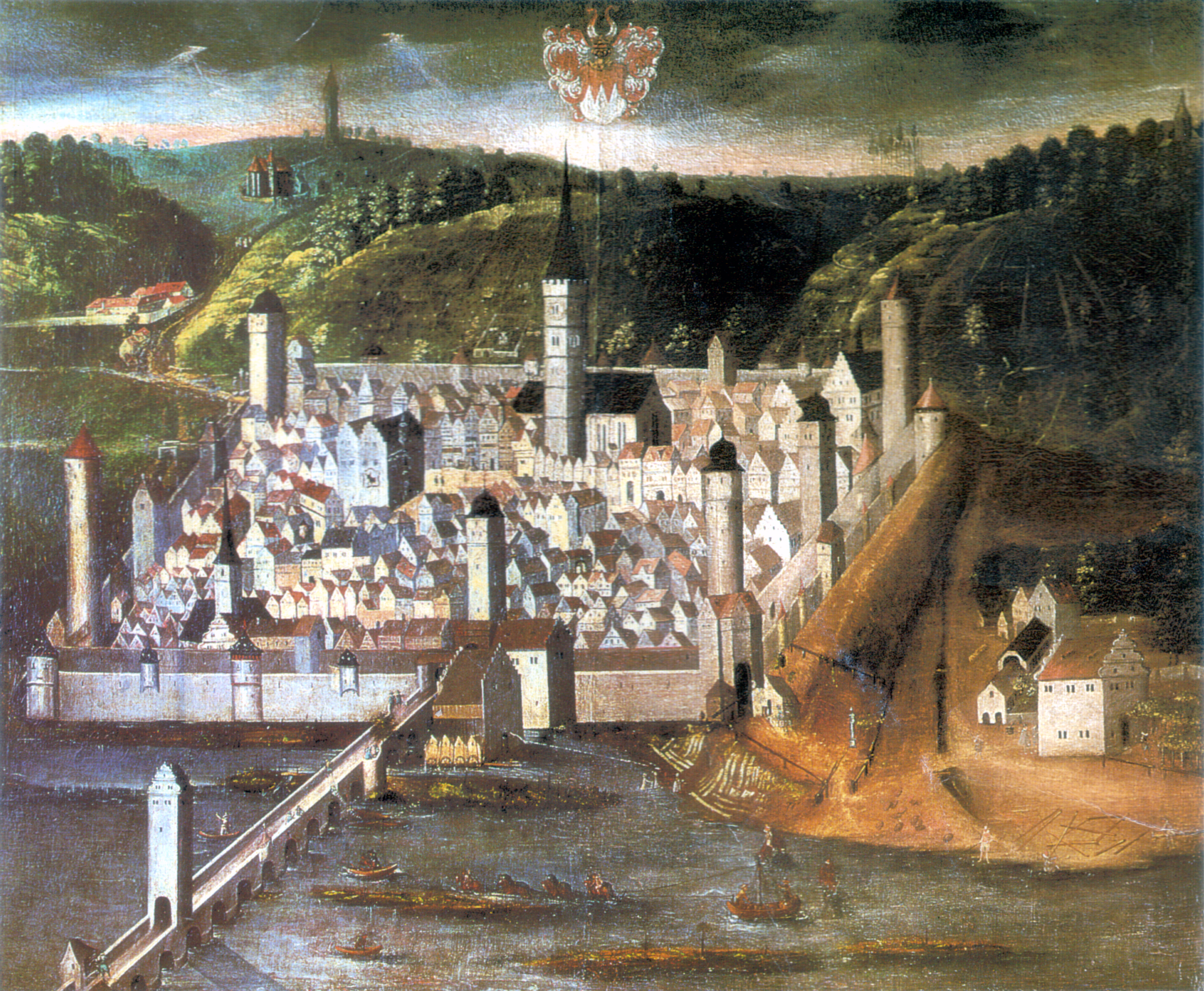
Painting of Ochsenfurt - 1623

Ochsenfurt was one of the places in Germany where King Richard I of England was detained in 1193 while on his way to England from the Third Crusade.

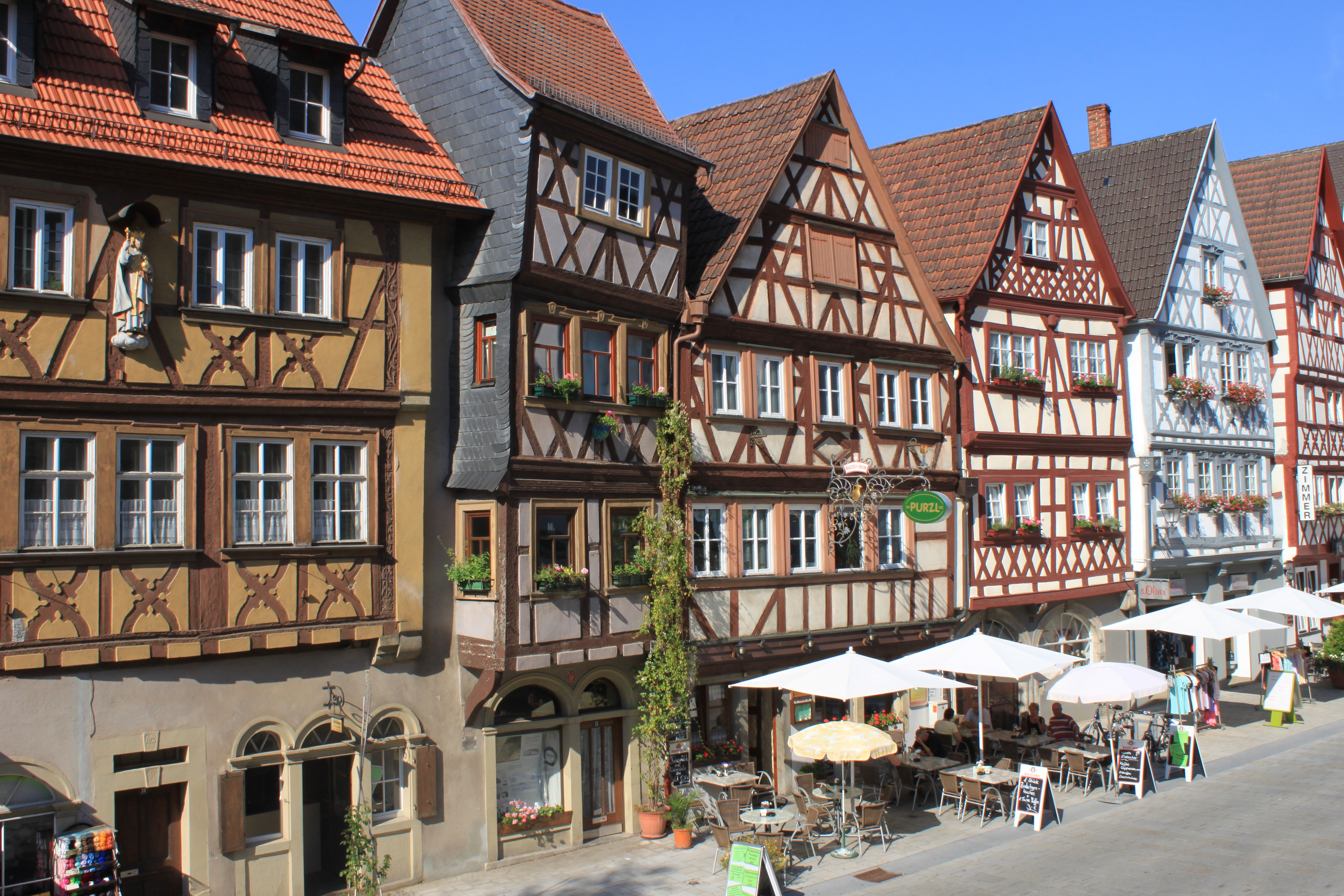
Fachwerkhauser

A monastery, Tückelhausen Charterhouse, dedicated to Saints Lambert, John the Baptist, and George, was founded in 1138 by Otto I, Bishop of Bamberg, as a double canonry of the Premonstratensians. From 1351 it belonged to the Carthusians and was secularised in 1803.

== Attractions ==
The charterhouse was largely converted for private residential use and since 1991 contains a museum of Carthusian life.

Ochsenfurt also features several Protestant and Roman Catholic churches, among them that of St Michael (Michaelskapelle), a Gothic edifice.

== Economy ==
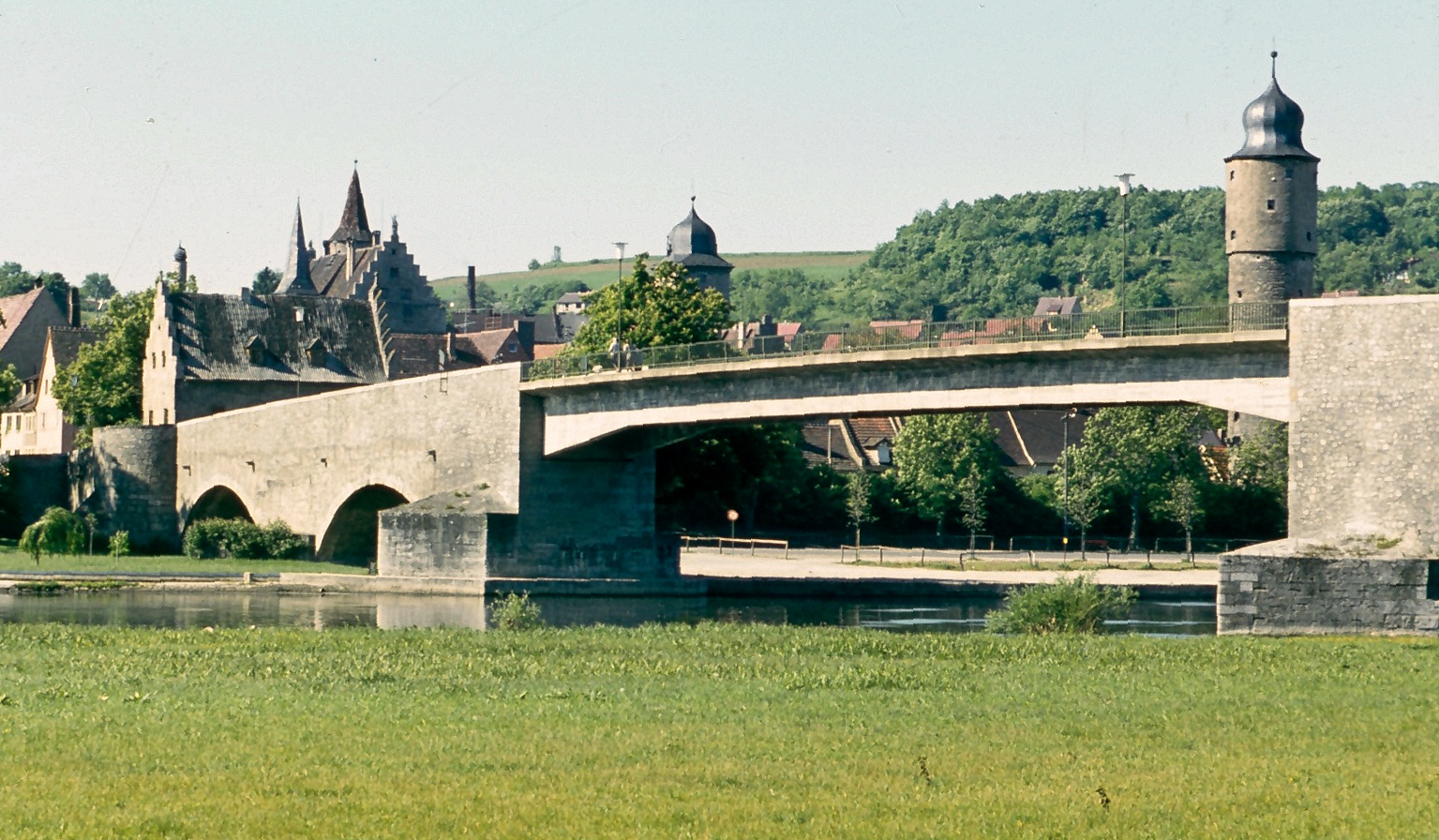
Alte Mainbrücke, after the post-WW II rebuilding

In 1911 there was a considerable trade in wine and agricultural products, other industries being brewing and malting. Ochsenfurt also has one of the largest sugar factories in Germany.

== Governance ==
=== Mayor ===
Peter Juks (UWG) is the mayor of Ochsenfurt.

=== Town twinning ===
Ochsenfurt is twinned with:

Ropczyce in Poland; Wimborne in England; Zábřeh in Czech Republic	Coutances in France; Colditz in Germany; Bibbiena in Italy

== Gallery ==
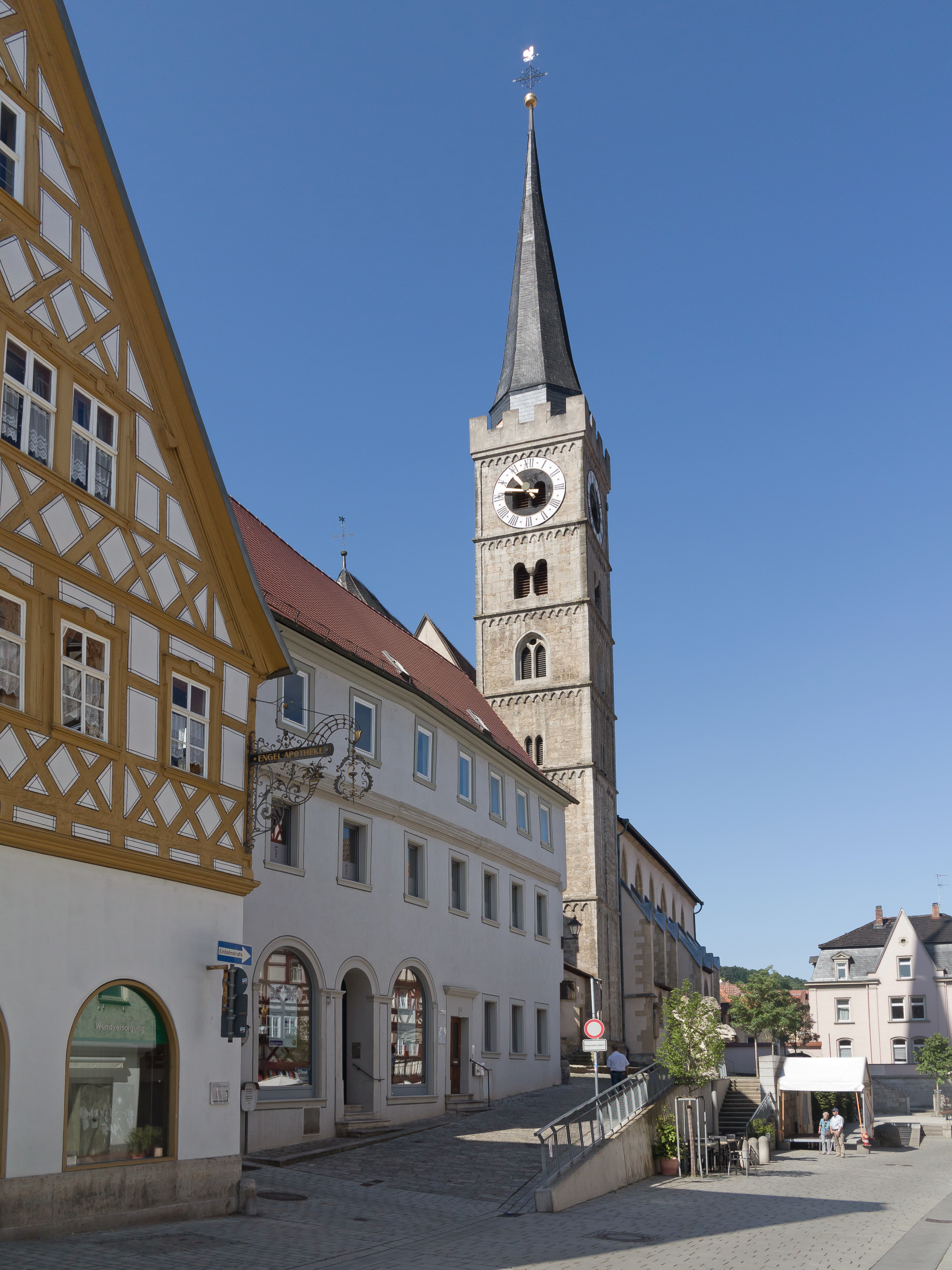
Church: Pfarrkirche Sankt Andreas

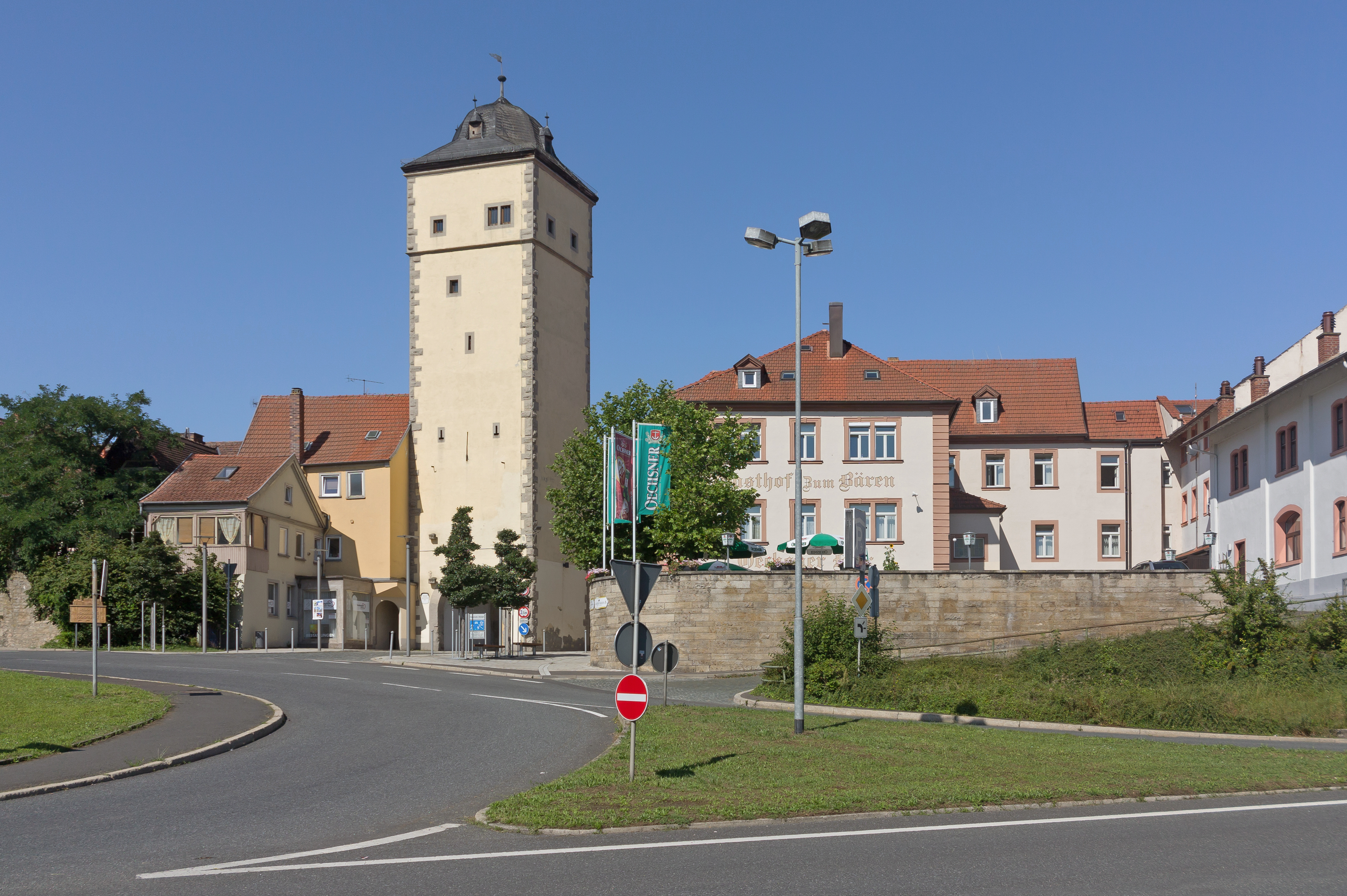
Town gate: Oberes Tor

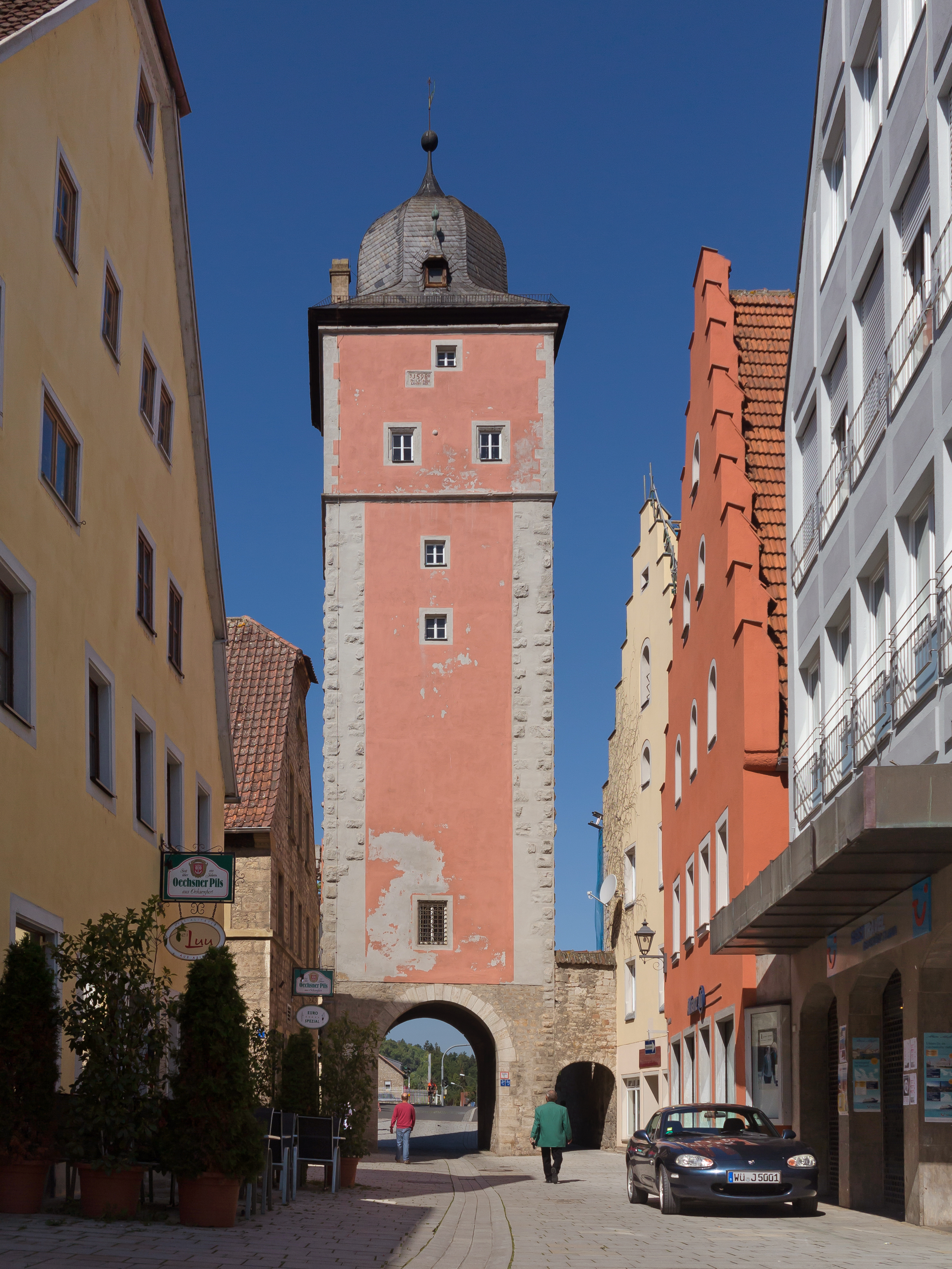
Town gate: Klingentor

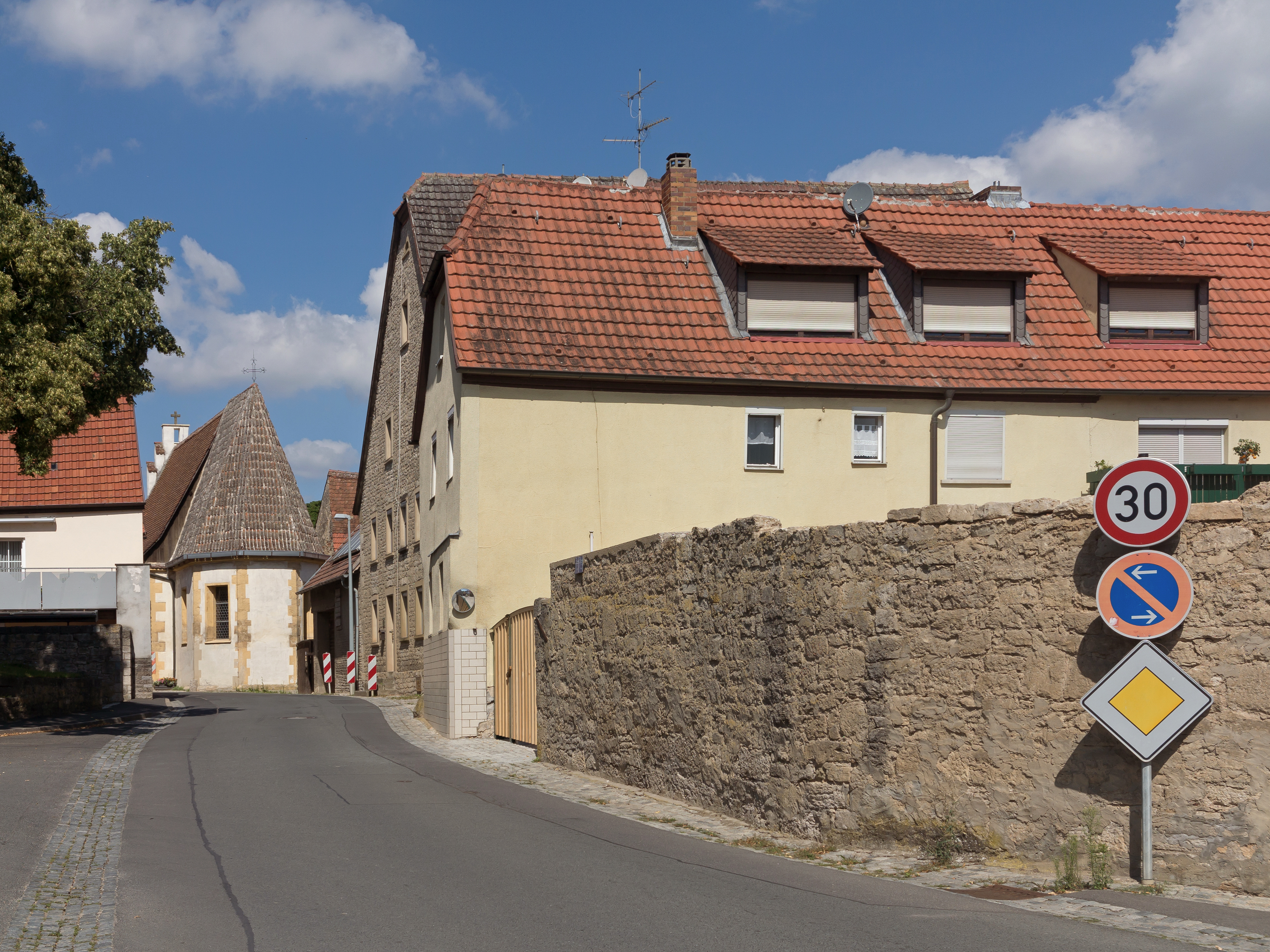
Gossmanndorf, street view: Zielweg-Zehnhofstrasse

== Notable people ==
- Hieronymus Dungersheim (1465–1540), Catholic theologian
- Tomas Oral (born 1973), football player and coach
- Maximilian Götz (born 1986), racing driver

== Bibliography ==
- Die Kunstdenkmäler von Unterfranken, Bd. 1: Bezirksamt Ochsenfurt. 2nd edition 1983. ISBN 978-3-486-50455-2
- Halbleib, Volker; Kretzer, Heinz (2006). Ochsenfurt. Sutton. ISBN 978-3-86680-000-7.

== See also ==
- List of medieval stone bridges in Germany
