= Ignaz Wurz =

Austrian Jesuit priest (1731–1784)

Ignaz Wurz (December 28, 1731 – August 28 or 29, 1784) was an Austrian Jesuit priest who taught rhetoric and published several dramas and textbooks.

== Life ==
He was born in Wiener Neustadt. He entered the Jesuit order in Vienna in 1747 at the age of 16, and soon moved to Graz to study philosophy, mathematics and theology. He taught school for several years, first at the Military Academy in Wiener Neustadt and later at Jesuit schools in Vienna. He taught both public speaking and written composition.

His sermons were popular. The sermon he preached on the coronation day of Emperor Joseph II (April 3, 1764) was subsequently printed. It brought Wurz to the attention of university administrators in Vienna and led to his appointed as professor of "sacred eloquence" at the University of Vienna's theology department. He remained in this post until in 1776, even after his order was abolished in 1773. Writing in 1850, Jakob Fluck ranked Wurz as the best teacher of homiletics in the eighteenth century.

He retired to parish work, administering the parish of Pierawart in Lower Austria until he died.

== Publications ==
- Ode auf das hohe Geburtsfest Sr. K. Hoheit des Durchl. Fürsten Joseph.
- Lobrede auf den sel. Simon de Roxas, 1767.
- Dankrede auf die glückliche Genesung Marien Theresiens, 1767.
- Lobrede auf den hl. Kilianus, 1770.
- Lobrede auf den hl. Johann v. Nepomuk, 1770.
- Lobrede auf den hl. Bonifazius, 1770.
- Anleitung zur geistlichen Beredsamkeit, 1770–1772.
- Anleitung zur geistlichen Beredsamkeit im Auszuge, 1776.
- Anleitung zur geistlichen Beredsamkeit im Auszug, 1782.
- Lob- und Gelegenheitsreden, 1785.
