= Hieronymus Dungersheim =

German theologian

Hieronymus Dungersheim or Dungersheym von Ochsenfart(1465, Ochsenfurt – 1540) was a German Catholic theologian and controversialist (skeptic). A professor of the University of Leipzig, he was an early opponent of the Lutherans there.

== Works ==
- De modo discendi et docendi ad populum sacra seu de modo prædicandi (1513)
- Schriften Gegen Luther Theorismata Duodecim Contra Lutherum, Articuli Sive Libelli Triginta, modern edition by Theobald Freudenberger (1987) ISBN 978-3-402-03453-8 / ISBN 3-402-03453-0
