= Malbergbahn =

Funicular in Bad Ems, Germany

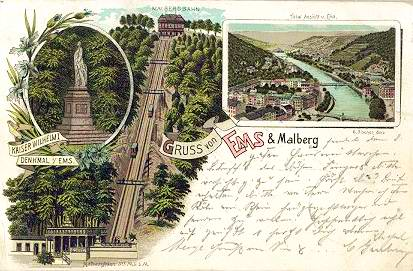
Malbergbahn in 1899

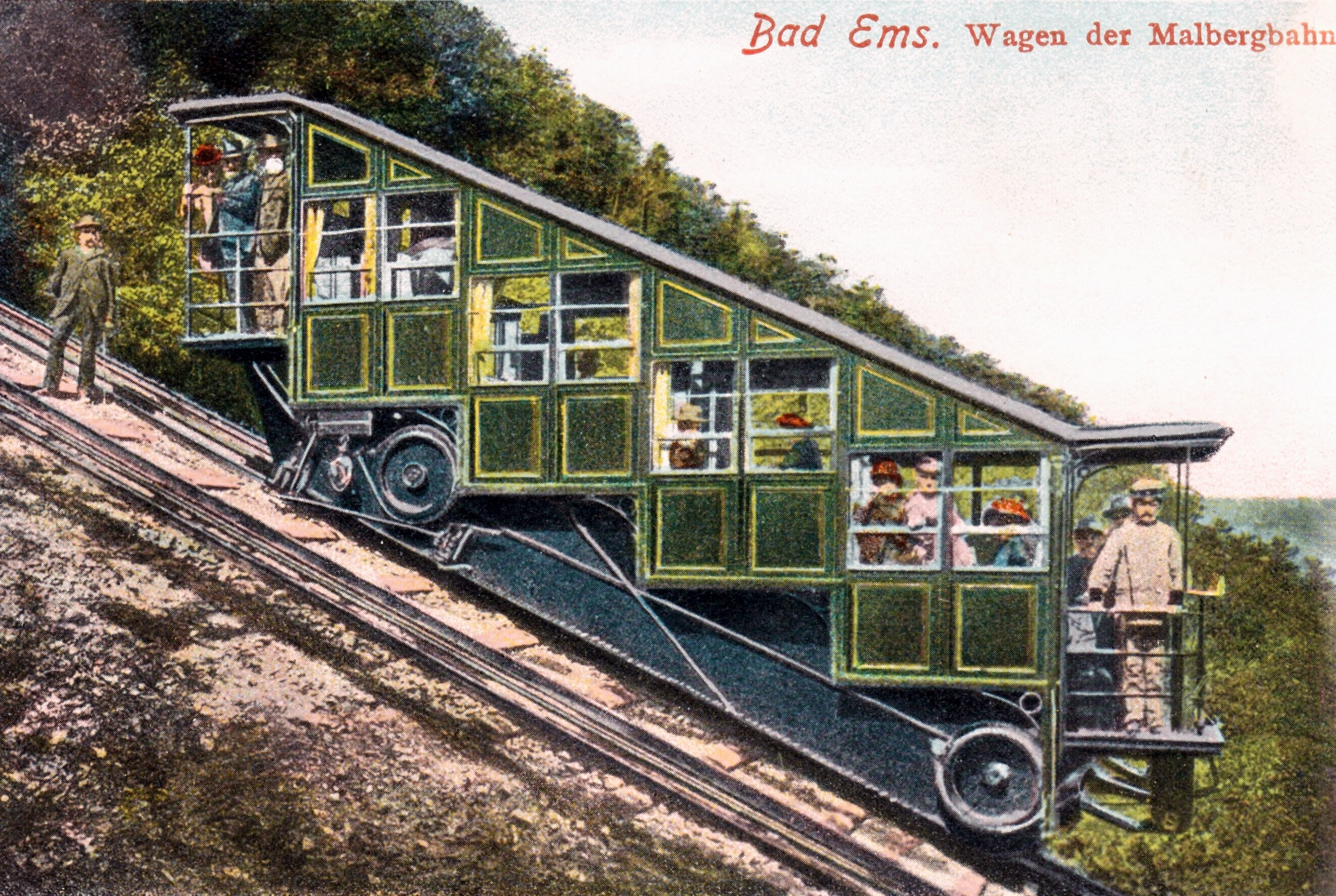
The carriage of the Malbergbahn in 1890

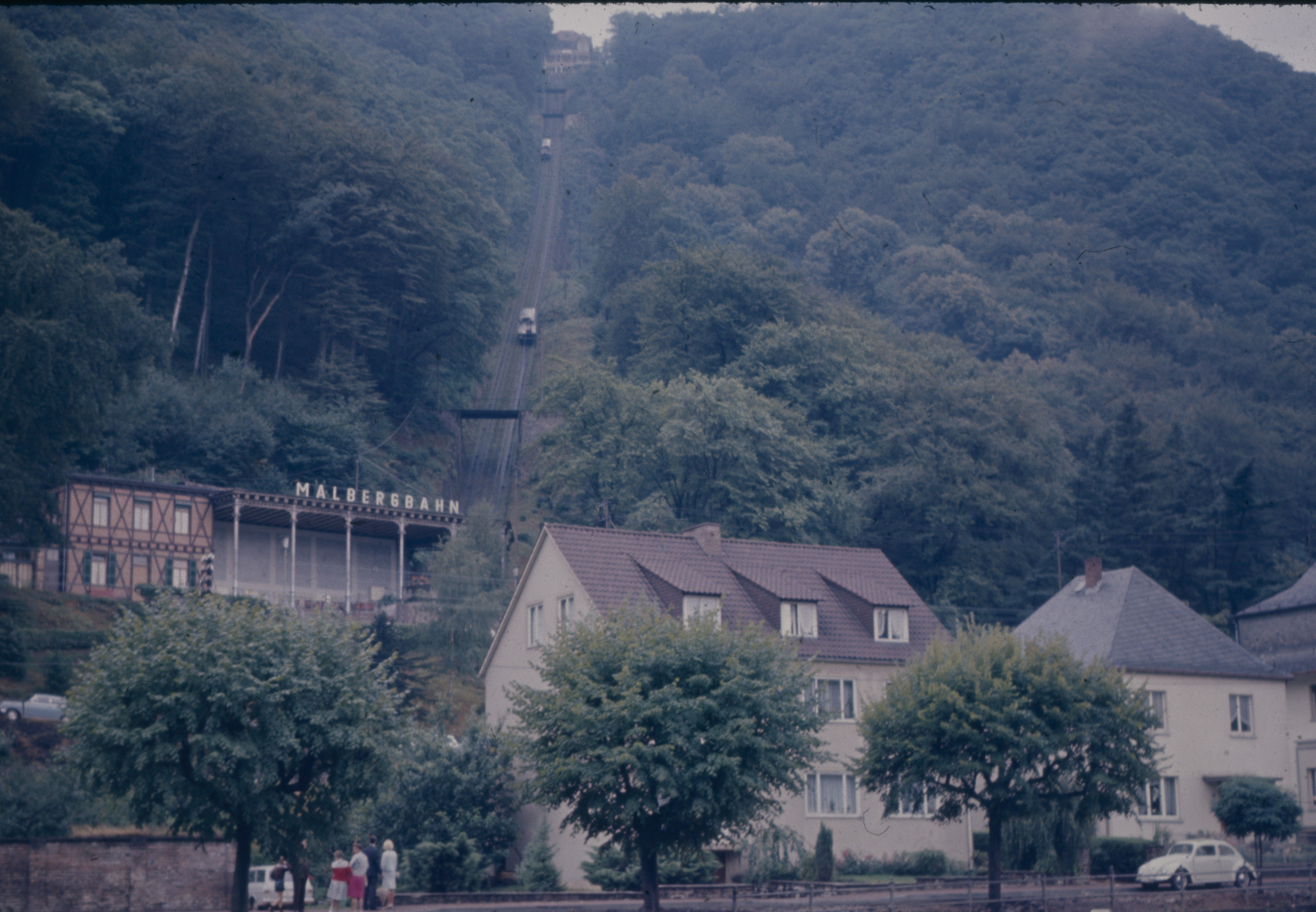
Bad Ems, Malbergbahn (1964)

The Malbergbahn - also known as Malbergbahn Bad Ems - was a funicular, that operated between Bad Ems and the hotel at the Malberg Hohen from 5 June 1887 to 1979. On 7 December 1981, two years after the decommissioning, was the funicular made into a technological monument. It had no accidents during its operational period.

In 1979, on the opposite side of the Lahn, was the Kurwaldbahn opened.

== History ==
In 1872, the city of Bad Ems decided to build a hotel on the 350-meter-high Hohen Malberg to compensate for the absence of numerous foreign spa guests. To provide access to the site, the construction of a "funicular with a water counterbalance system" (water balance railway) was decided upon, and for this purpose, the Malbergbahn AG was founded in 1885. The operating company was registered in the commercial register in Cologne on 3 December 1886 under the name MAG.

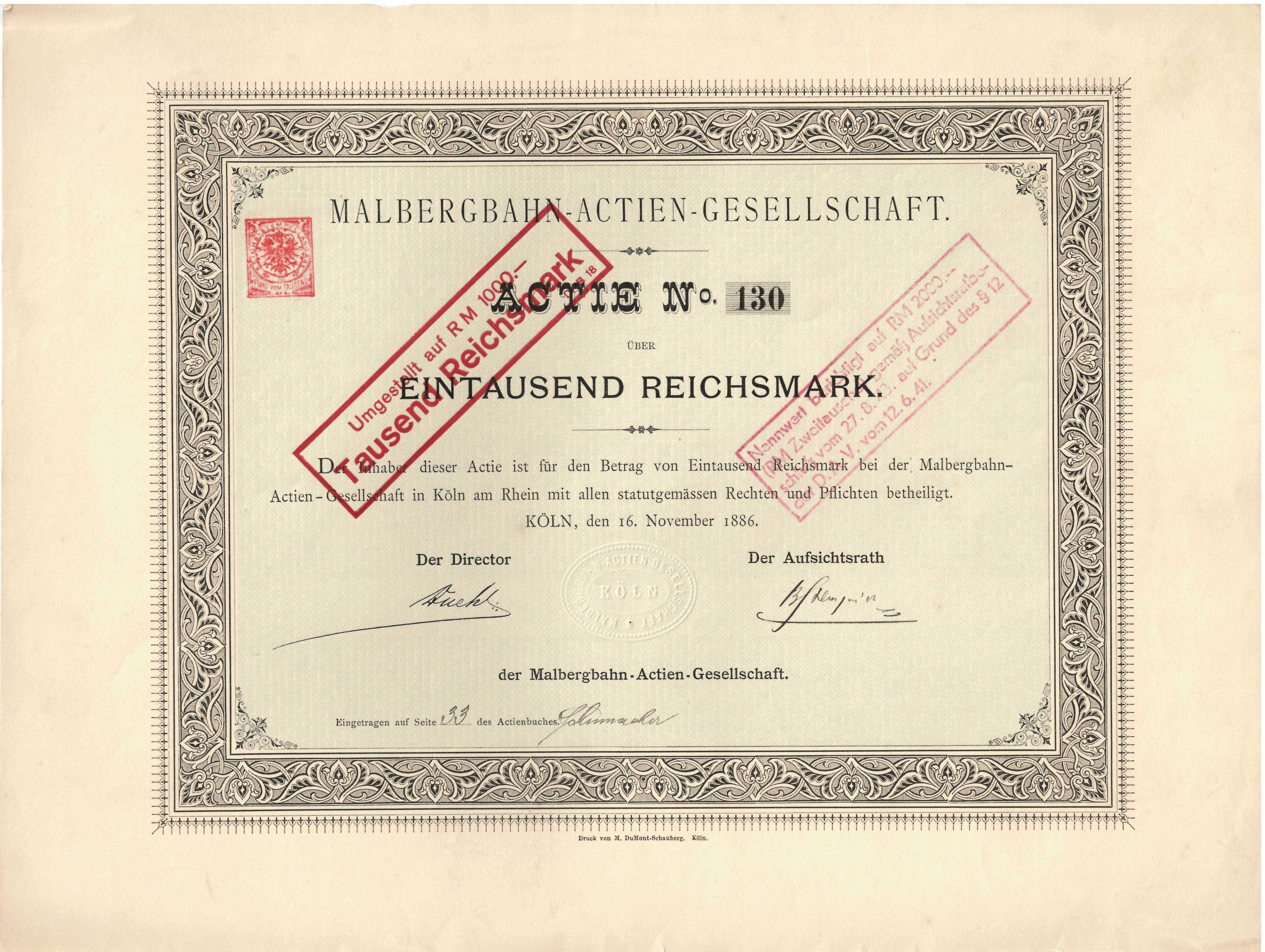
Share certificate for 1,000 Reichsmark of Malbergbahn AG from 16 November 1886

Construction work on the hotel and funicular began as early as November 1886. On 5 June 1887, the Malbergbahn was ceremoniously put into operation. In 1926, the concession was transferred from the Malbergbahn AG company to the hotel for a period of 25 years. When the contract was not renewed in 1951, the railway became the property of the Bad Ems municipal utilities. Until the day it was shut down, the railway was well-frequented and consistently well-utilised. The hotel, café, and zoo located on the mountain could only be reached on foot or by the railway.

When TÜV Rheinland identified serious defects in the railway due to its age in 1979, and the city was financially unable to fix them, operations were initially suspended as a temporary measure. On 7 December 1981, the Malbergbahn was declared an industrial monument. By then, it had suffered significant vandalism and was superficially renovated in 1999. On 20 June 2000, the Bad Ems city council decided not to restore the railway to operation.

One of the railway's carriages is now located at the mountain station, which is no longer accessible due to the risk of collapse. The other carriage remains at the valley station and has since been restored.

Since 1982, a support association with around 150 members has been working to preserve and restore the Malbergbahn to operation.

Since 2014, the valley station and the carriage located there have been renovated and are now used as a café. In 2019, the Bad Ems city council decided to sell the mountain station to an investor.

== Technology ==
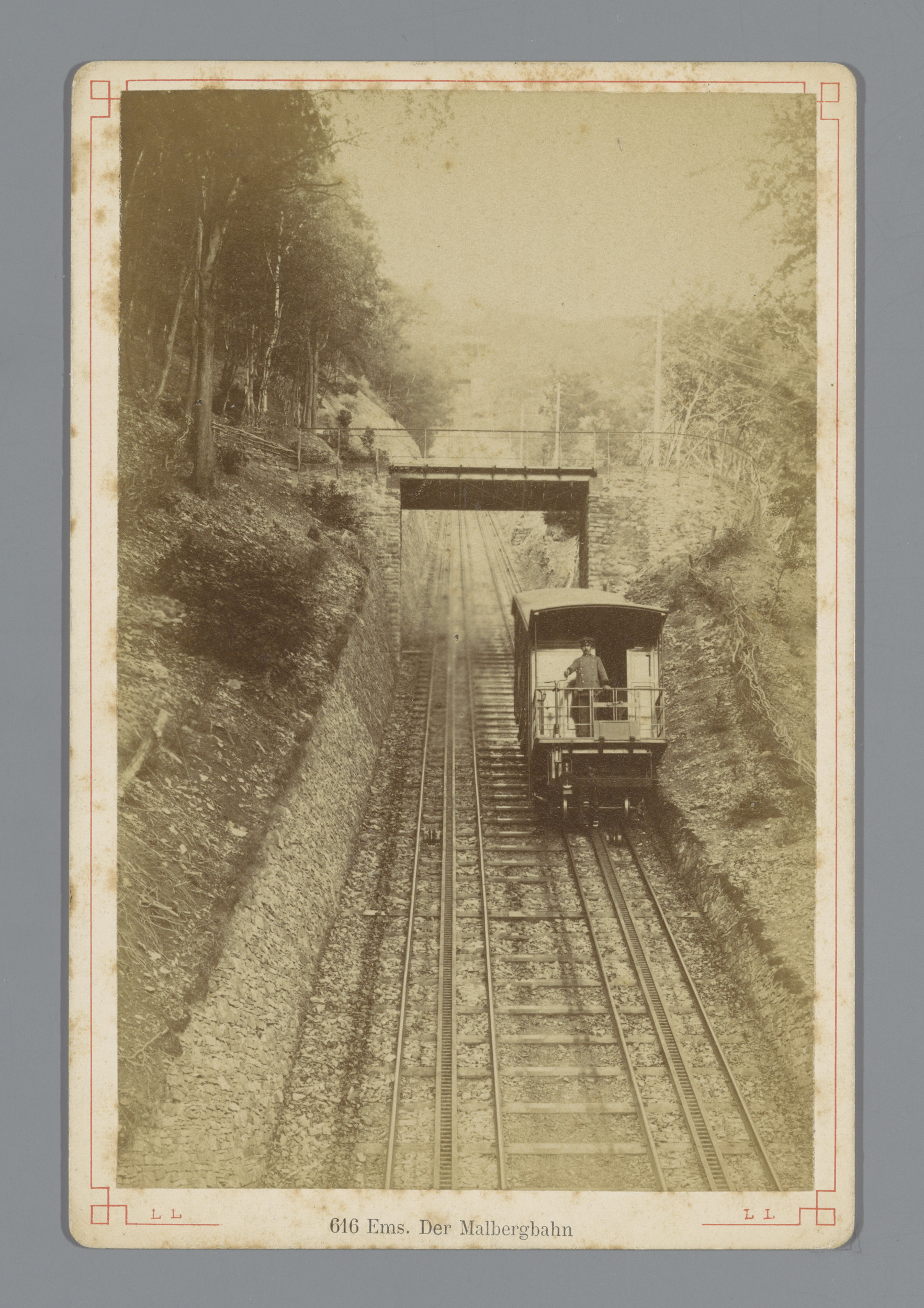
View of the Malbergbahn in the 19th century

The Malbergbahn was a water balance railway with a Riggenbach rack system, which served as the brake rail for braking and regulating the vehicle speed. When the vehicles were stationary, it also functioned as a parking brake. The dual-track line had a track gauge of 1,000 millimetres (meter gauge) and was 520 metres long. It overcame a height difference of 260 metres with a maximum gradient of 54.5 percent (545 ‰). The maximum speed was 7 km/h until 1963, after which it increased to 12 km/h, with an average speed of 5.4 km/h. The traction cable was made of six pre-formed strands, each consisting of 19 wires on a fibre core. The railway was powered by hydroelectricity, with the operational water pumped from the valley to a storage reservoir on the mountain.

== Gallery ==
The gallery shows the condition before and after the partial restoration.

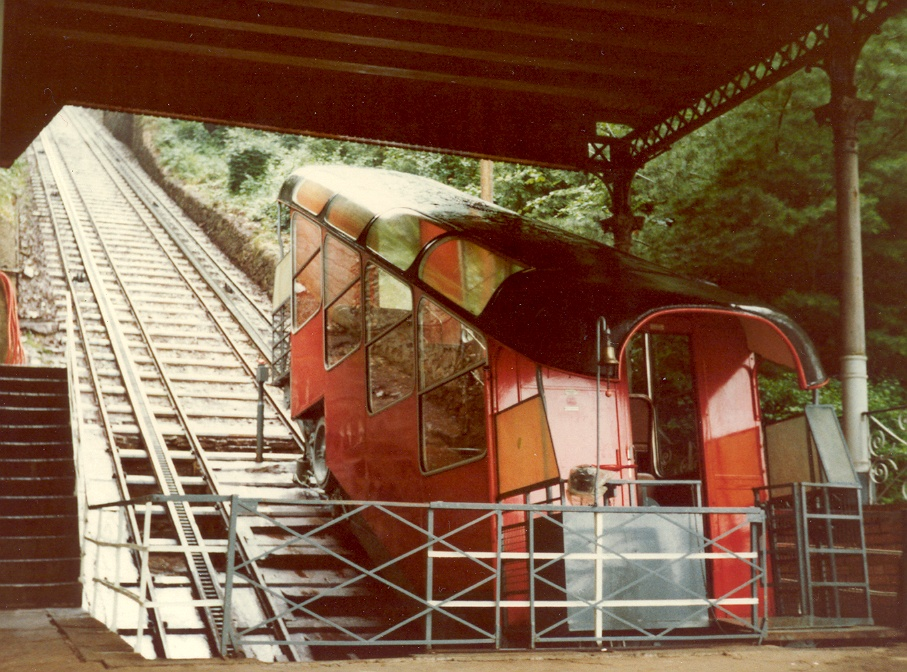
Car in the valley station in 1978

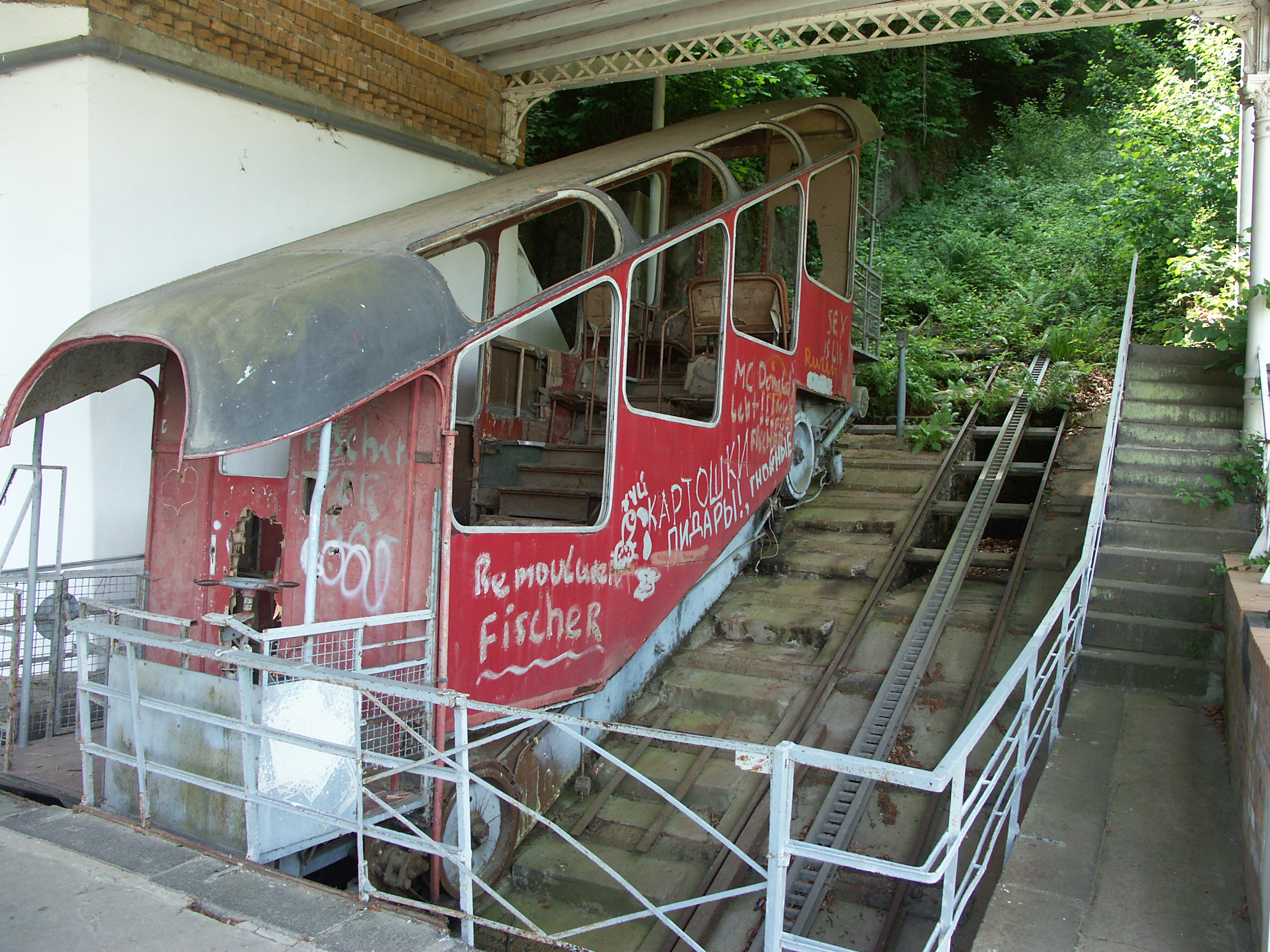
Car in the valley station in the year 2008

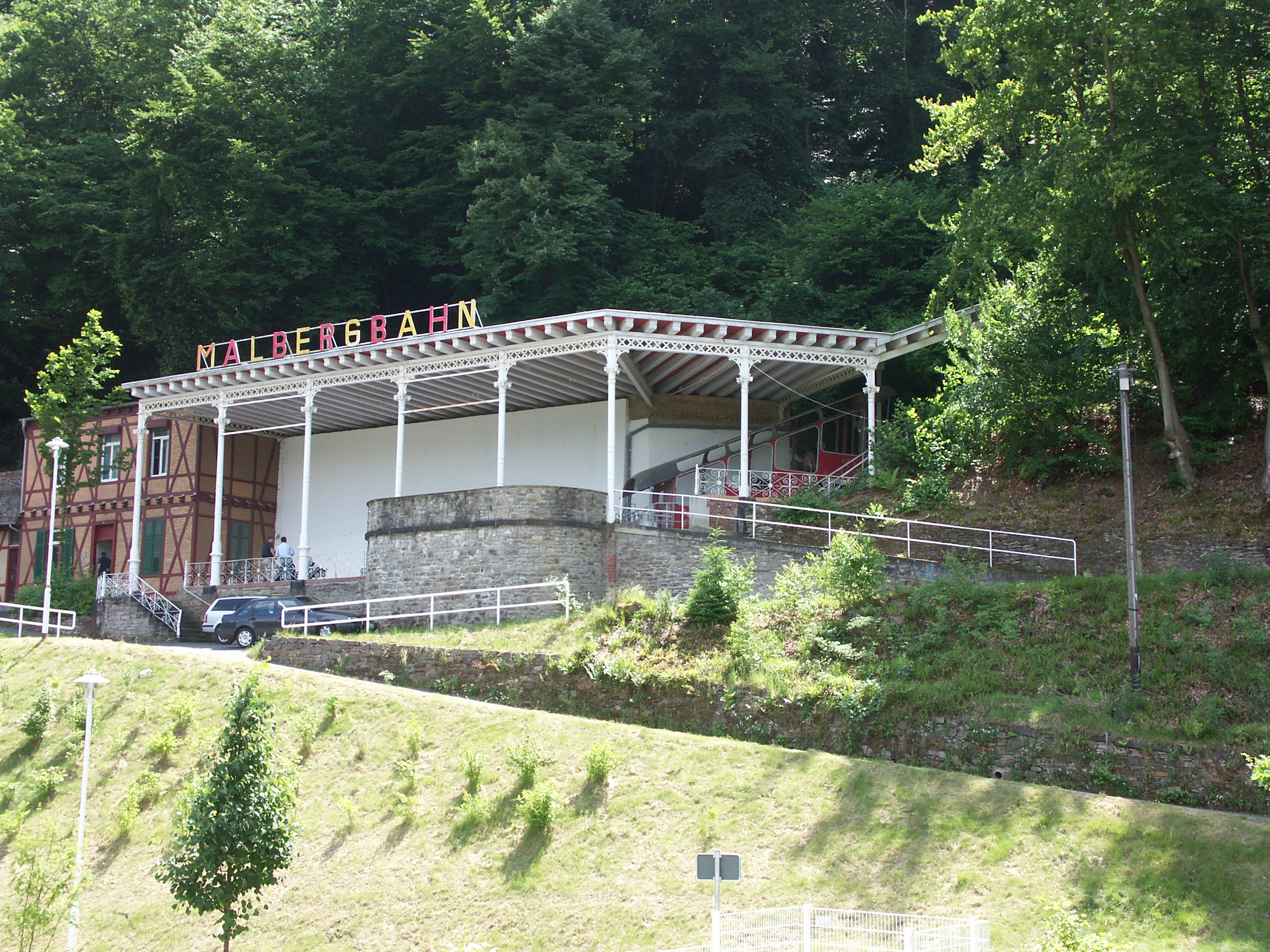
Valley station in the year 2008

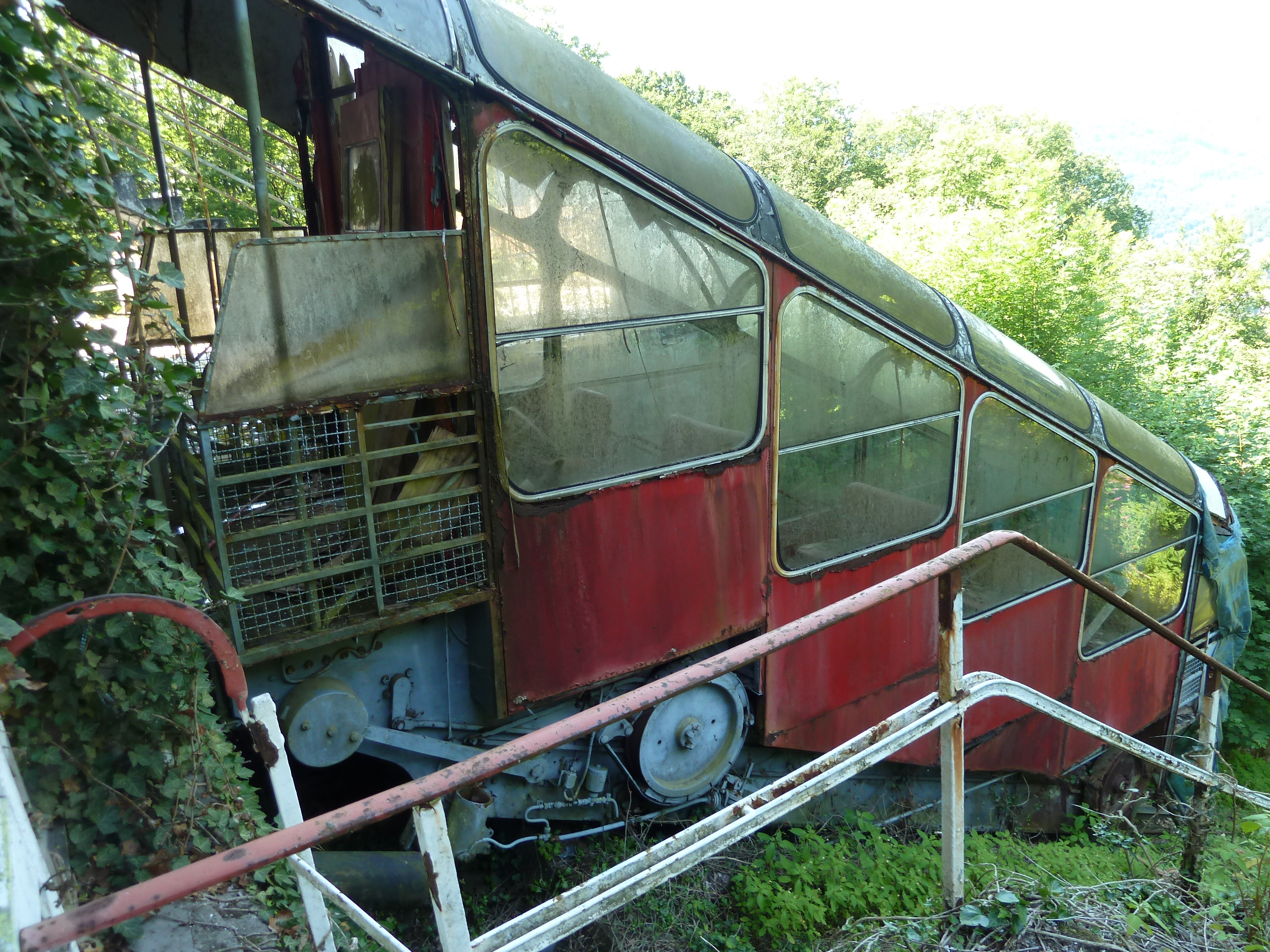
Rotting car in the mountain station in 2013

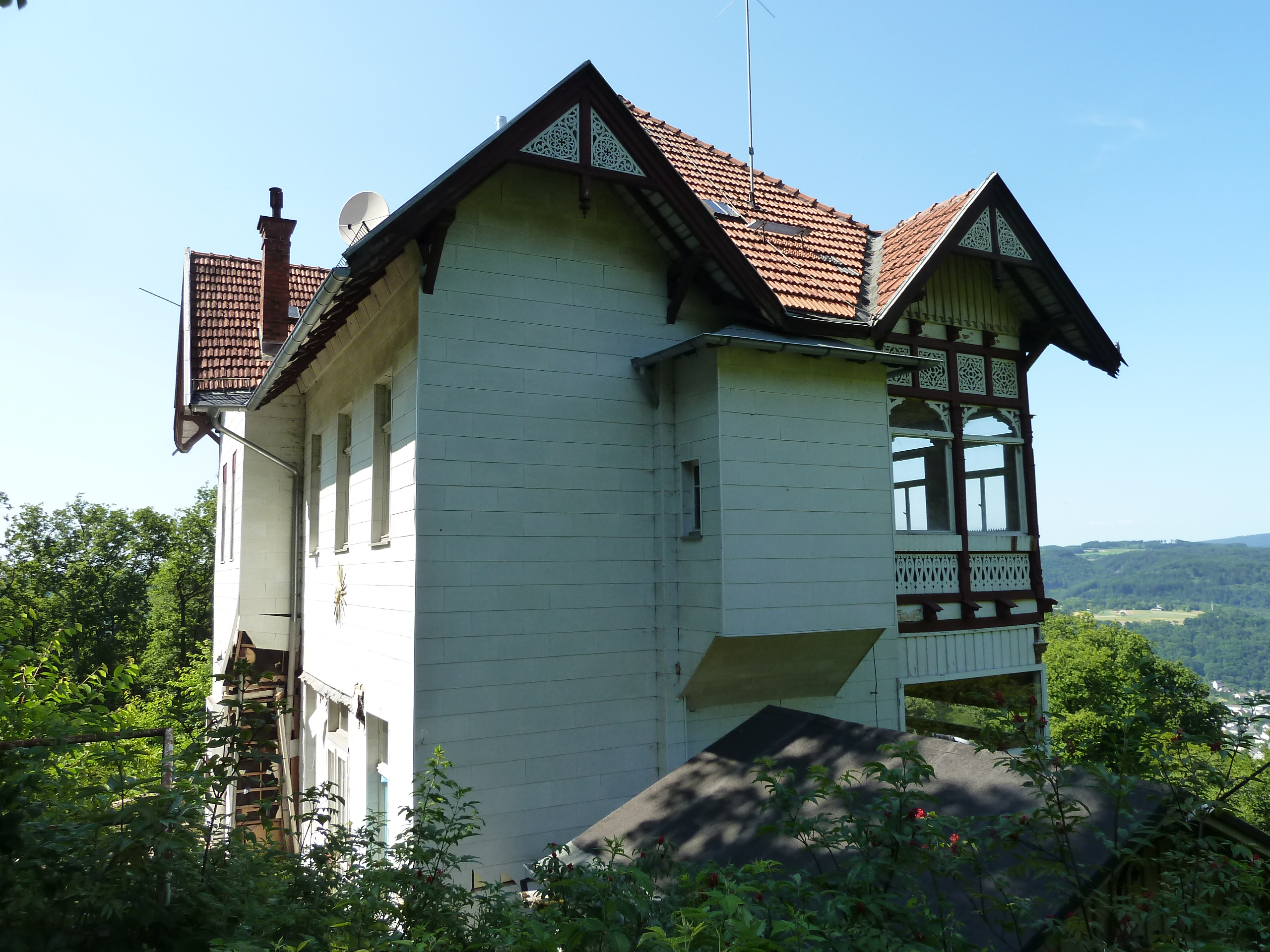
Mountain station in 2013

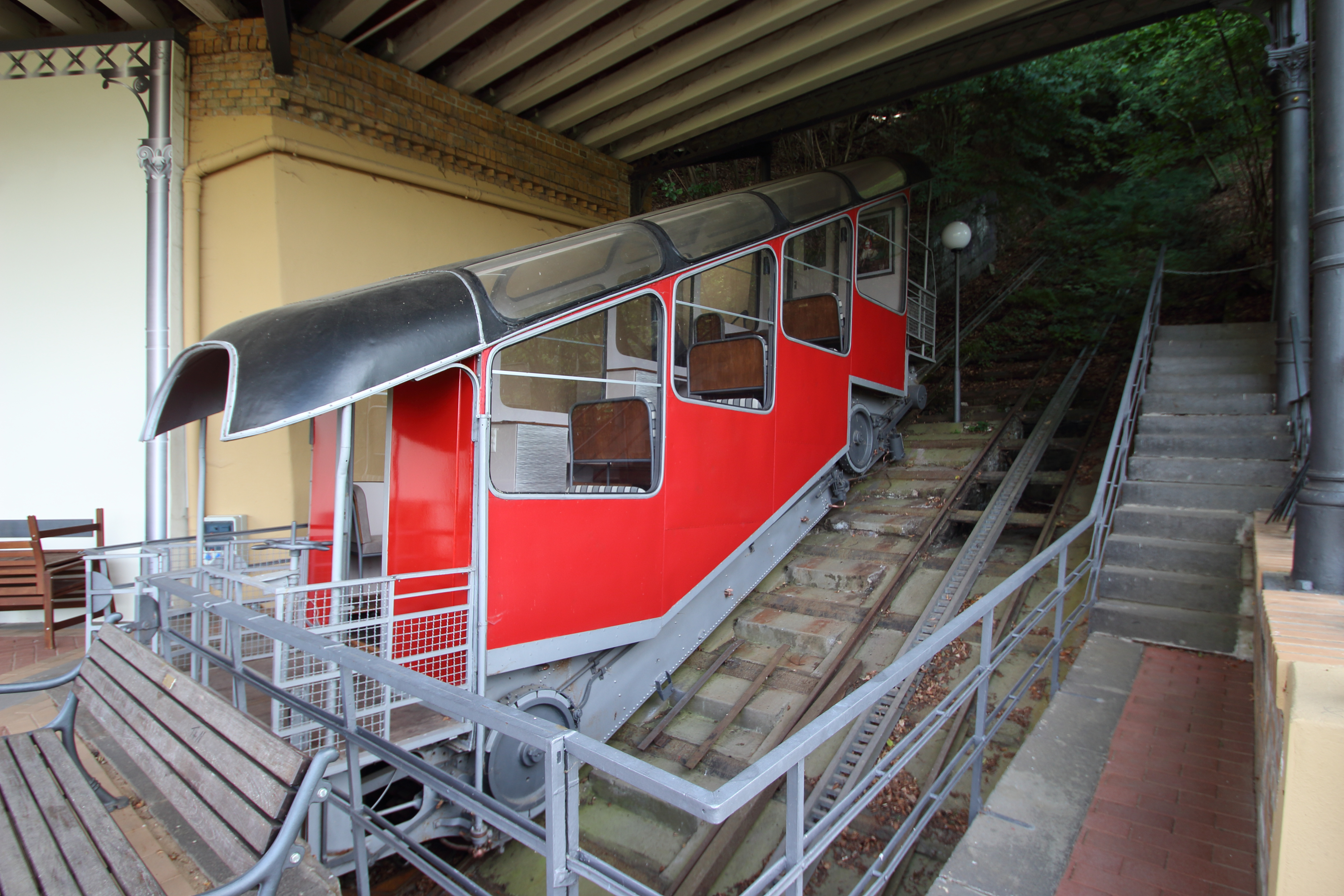
Renovated car in the valley station in 2018

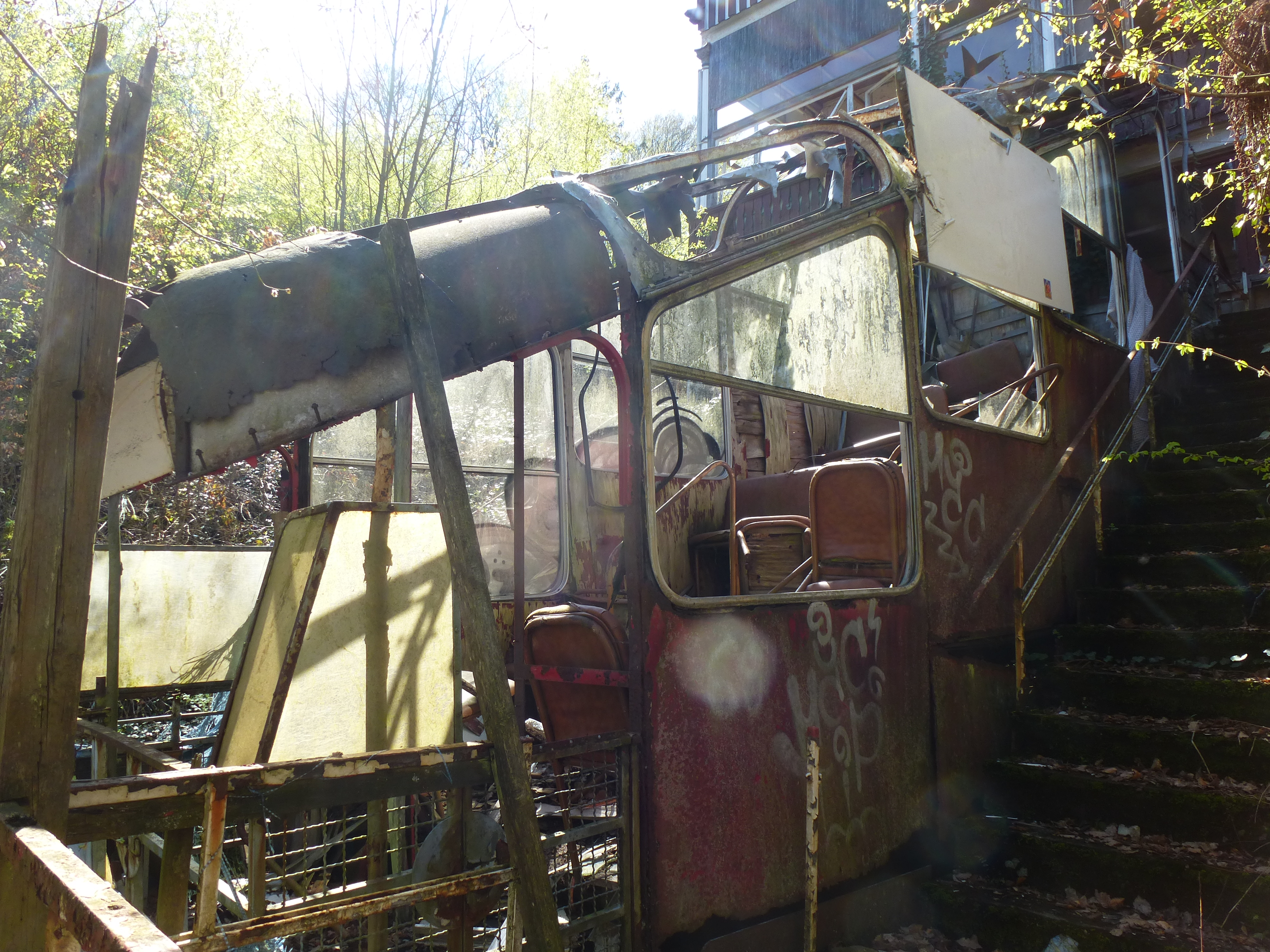
Car in the mountain station in 2019

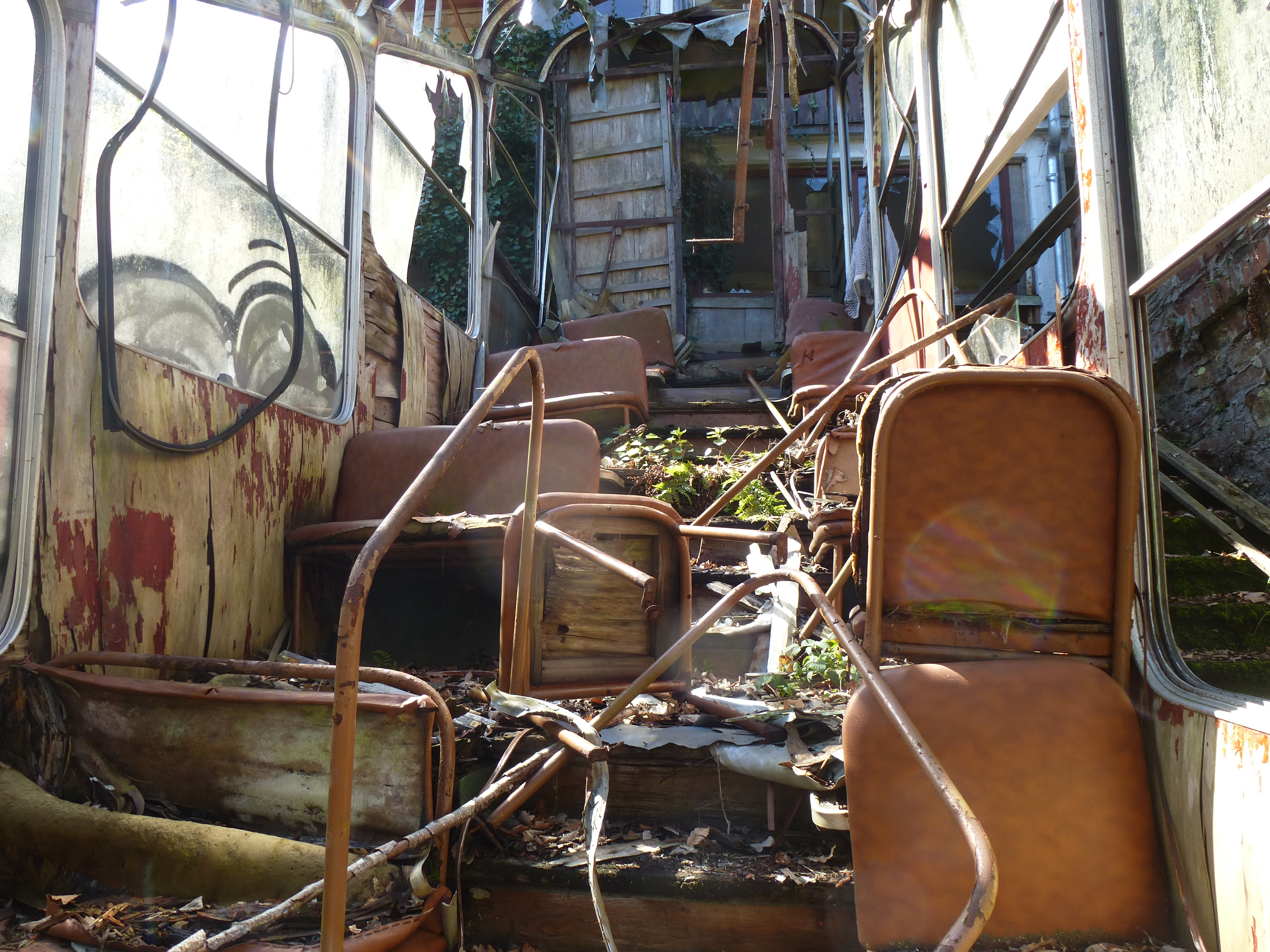
Car in the mountain station in 2019

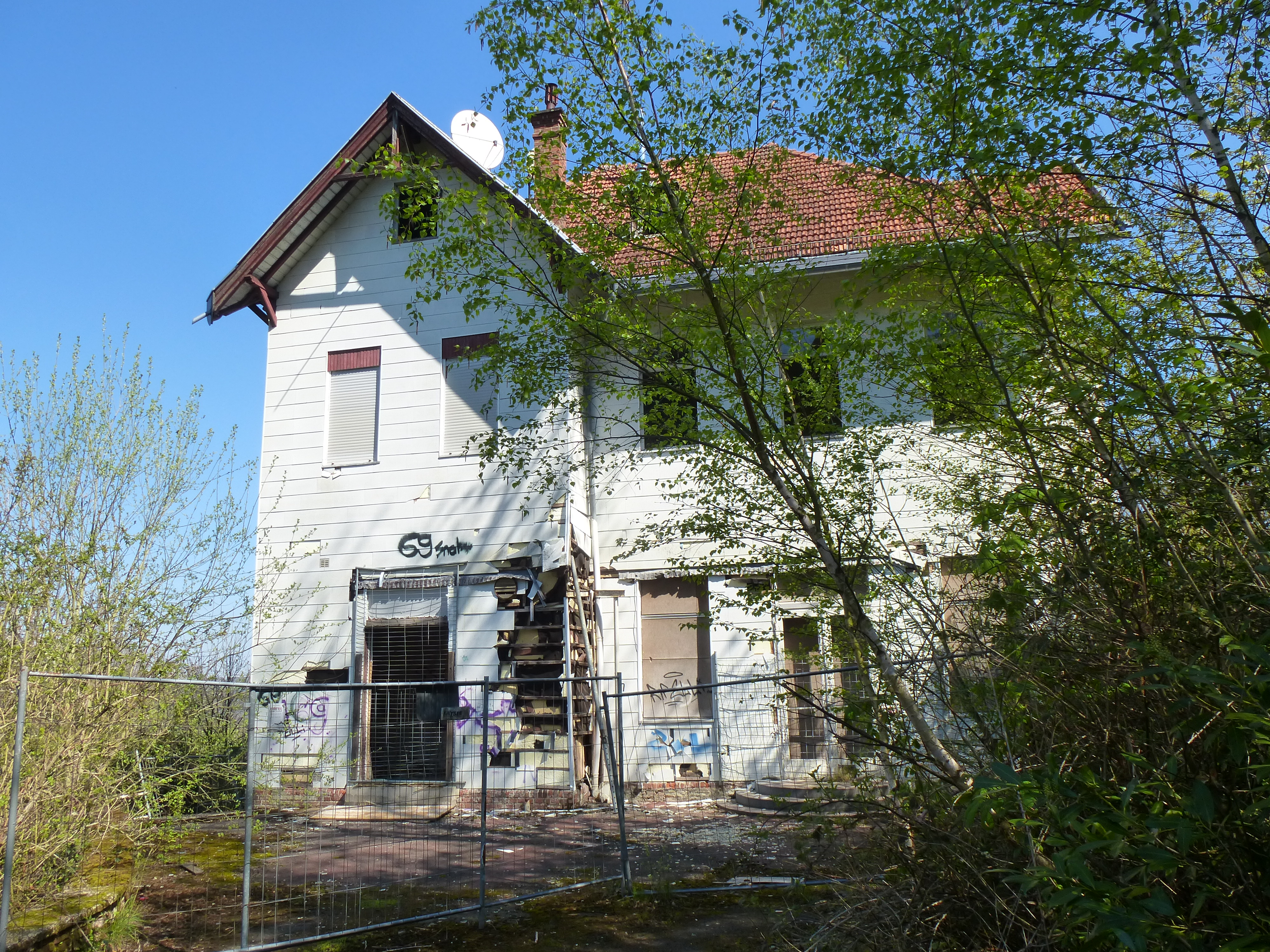
Mountain station in 2019

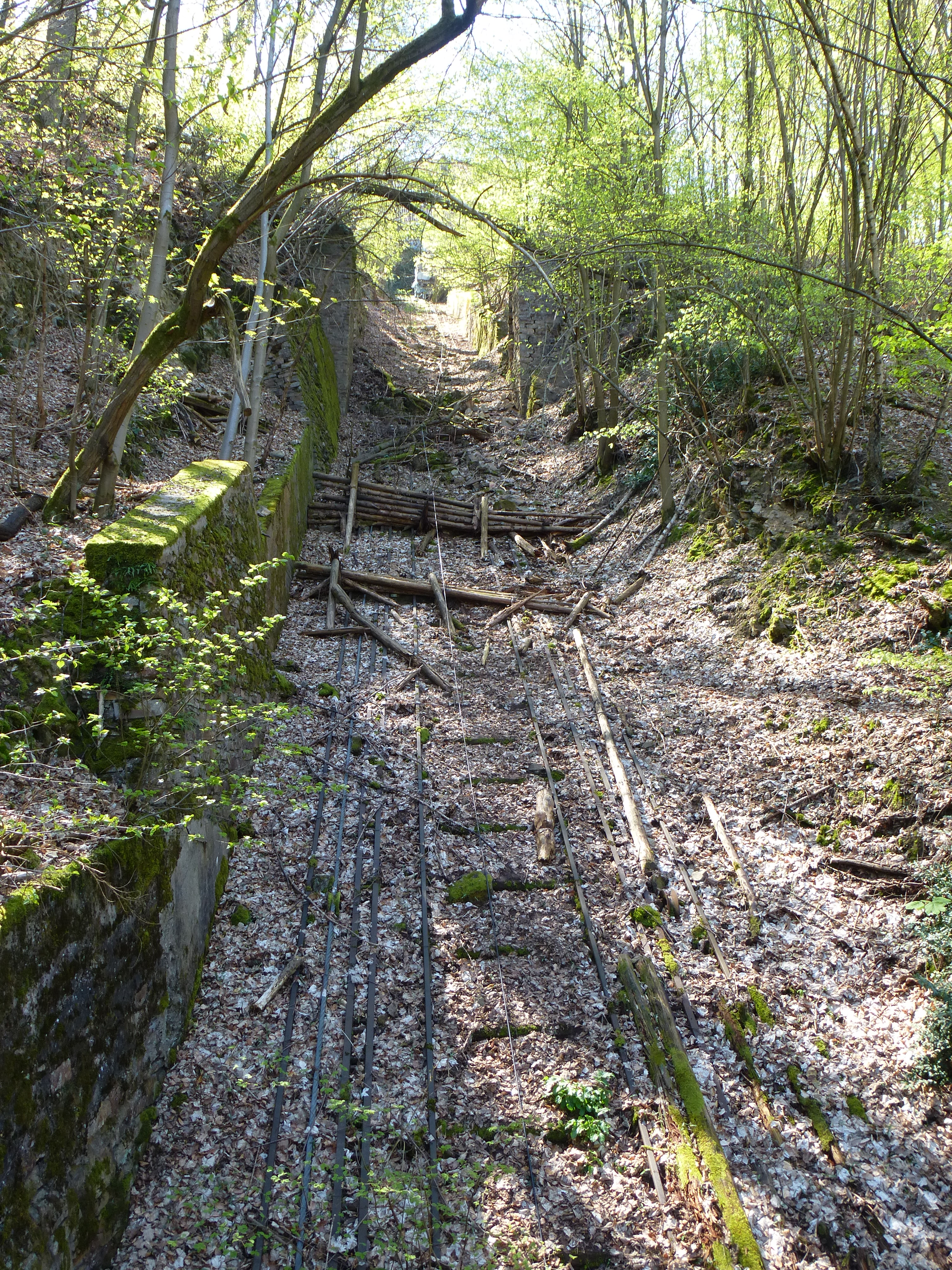
Route of the railway in 2019

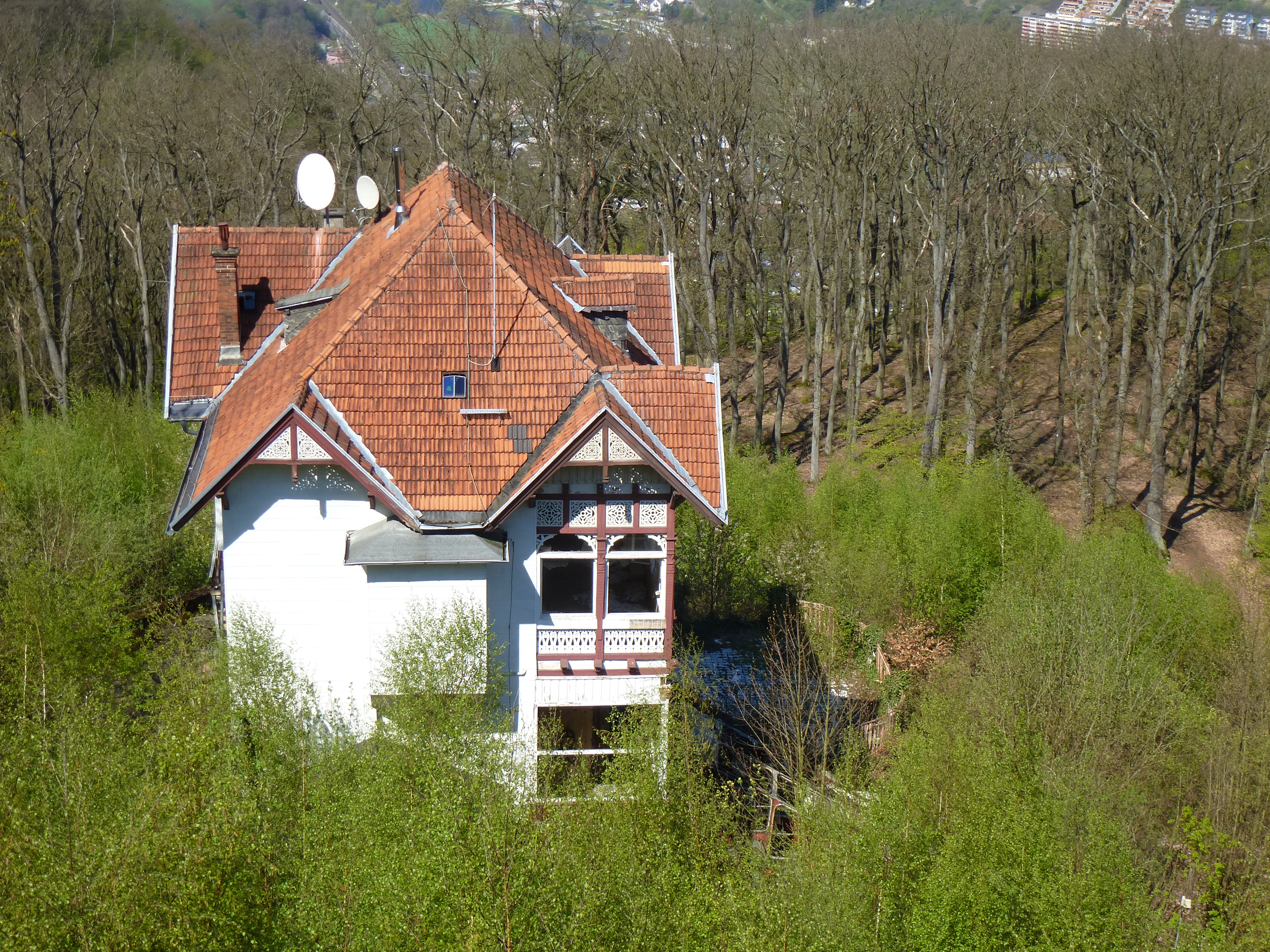
Route of the railway in 2019

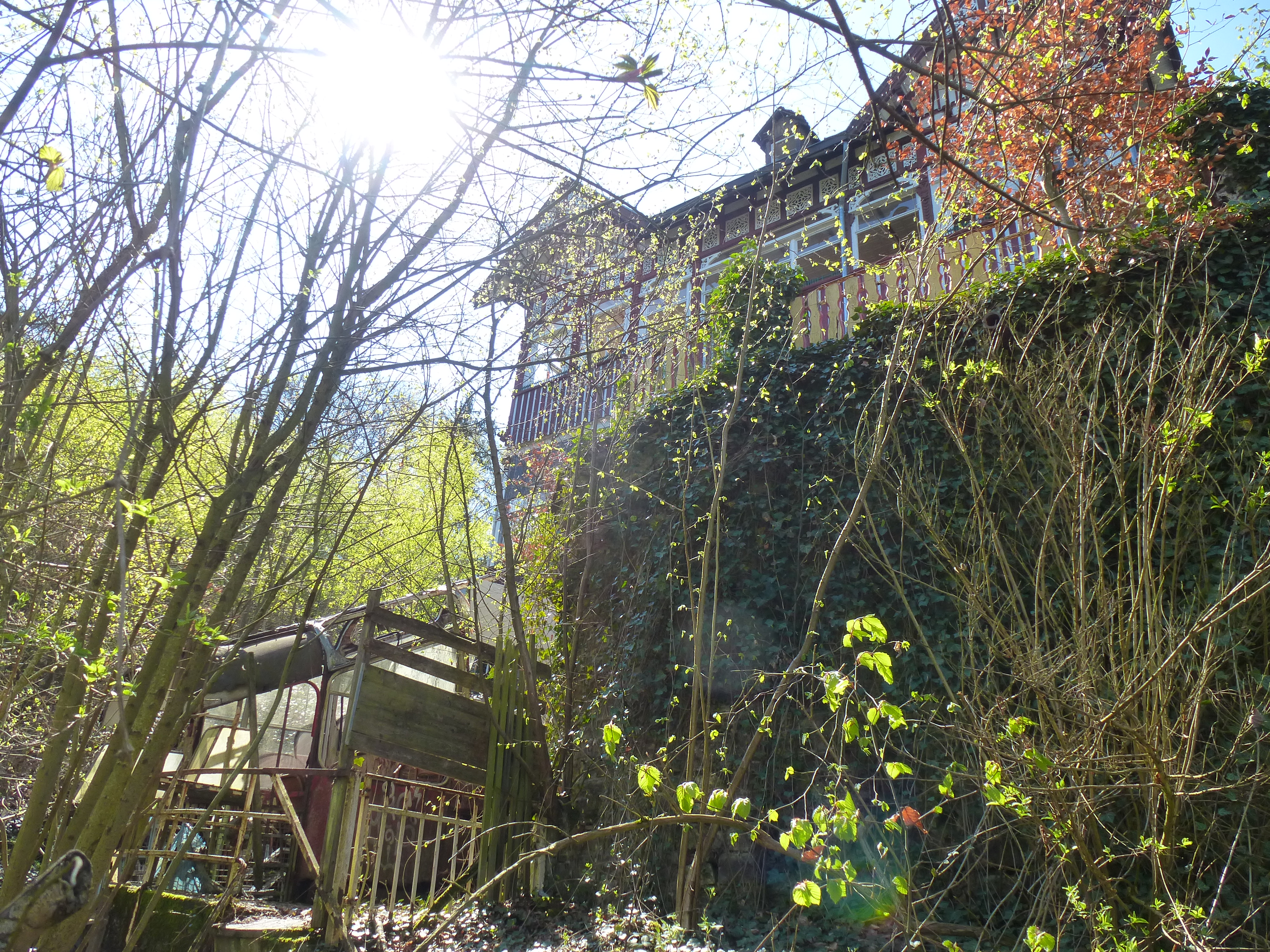
Mountain station with car in 2019

== See also ==
- List of funicular railways
