= Bad Ems =

- Town
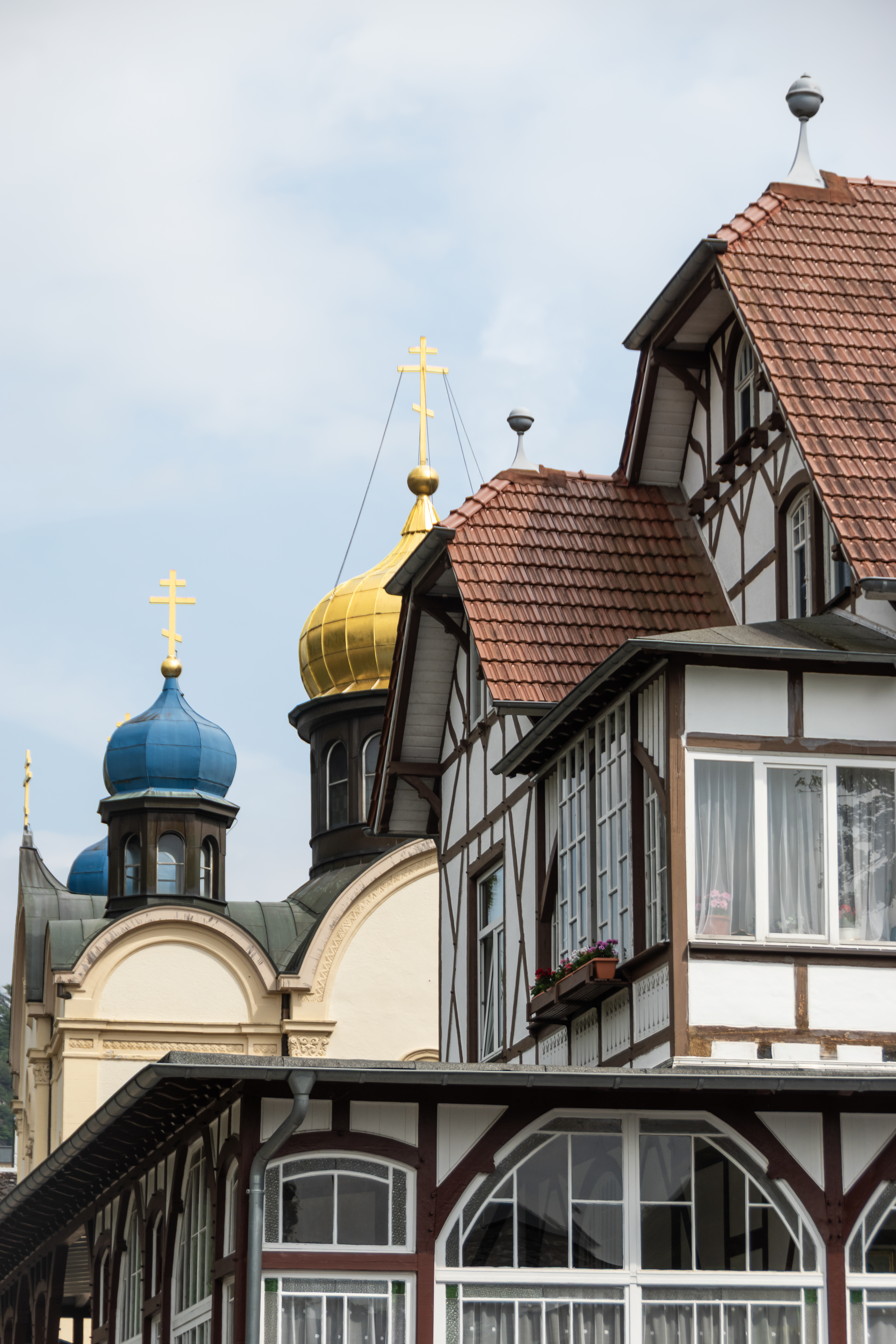
- Buildings along Wilhelmsallee

- Flag Coat of arms

- Location of Bad Ems within Rhein-Lahn-Kreis district
- Interactive map of Bad Ems
- Location within Germany Location within Rhineland-Palatinate
- Coordinates: 50°20′17″N 7°42′38″E
- Country: Germany
- State: Rhineland-Palatinate
- District: Rhein-Lahn-Kreis
- Municipal assoc.: Bad Ems-Nassau

Government
  - Mayor (2019–24): Oliver Krügel (CDU)

Area
  - Total: 15.41 km^{2} (5.95 sq mi)
- Elevation: 80 m (260 ft)

Population (2025-12-31)
  - Total: 10,048
  - Density: 652.0/km^{2} (1,689/sq mi)
- Time zone: UTC+01:00 (CET)
  - Summer (DST): UTC+02:00 (CEST)
- Postal codes: 56130
- Dialling codes: 02603
- Vehicle registration: EMS, DIZ, GOH
- Website: www.vgben.de

UNESCO World Heritage Site
- Part of: The Great Spa Towns of Europe
- Criteria: Cultural: (ii)(iii)
- Reference: 1613
- Inscription: 2021 (44th Session)

Bad Ems (German pronunciation: [baːt ˈʔɛms]) is a town in Rhineland-Palatinate, Germany. It is the administrative seat of the Rhein-Lahn rural district and is well known as a spa on the river Lahn. Bad Ems was the seat of Bad Ems collective municipality, which has been merged into the Bad Ems-Nassau collective municipality. The town has around 9,000 inhabitants.

In 2021, the town became part of the transnational UNESCO World Heritage Site under the name "Great Spa Towns of Europe", because of its famous hot springs and 18-20th century architecture bearing testimony to the popularity of spa resorts in Europe during that time.

== Geography ==
The town is located on both banks of the River Lahn, the natural border between the Taunus and the Westerwald, two parts of the Rhenish Slate Mountains. The town and its outer districts are situated within the Nassau Nature Reserve.

== History ==
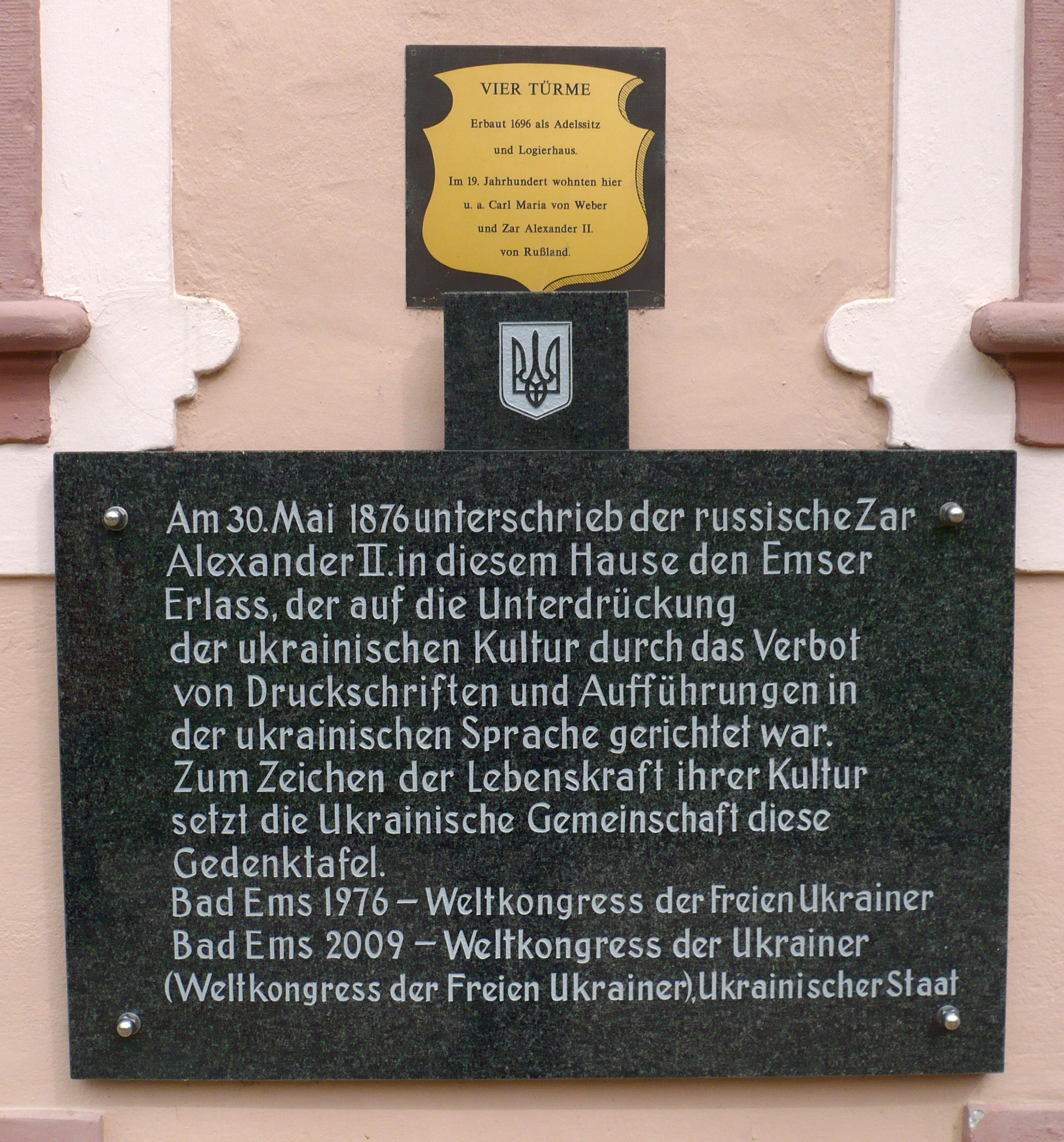
Plaque dedicated to Ems Ukaz in Bad Ems.

In Roman times, a castrum was built at Bad Ems as part of the Upper Germanic Limes, but today not much of the structure remains. In the woods around the town, however, there are distinct traces of the former Roman border.

The town was first mentioned in official documents in 880 and received its town charter in 1324. The Counts of Nassau and Katzenelnbogen rebuilt the bath and used it together with other noble visitors. In the 17th and 18th centuries Bad Ems was considered one of Germany's most famous bathing resorts. It reached its heyday in the 19th century when it welcomed visitors from all over the world and became the summer residence of various European monarchs and artists, including Kaiser Wilhelm I of Germany, Tsars Nicholas I and Alexander II of Russia, Richard Wagner, Fyodor Dostoevsky and Vasili Vasilyevich Vereshchagin, etc.

In 1870, the town, then part of Prussian Hesse-Nassau, became known as the place where the Ems Dispatch originated, instigating the Franco-Prussian War.

In 1876, in the Haus Vier Türme (Four Tower House), the Ems Edict was signed by Alexander II of Russia, banning the use of the Ukrainian language. Today, a monument at the spot commemorates this historical event.

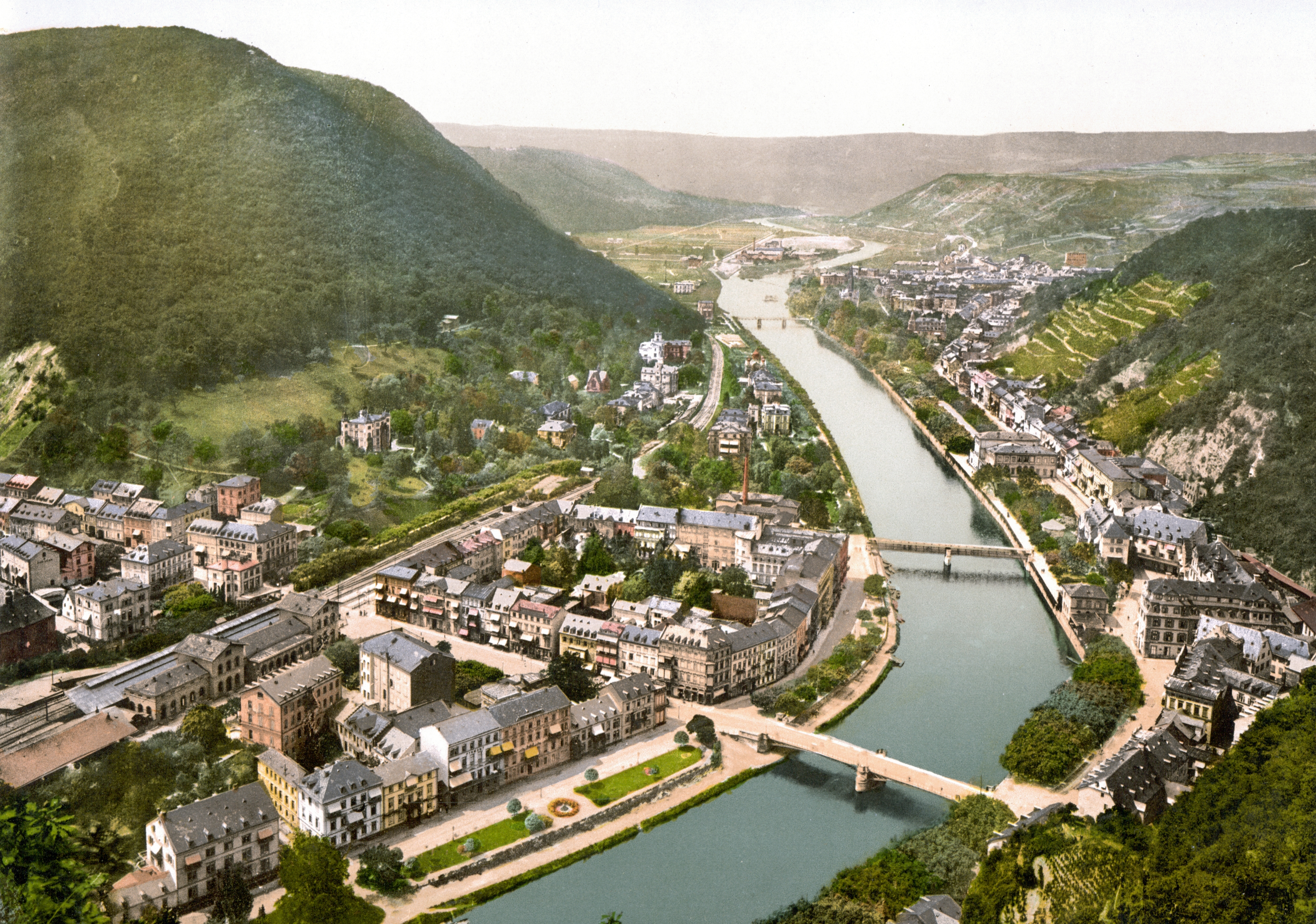
View of the town in 1900.

=== Mining ===
In the 19th and 20th centuries a lot of mining for metal ores took place in the town, concentrated on lead, silver, zinc and copper. The Romans had already dug for ores using open cast mining, which continued throughout the Middle Ages. The many indentations on Blöskopf Hill bear witness to this period of history. As time went by, the method changed from open cast mining to underground mining with tunnels and shafts. Mining of this kind is first mentioned in a document dated 1158, and it continued on into the 18th century, although with long interruptions.

The advent of the Industrial Revolution led to the expansion of the mine, which from 1871 operated under the name of Emser Blei- und Silberwerk AG (Bad Ems Lead and Silver Works, Inc.). In 1909 the company was taken over by what later became the Stolberger Zink AG (Stolberg Zinc Inc.) and mining continued until the end of the Second World War brought things to a halt in 1945. After the war, the mine no longer received any subsidies, but until 1959, stockpiled ore and ore from other mines were sorted at the central preparation plant in Silberau.

Today, the mine is still known as "Mercur", the collective name for various individual pits. Since 1996, the mine has been set up as a museum.

== Economy ==
Industry in Bad Ems is mainly limited to companies related to its spa status, but nonetheless fairly varied, including medicine, electrical engineering and tourism.

=== Mineral springs ===
Bad Ems is located on a cluster of mineral hot springs. These springs are high in sodium bicarbonate and have temperatures between 27 and 57 °C (81 and 135 °F). They originate from groundwater infiltration from the Rhenish Lower Devonian formation. Natural Ems salt is produced from this mineral water, and it is also marketed separately for drinking and inhalation purposes; when inhaled using a vaporizer, the water has a beneficial effect on sore throats.

== Infrastructure ==
=== Transport ===
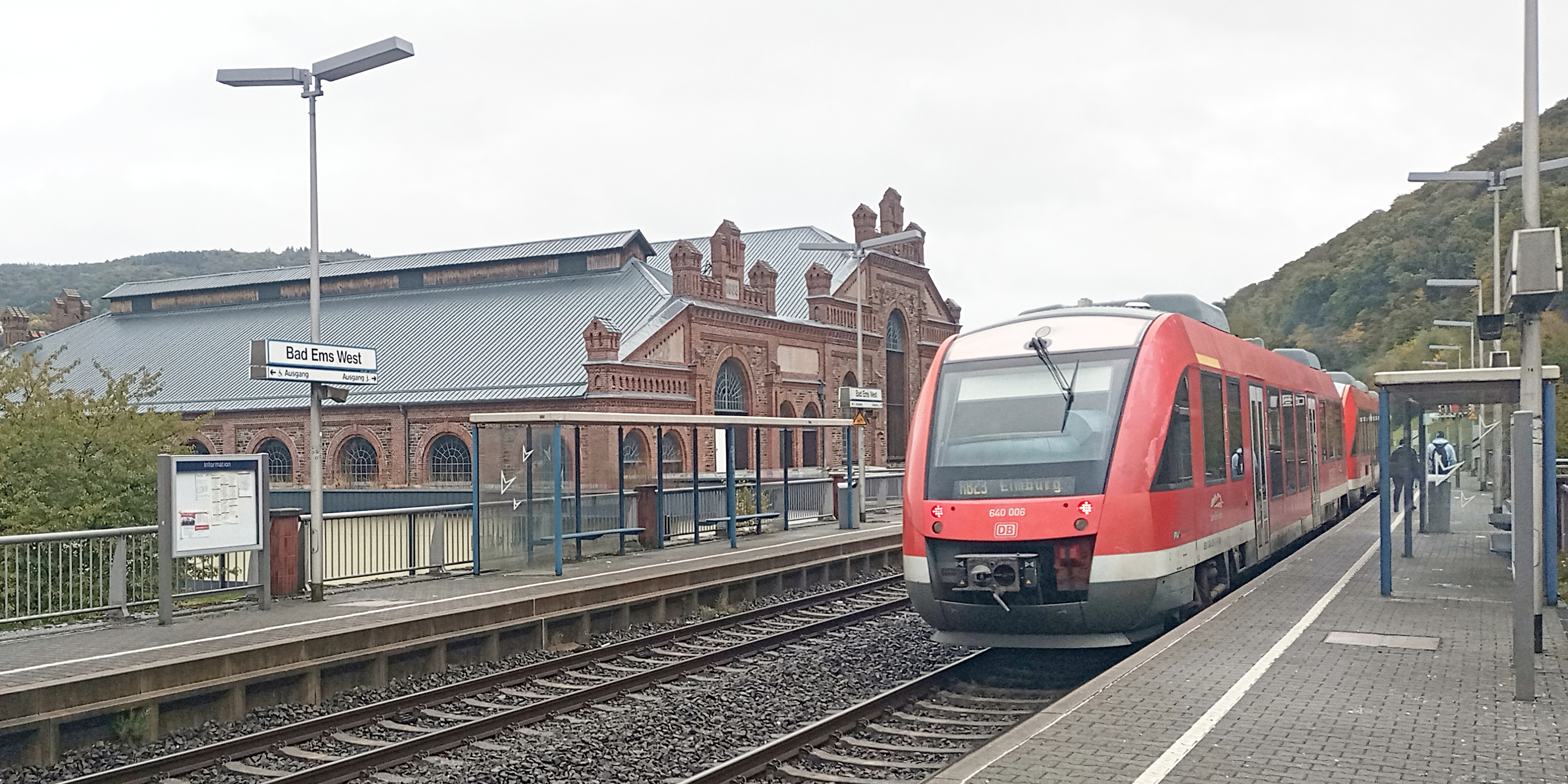
Bad Ems west stop

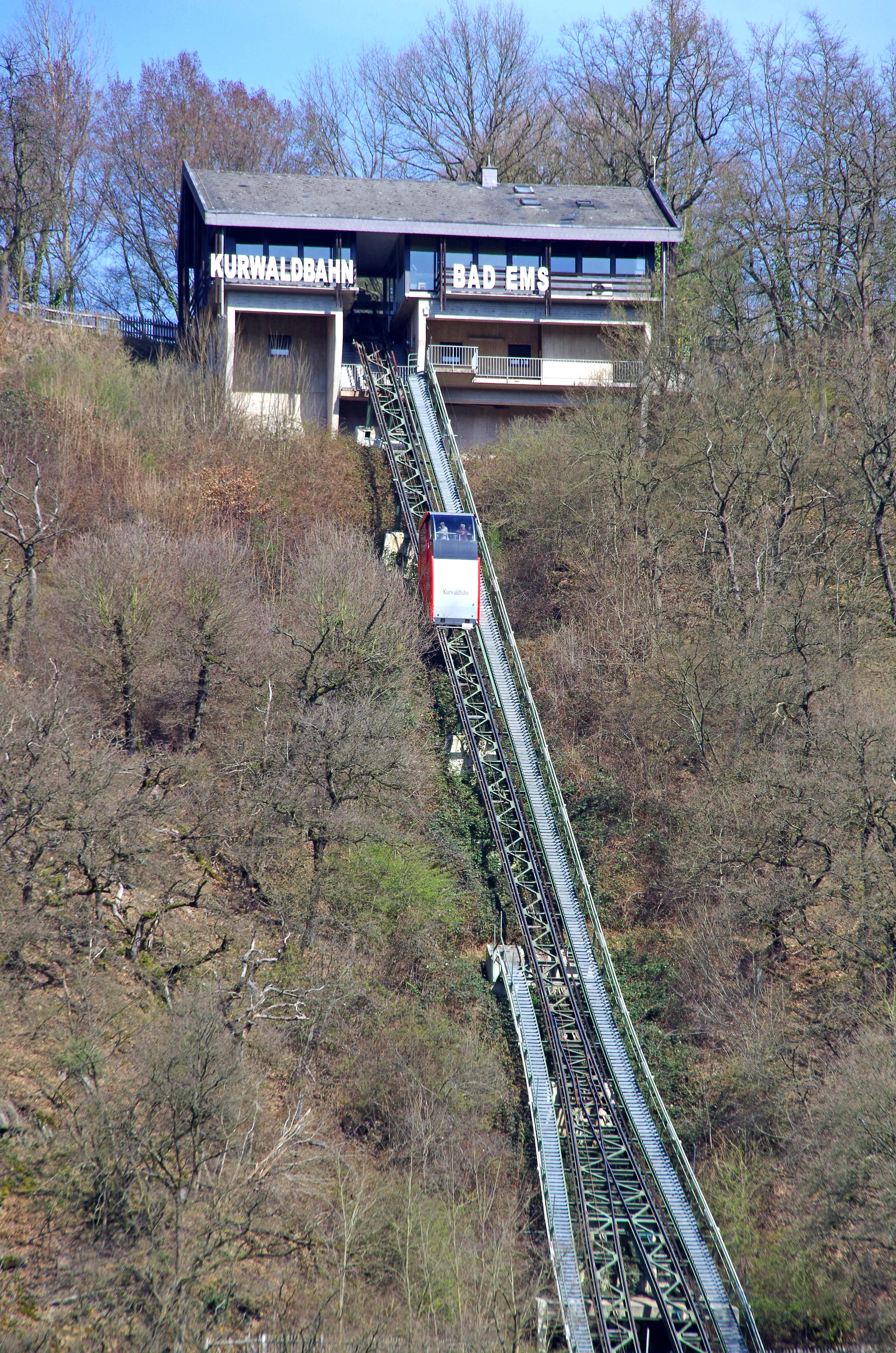
Kurwaldbahn

Bad Ems is served by Bad Ems station, which is on the Lahntal railway. Slow trains also serve Bad Ems West stop.

The town is linked to a view point at the Bismarckturm (Bismarck tower) by the Kurwaldbahn funicular railway. Another (discontinued) form of transport is the Malbergbahn (opposite to the Kurwaldbahn).

Bad Ems is located in the transport association Verkehrsverbund Rhein-Mosel (VRM), zone number 503.

== Gallery ==
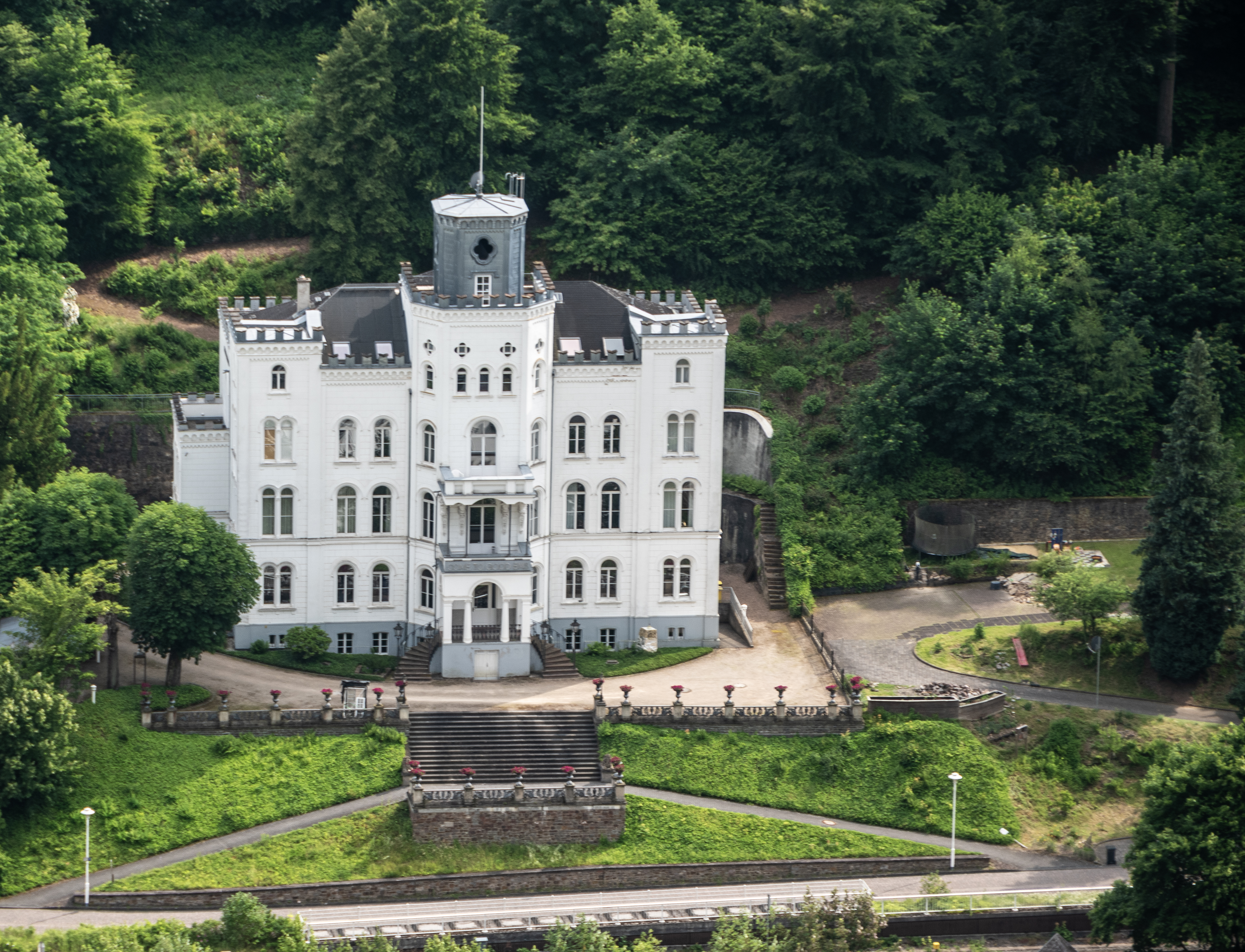
Balmoral Castle (Künstlerhaus Schloss Balmoral)

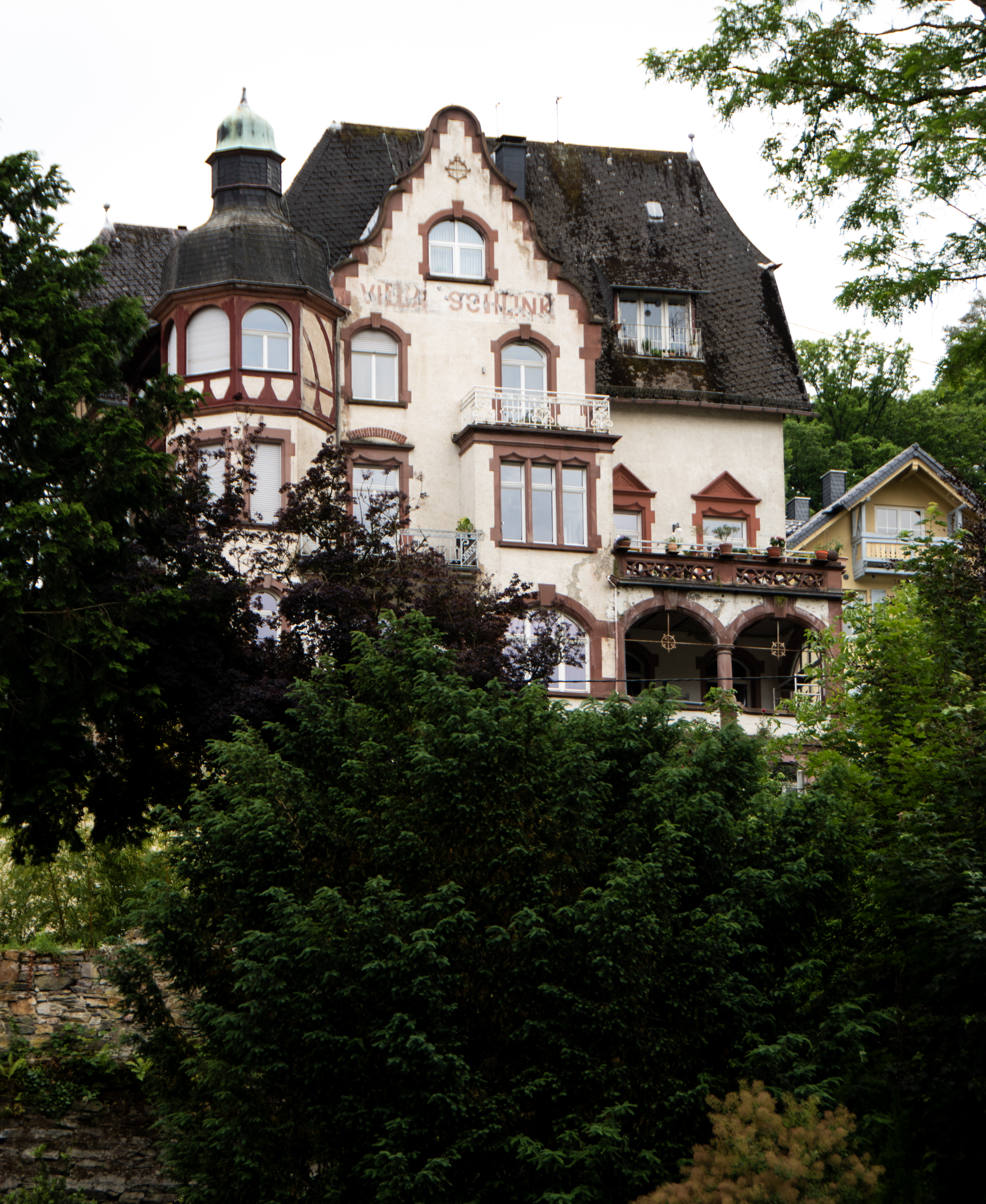
Villa Schlink

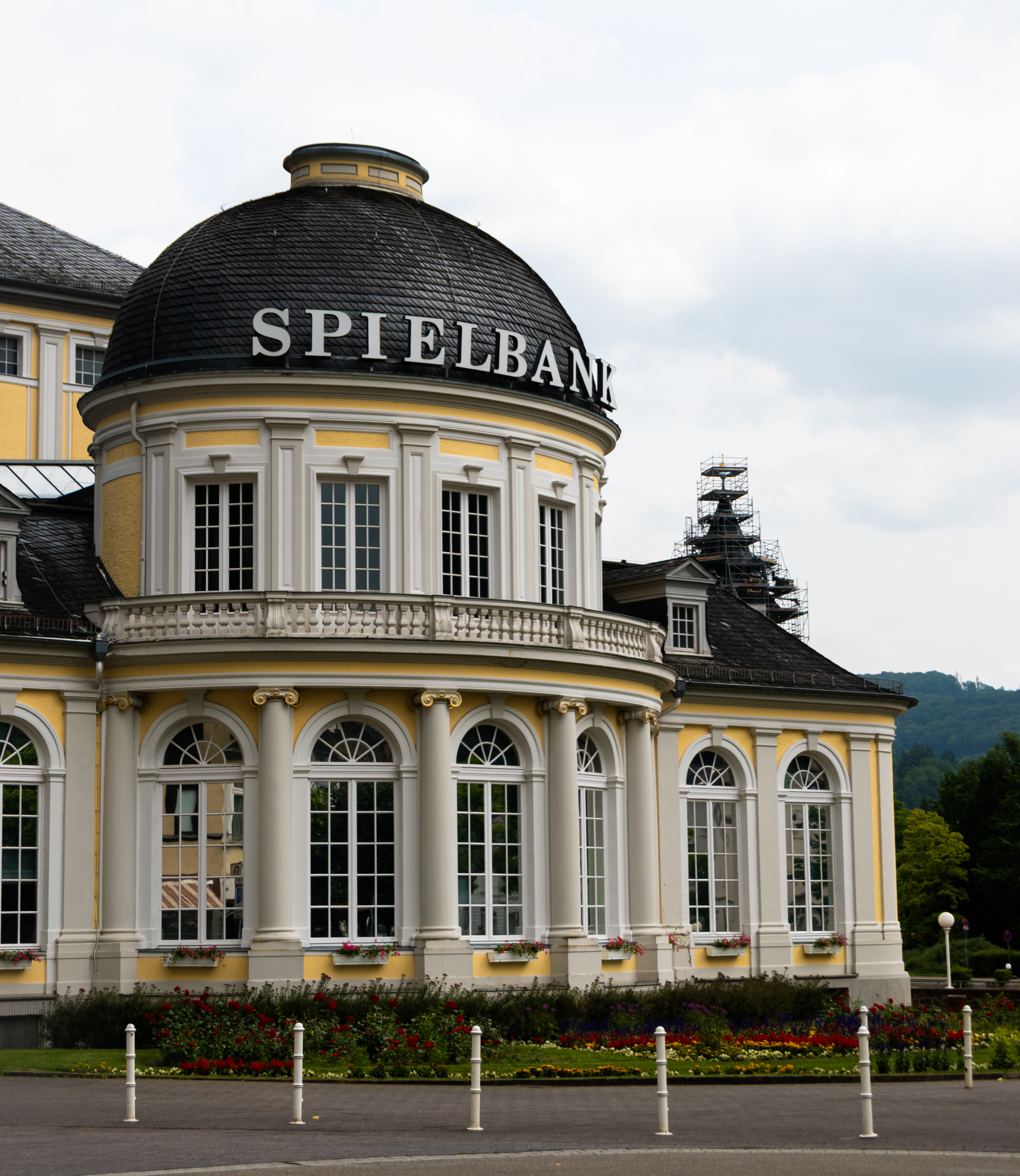
Casino Bad Ems

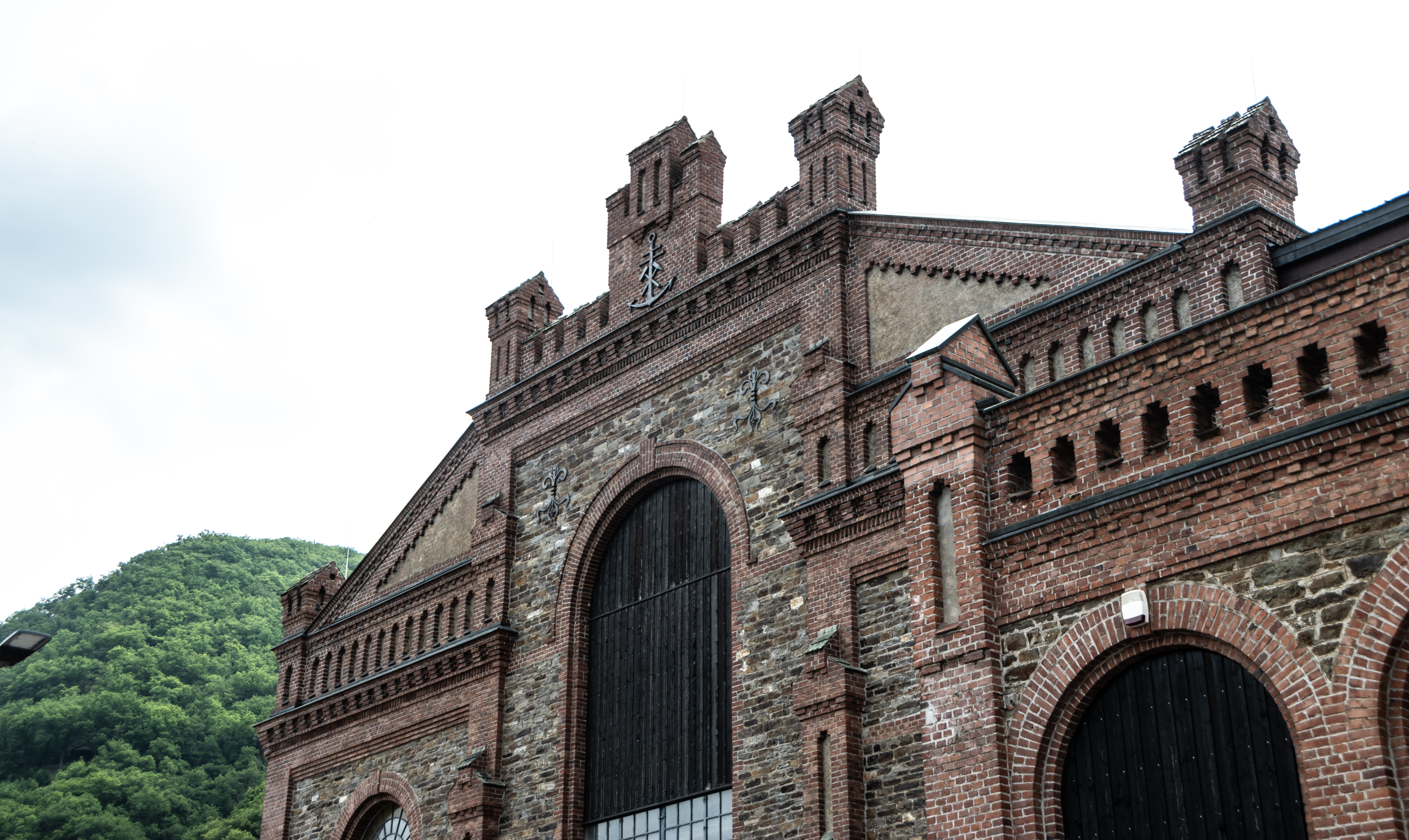
Former building of Emser Lead and Silver Works

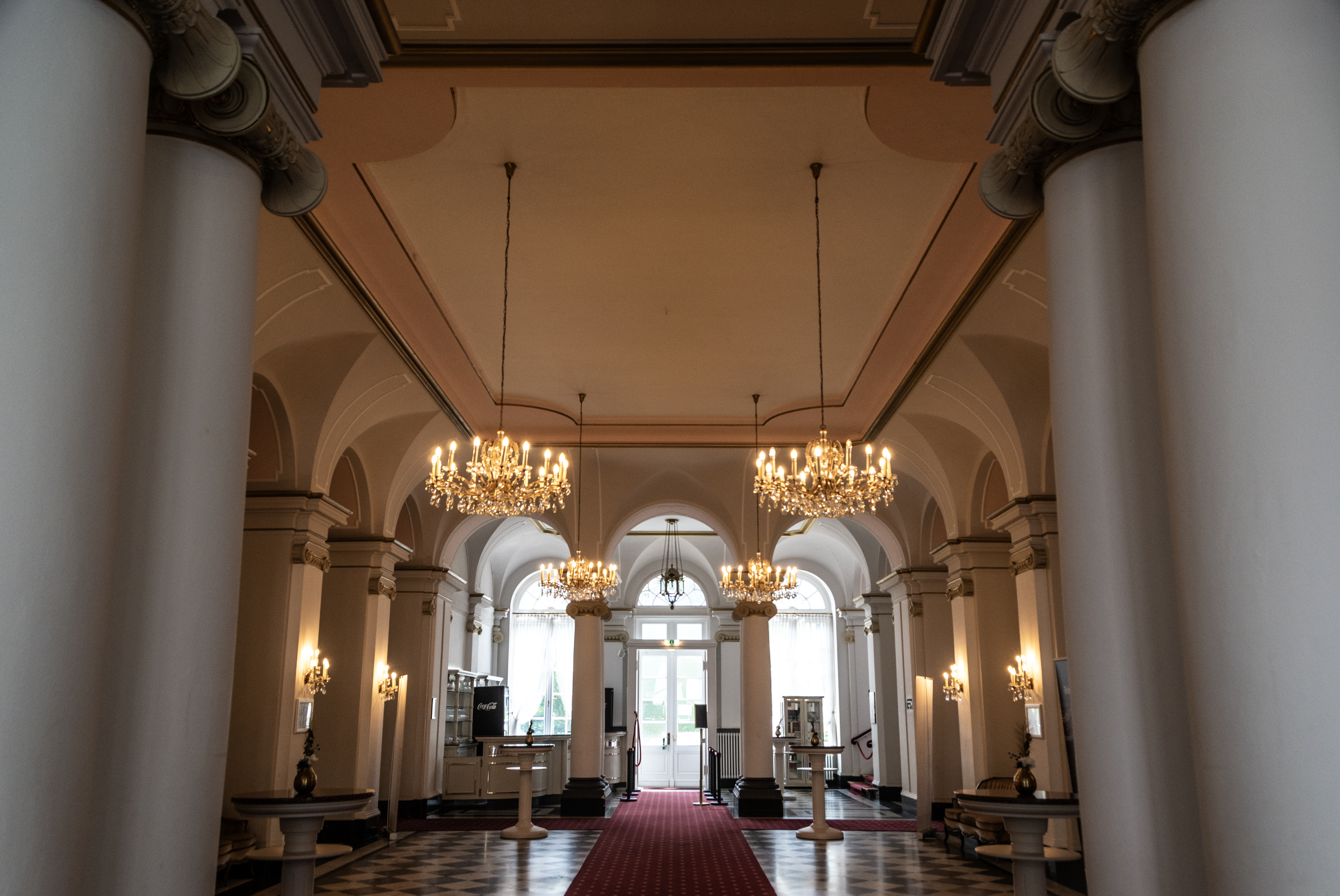
Staatsbad of Bad Ems

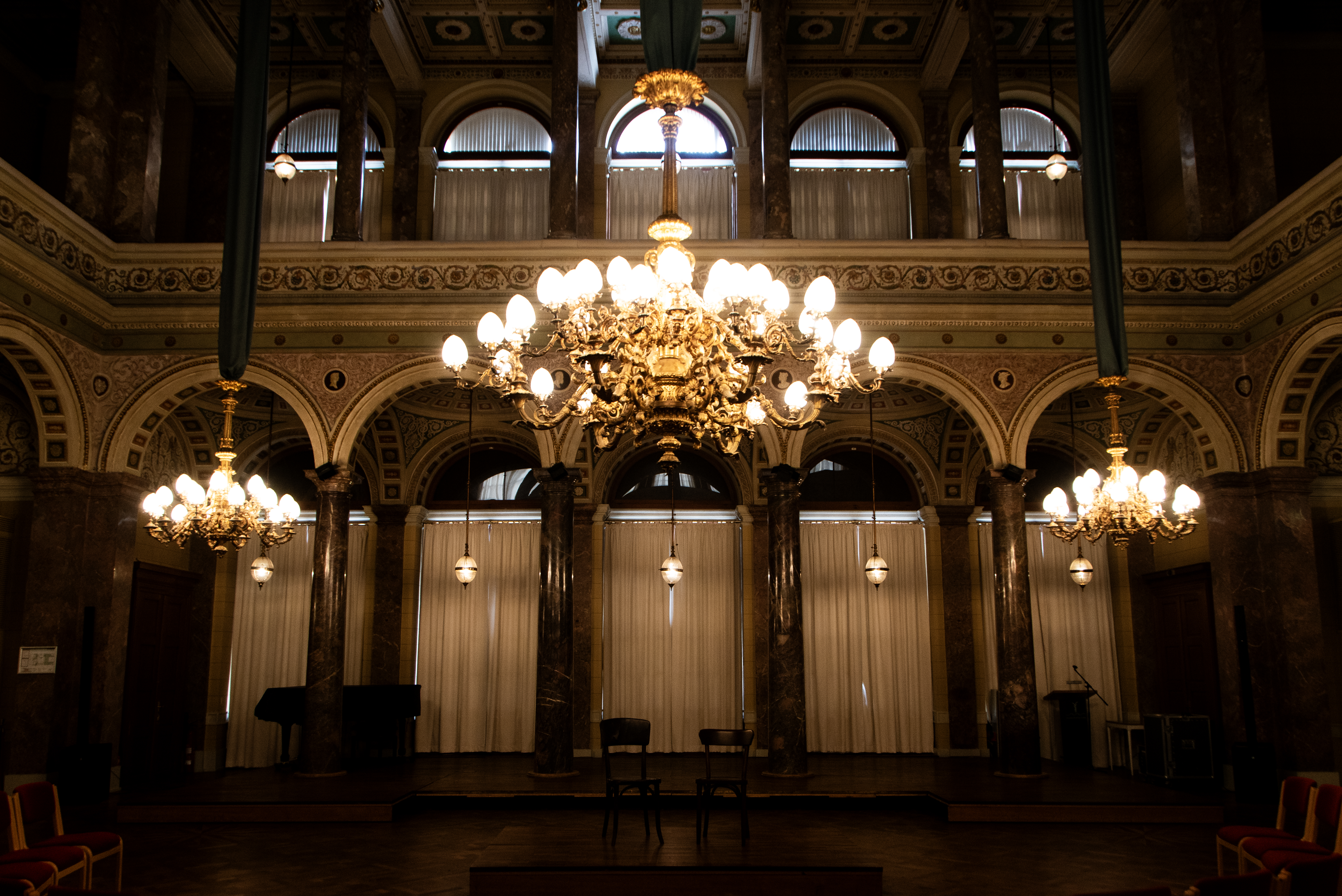
Marble Hall, Staatsbad Bad Ems

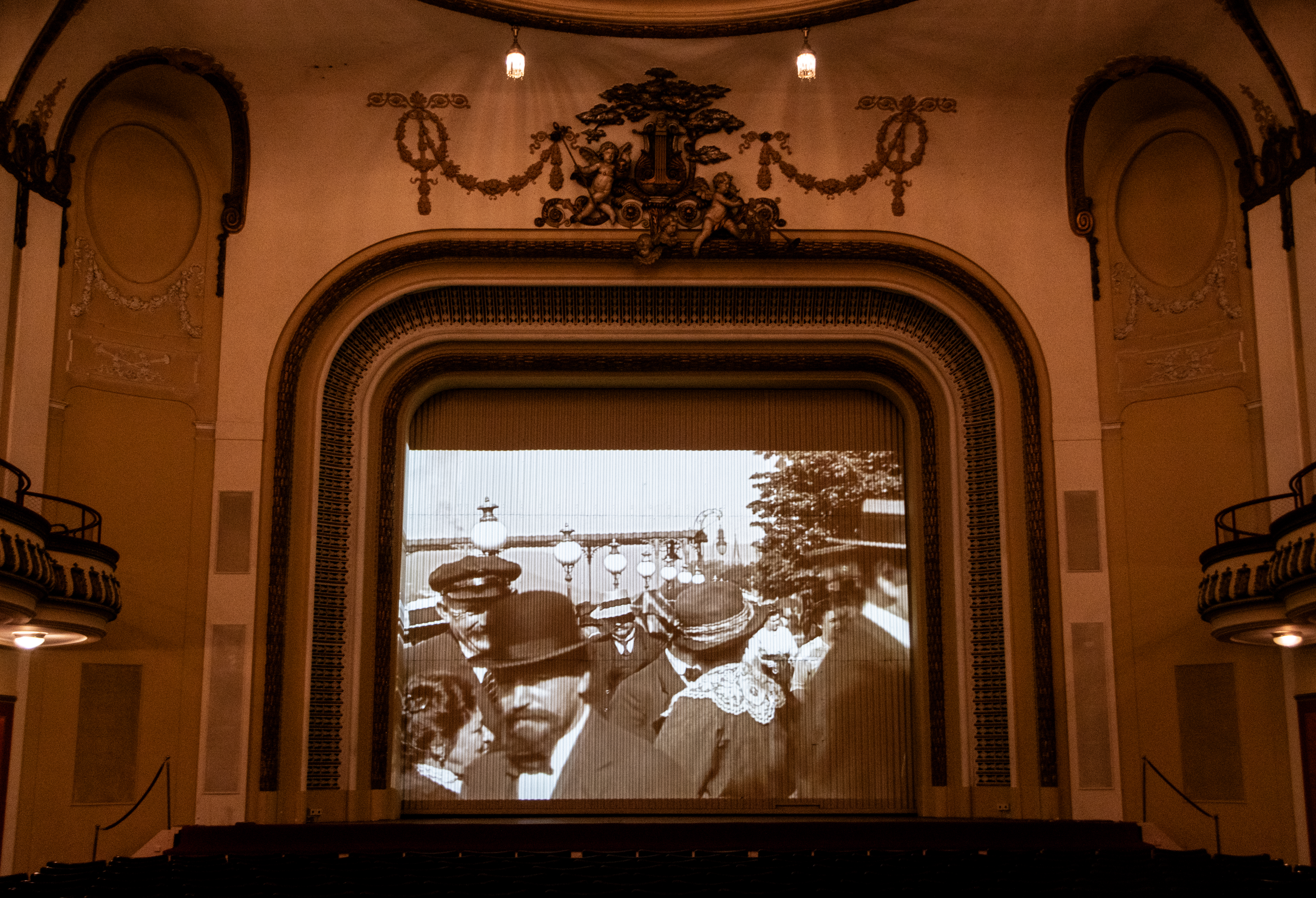
Kurtheater

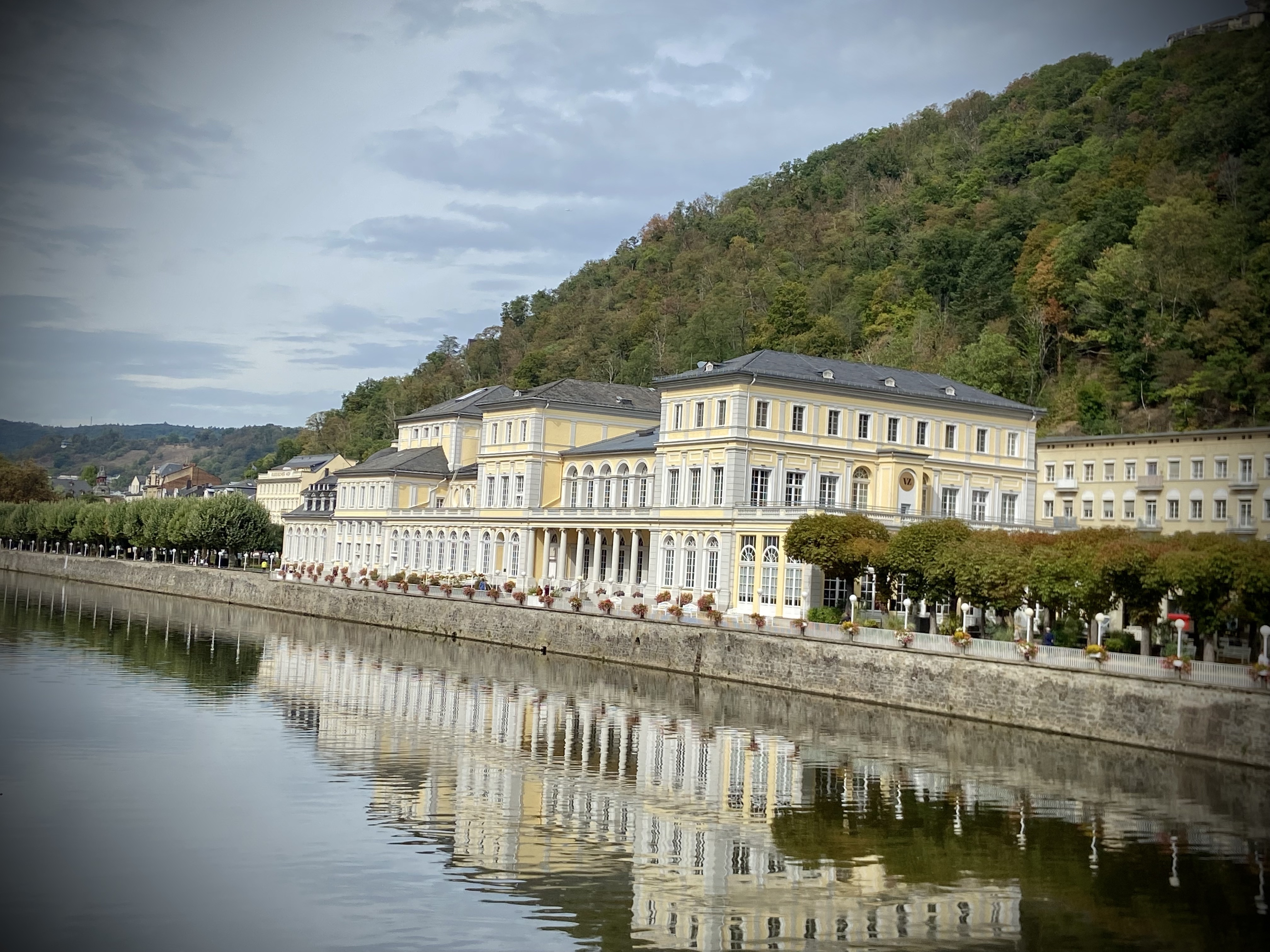
Bad Ems-Cure house (Casino, theater, cultural center with a marble hall)

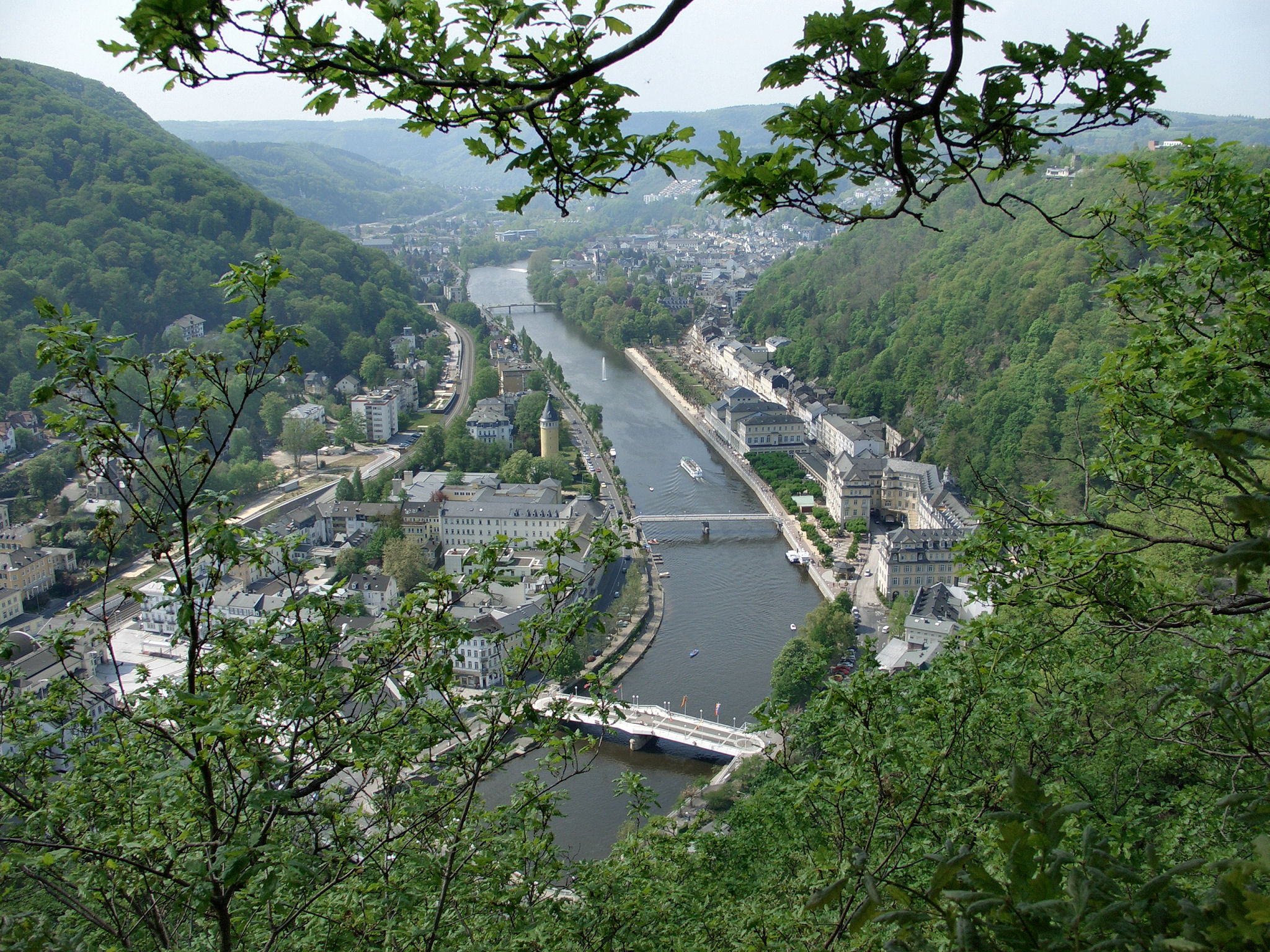
Bad Ems from the Concordia heights

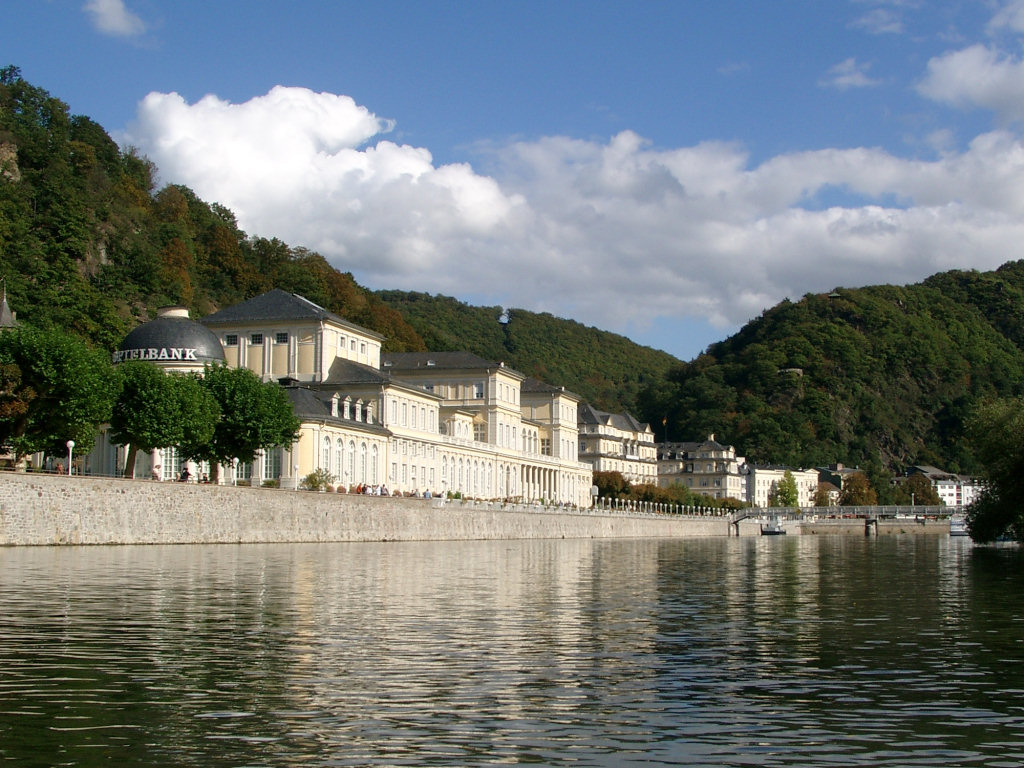
Bad Ems from the River Lahn

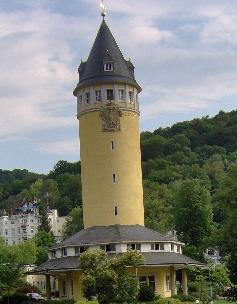
A water tower built in Bad Ems in 1907

== Notable people ==
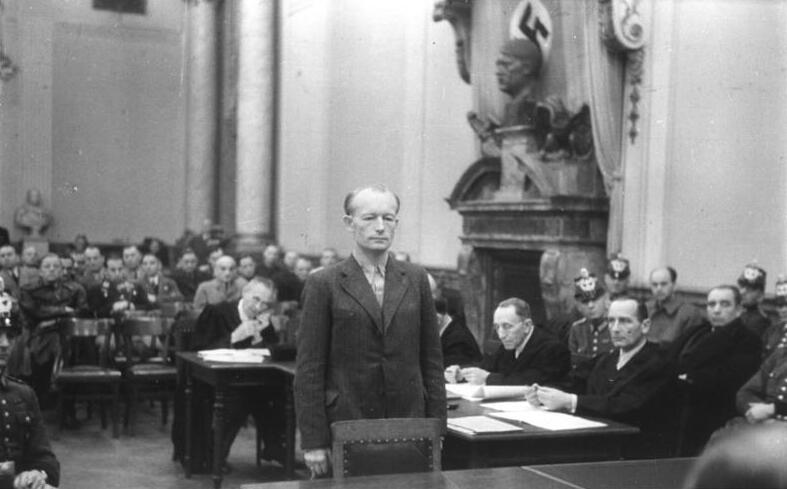
Adolf Reichwein in 1944 (Volksgerichtshof)

=== Sons and daughters ===
- Max Jacob (1888-1967), puppeteer and founder of the Hohnsteiner Puppenbühne
- Adolf Reichwein (1898–1944), educator, economist and cultural politicians, resistance fighter during the Third Reich

=== Personalities associated ===
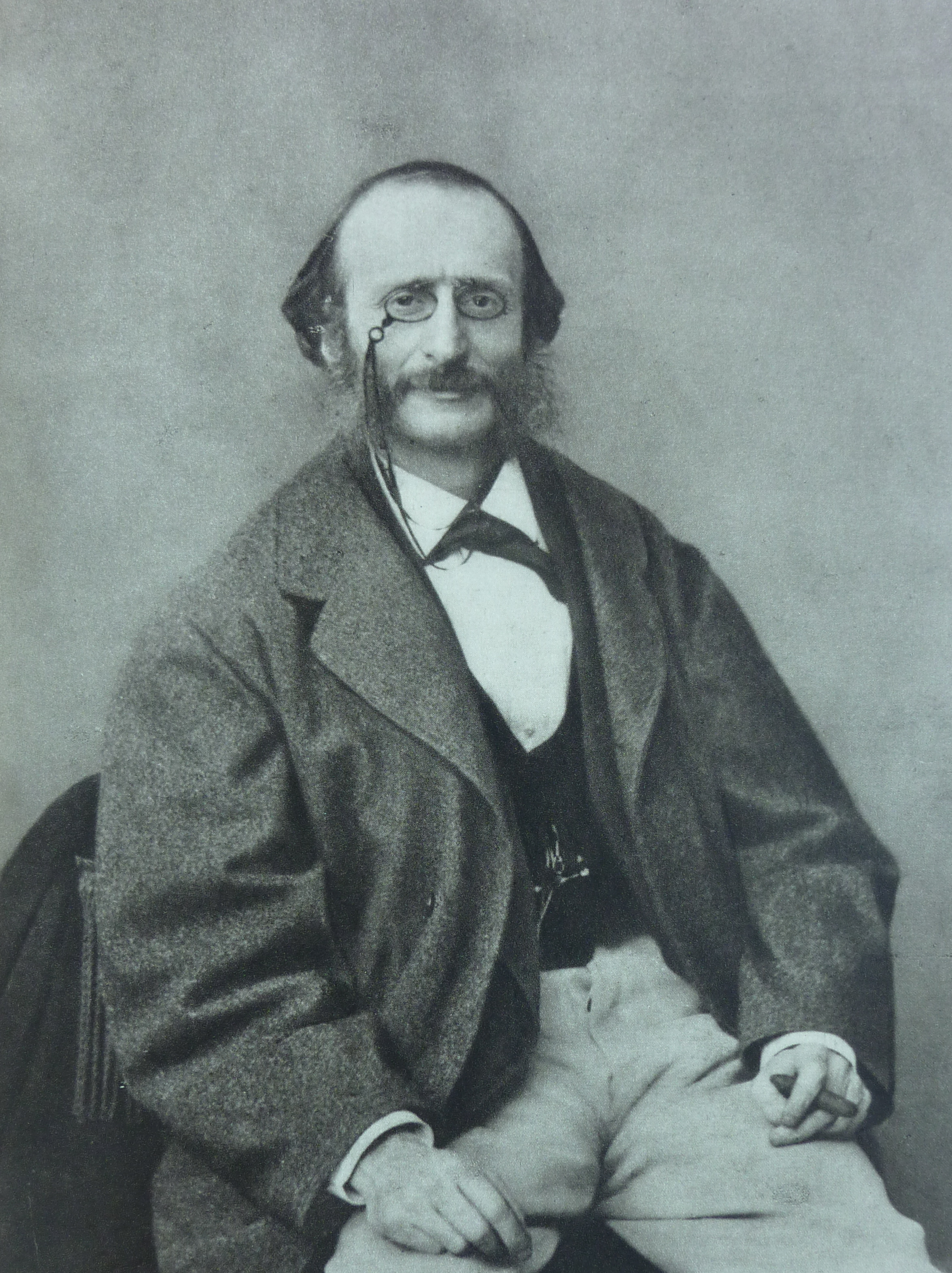
Jacques Offenbach

- Karl Schädler (1804–1872), President of the Landtag of Liechtenstein, born in Bad Ems
- Joseph Derenbourg (1811–1895), orientalist, died in Bad Ems
- Jacques Offenbach (1819–1880), composer, stayed in Bad Ems during the 1860s and premiered several of his operettas in the Kurtheater
- John Naish (1841–1890), Lord Chancellor of Ireland, died in Bad Ems while taking a cure
- Sir William Edward Parry (1790–1855), British Royal Navy officer and explorer, died in Bad Ems while taking a cure
- Botho Strauss (born 1944), writer and playwright, born in Naumburg, schooling in Bad Ems
- Thomas C. Breuer (born 1952), writer and comedian, born in Eisenach, schooling in Bad Ems
- Josef Winkler (born 1974) in Koblenz, former member of parliament (Alliance 90/The Greens), lives in Bad Ems

== Governance ==
=== Mayor ===
The Bürgermeister (mayor) of Bad Ems is Oliver Krügel (CDU).

=== Town twinning ===
Bad Ems is twinned with:

- Droitwich Spa (United Kingdom)
- Lubin (Poland)
- Cosne-Cours-sur-Loire (France)
- Blankenfelde-Mahlow (Germany)
