= Bismarck Tower (Bad Ems) =

Tower in Bad Ems, Germany

Coordinates: 50.333018°N 7.724879°E

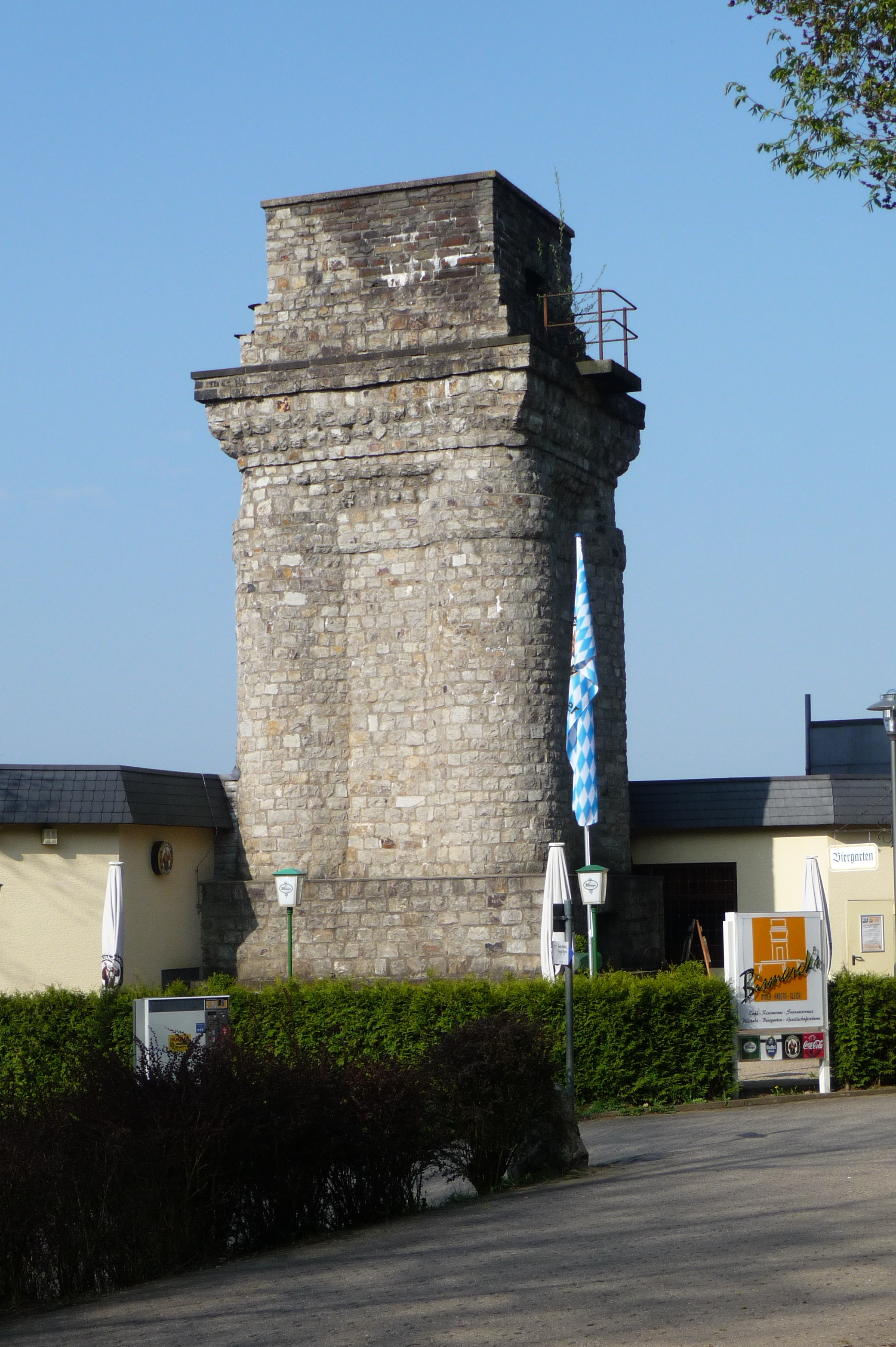
The Bismarckturm of Bad Ems.

The Bismarck Tower of Bad Ems on the Lahn in the Rhein-Lahn-Kreis of Rhineland-Palatinate was built in honour of the first German Chancellor, Prince Otto von Bismarck (1815–1898). Designed by architect Wilhelm Kreis (1873–1955), the tower stands east of the city centre on the Bismarckhöhe, is twelve and a half meters high, and was inaugurated in 1901.

== History ==
=== Planning period ===
After Bismarck's death in 1898, there was a widespread movement in the German Empire to erect monuments in honour of the former chancellor. In Bad Ems—where Otto von Bismarck had been an honorary citizen since 1895—a group of his supporters proposed the construction of a Bismarck Tower in January 1900. Later that same year, it was decided to build the tower on a hill of the mountain Auf dem Klopp, east of the city center, using the model design Götterdämmerung by architect Wilhelm Kreis.

In 1899, Kreis won a competition held by the German Student Association with his design. The association had envisioned a network of so-called "fire columns" across Germany, where large fire bowls would be lit on specific days in honour of Bismarck. The Bismarck Column of the Götterdämmerung model was built more than 40 times throughout the German Empire as a standardized design (Typenbau) until 1911.

The city acquired the building site and provided it free of charge. The construction itself was financed through donations from citizens, spa guests, and the spa commission. The building permit for the tower was granted on June 7, 1900.

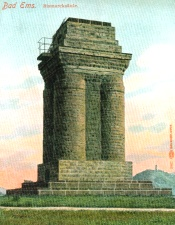
The Bismarck Tower of Bad Ems, as seen from the west side in 1905. The Concordia Tower is visible in the background, situated on the hill to the right.

=== Construction time ===
The foundation stone was laid on June 26, 1900, marking the start of construction. The construction work was not supervised by the architect Wilhelm Kreis himself but was carried out by the Bad Ems building contractor Wilhelm Jacob Balzer. The primary building materials used were quartzite from a nearby quarry near Kemmenau and basalt from a quarry in Niedermendig in the Eastern Eifel.

The construction progressed quickly. By January 1901, the structural work had been officially approved, and by April, the tower was completed. The Bismarck Tower of Bad Ems was ceremonially inaugurated on May 10, 1901. On the evening of the inauguration day, the fire bowl on top of the tower was lit for the first time. A Bismarck coat of arms was mounted on the south side of the tower, facing the slope. The total cost of the structure, including the land, amounted to 11,740 gold marks.

=== First decades ===
On April 1, 1902, a Bismarck Association was founded in Bad Ems to maintain the tower and light the fire bowl on commemorative days. After the inauguration, the fire bowl was regularly lit in the evening on April 1, Bismarck's birthday. However, these commemorative fires were discontinued after only a few years, with the last recorded lighting taking place on April 1, 1913. It is believed that the tradition was not revived after the end of World War I and the occupation of the Rhineland. The Bismarck Tower remained largely unscathed throughout the following decades and World War II.

=== After the Second World War ===
After World War II, the Bismarck Tower of Bad Ems was neglected and eventually stripped of its function as a free-standing monument. In 1977/78, a nearly four-meter-high restaurant building was added to the lower part of the tower, directly against its west and south walls. The modern flat-roof architecture of the addition stands in stark contrast to the historicist style of the tower. The addition also resulted in the destruction of most of the tower's base and its two-tiered pedestal. Furthermore, by the 1980s, the Bismarck coat of arms that had been mounted on the south side of the tower was removed.

In the 1990s, the restaurant was abandoned, the building stood vacant for years, and the Bismarck Tower continued to be neglected. By the end of the 1990s, the tower was in a state that required renovation. In preparation for its centenary, the structure was at least partially repaired. The 100th anniversary of the inauguration of the Bismarck Tower was celebrated with a ceremony in May 2001.

Since 2006, the restaurant at the Bismarck Tower has been in operation again, while the interior of the tower is used as storage space. The tower can no longer be climbed, as the iron rungs originally installed on the walls inside are only partially preserved, and three of the originally present resting platforms have been removed.

== Architecture ==
The Bismarck Tower of Bad Ems has square base walls, and the tower itself is also square. However, the massive appearance is softened by three-quarter columns at the corners of the tower body.

When planning the tower, it was deliberately considered that it would relate to other towers on the surrounding hills of Bad Ems. These include the lookout tower on the Malberg to the southwest of the Bismarck Tower, the reconstruction of a Roman limes tower on the Wintersberg to the south, and the Concordia Tower to the southeast. Therefore, the Bismarck Tower was intentionally built to be representative, with open sightlines in all directions.

With the addition of the restaurant building at the end of the 1970s, the representative character of the tower and its function as a free-standing monument were destroyed. The modern flat-roof architecture of the restaurant stands in stark contrast to the Bismarck Tower, which is a listed monument. Furthermore, the addition resulted in the destruction of most of the tower's base, including its two-tiered pedestal.

=== Platform and base level ===
The Bismarck Tower was originally divided into four parts: The lowest section consisted of a two-tiered, square pedestal, which was a little over one meter high. Each pedestal step was 55 centimeters high, with the lower step having side lengths of 9.5 by 9.5 meters, and the upper one measuring 7.5 by 7.5 meters. On the entrance side to the north, the two pedestal steps were open over a width of about one meter, allowing the tower entrance to be accessed without stairs.

The pedestal was originally the base for the tower's upper Sockelgeschoss (base floor). This section has side lengths of 5.5 by 5.5 meters and a height of almost two meters, with the entrance door on its northern side standing 1.8 meters tall. After the pedestal was largely destroyed during the construction of the restaurant building, the Sockelgeschoss now forms the lowest part of the tower.

=== Tower body and upper floor ===
Above the base floor rises the actual tower body, which is about six meters high. It is slightly recessed compared to the base floor and is rounded at the corners by three-quarter columns. On the south side, facing the slope, a Bismarck coat of arms was originally mounted in the upper part of the tower body.

Above the tower body is the approximately three-meter-high upper floor, consisting of an architrave and a three-tiered superstructure. The upper floor is slightly recessed compared to the tower body. As the upper finishing, a square fire bowl made of cast iron, measuring 2.65 by 2.65 meters, is embedded in the top of the tower. The bowl was made at the nearby Nievern Furnace and is not visible from the outside. The tower has a total height of twelve and a half meters.

=== Staircase system and lighting ===
Inside the Bismarck Tower, it was originally possible to ascend to the top of the tower using ladders, iron rungs attached to the walls, and three resting platforms with cement floors. However, these climbing aids were largely removed, so the tower can no longer be climbed. In the tower's crown, there is still a small lockable iron door that leads to a balcony-like projection, from which an iron ladder still leads to the fire bowl at the top of the tower.

The fire bowl was fuelled, with tar, mineral oil, and fats, as well as wood shavings soaked in petroleum. This fuel was hoisted up inside the tower using a rope winch. The flames reached a height of up to nine meters, and the burning duration lasted up to two hours.

== Other ==
In close proximity to the Bismarck Tower of Bad Ems is the mountain station of the Kurwaldbahn, a funicular railway that was put into operation in 1979.

== See also ==
- Bismarck Tower

== Literature ==
- Günter Kloss, Sieglinde Seele: Bismarck Towers and Bismarck Columns. An Inventory. Michael Imhof Verlag, Petersberg 1997, ISBN 3-932526-10-4
- Sieglinde Seele: Encyclopedia of Bismarck Monuments. Michael Imhof Verlag, Petersberg 2005, ISBN 3-86568-019-4
