= Kurwaldbahn =

Funicular railway in Bad Ems, Germany

Coordinates: 50.3322°N 7.7252°E

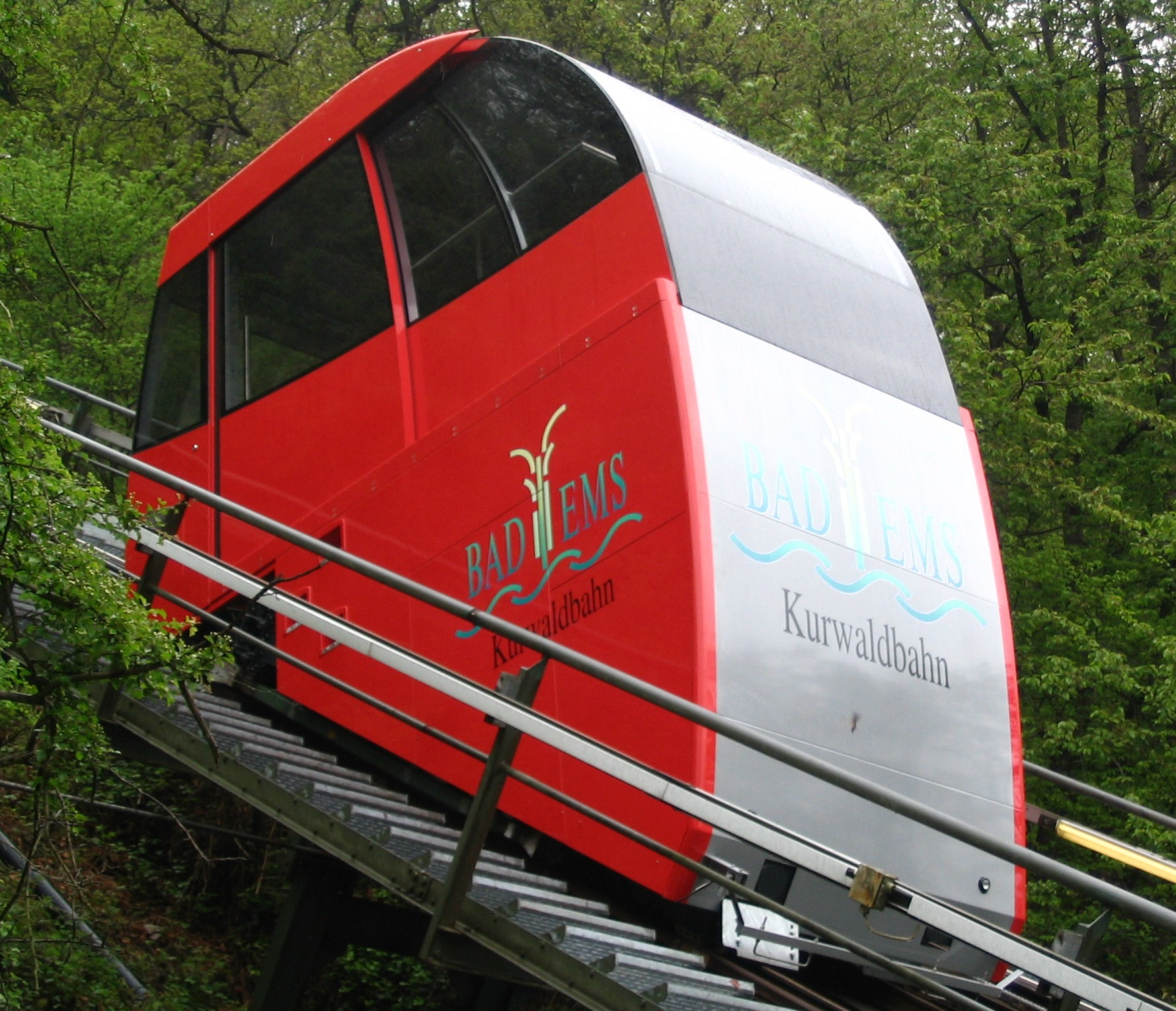
A Kurwaldbahn car

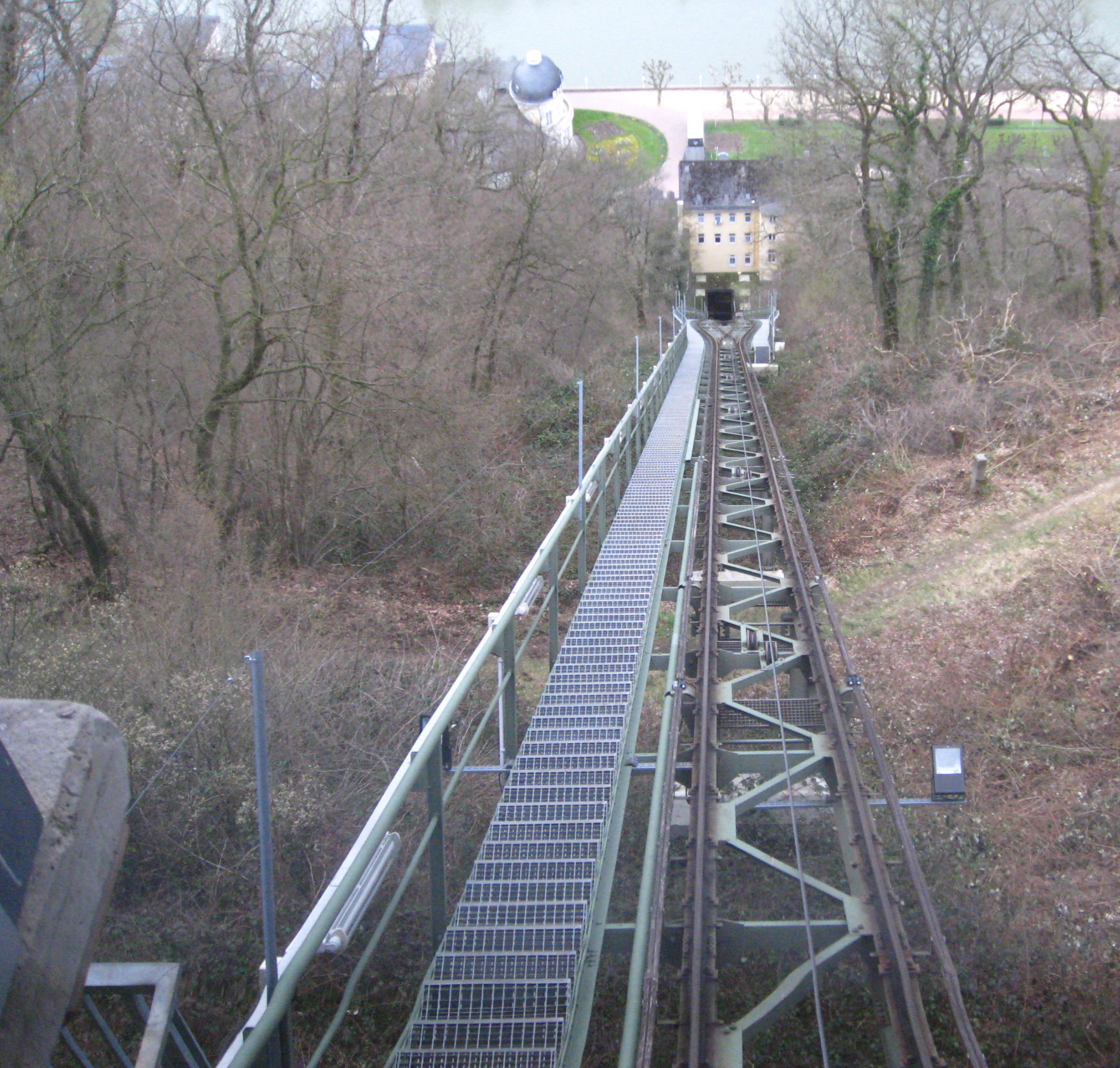
The track

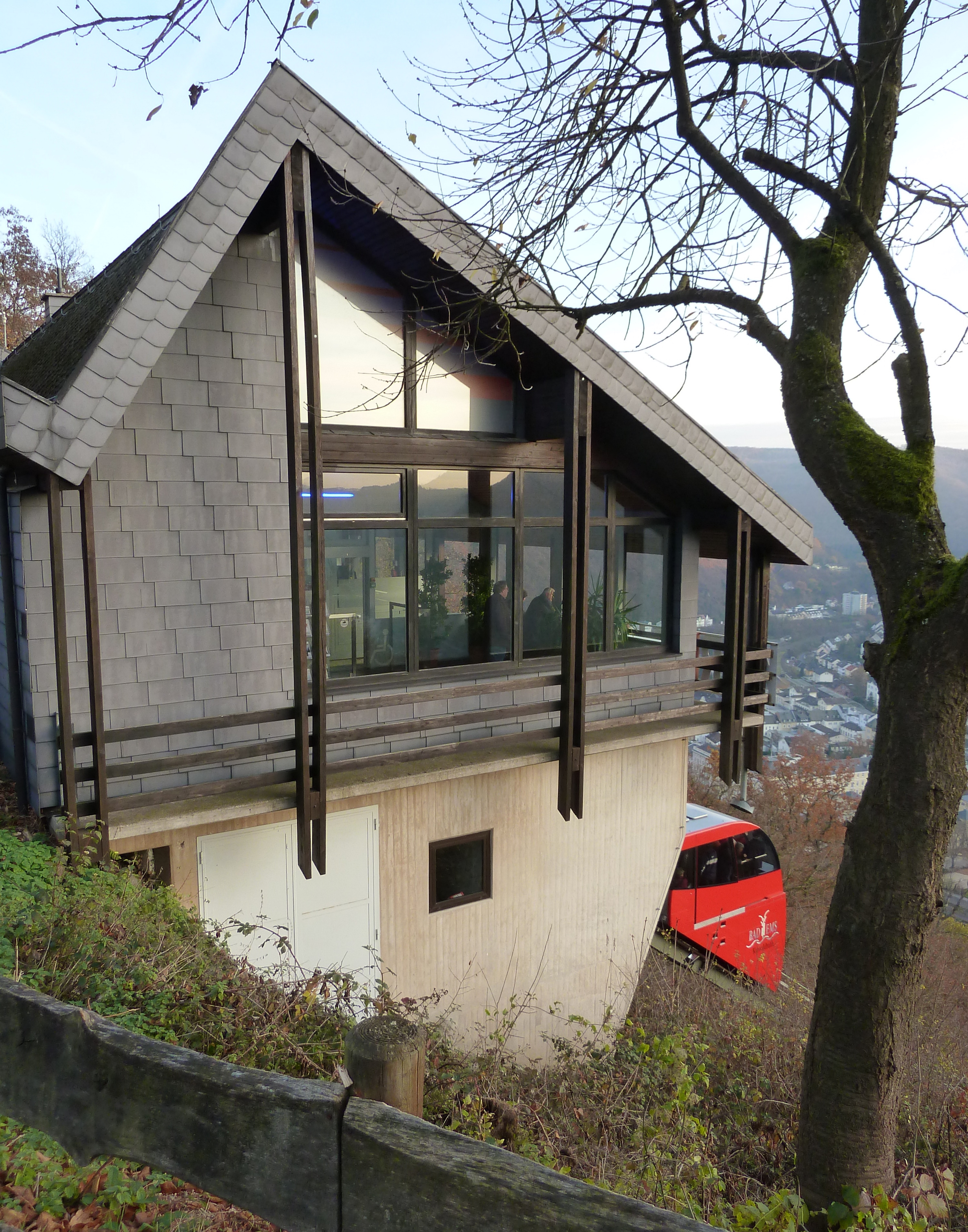
The upper station

The Kurwaldbahn is a funicular railway in the town of Bad Ems in the Rhineland-Palatinate, Germany. It links the city with a view point, complete with a Bismarckturm (Bismarck Tower), and lies opposite the closed Malbergbahn funicular on the other bank of the River Lahn.

The funicular was constructed in 1979 and reconditioned in 2005. It operates daily every few minutes between 06:15 and 22:30.

The funicular has the following technical parameters:

- Length: 220 metres (722 ft)
- Height: 132 metres (433 ft)
- Maximum Steepness: 78%
- Configuration: single track with passing loop
- Cars: 2
- Capacity: 25 passengers per car
- Journey time: 70 seconds
- Track gauge: 1,000 mm (3 ft 3 3/8 in)
- Traction: Electricity

== History ==
The railway, which went into operation in 1979, underwent a major renovation in spring 2005 ahead of the Rhineland-Palatinate Day at a cost of around 1.5 million euros. In the process, the first-generation cars were replaced with new vehicles from the Swiss manufacturer Garaventa (Doppelmayr/Garaventa Group). The valley station is concealed behind the listed façade of a hotel and residential complex. The mountain station is located on the Bismarckhöhe, a spa area with a hotel complex and a Bismarck tower. The colloquial names used by locals for the railway, Asthmarutsche (“asthma slide”) or Röchelexpress (“wheeze express”), allude to the respiratory clinics located at the mountain station.

The railway operates daily every seven minutes between 6:15 a.m. and 8:00 a.m., and every ten minutes from 8:00 a.m. until 10:30 p.m. It is located opposite the Malbergbahn, which was closed in 1979, on the other (northern/right) bank of the Lahn River.

Opposite to the Koblenz-Ehrenbreitstein district - Koblenz-Ehrenbreitstein Fortress funicular, tickets of the transport association Verkehrsverbund Rhein-Mosel (VRM) are also in 2026 still not accepted in the Kurwaldbahn.

== Technology ==
The Kurwald Railway is an electrically powered and fully automatically controlled funicular built according to the Abt system and constructed to metre gauge. The monitoring and control center of the mountain railway, which is usually staffed, is located in the upper station. The line is mounted on a steel structure resting on 21 foundations. Each of the two cars has wheels with double flanges on one side and, opposite them, flangeless rollers, allowing the cars to pass over the tongue-less passing loop (Abt switch).

The track is 220 meters long and overcomes a height difference of 132 meters with a maximum gradient of 78%. The journey time is 70 seconds at a speed of 14 km/h. Each of the two cars can carry a maximum of 25 passengers. Around 100,000 passengers are transported per year.

== See also ==
- List of funicular railways
