= Montabaur (electoral district) =

Federal electoral district of Germany

203 Montabaur
- Electoral district for the Bundestag
- Montabaur in 2025
- State: Rhineland-Palatinate
- Population: 272,800 (2019)
- Electorate: 209,489 (2025)
- Major settlements: Montabaur; Diez an der Lahn; Höhr-Grenzhausen
- Area: 1,508.2 km^{2}

Current electoral district
- Created: 1949
- Party: CDU
- Member: Harald Orthey
- Elected: 2025

Montabaur is an electoral constituency (German: Wahlkreis) represented in the Bundestag. It elects one member via first-past-the-post voting. Under the current constituency numbering system, it is designated as constituency 203. It is located in northern Rhineland-Palatinate, comprising the district of Westerwaldkreis and the eastern part of the Rhein-Lahn-Kreis district.

Montabaur was created for the inaugural 1949 federal election. Since 2025, it has been represented by Harald Orthey of the Christian Democratic Union of Germany (CDU).

== Geography ==
Montabaur is located in northern Rhineland-Palatinate. As of the 2021 federal election, it comprises the district of Westerwaldkreis and, from the district of Rhein-Lahn-Kreis, the Verbandsgemeinden of Aar-Einrich, Diez, and Nastätten, and the municipalities of Attenhausen, Dessighofen, Dienethal, Dornholzhausen, Geisig, Hömberg, Lollschied, Misselberg, Nassau, Obernhof, Oberwies, Pohl, Schweighausen, Seelbach, Singhofen, Sulzbach, Weinähr, Winden, and Zimmerschied from the Bad Ems-Nassau Verbandsgemeinde.

== History ==
Montabaur was created in 1949, then known as Westerburg. It acquired its current name in the 1965 election. In the 1949 election, it was Rhineland-Palatinate constituency 8 in the numbering system. In the 1953 through 1976 elections, it was number 155. In the 1980 through 1998 elections, it was number 153. In the 2002 election, it was number 207. In the 2005 election, it was number 206. In the 2009 and 2013 elections, it was number 205. In the 2017 and 2021 elections, it was number 204. From the 2025 election, it has been number 203.

Originally, the constituency comprised the districts of Oberwesterwaldkreis, Unterwesterwaldkreis, Unterlahnkreis, and St. Goarshausen. While its borders did not change until the 2002 election, a number of administrative changes took place in the following decades: in 1961, the St. Goarshausen district was renamed Loreleykreis; in 1969, the Unterlahnkreis and Loreleykreis districts were merged into the new Rhein-Lahn-Kreis district; and in 1974, the Oberwesterwaldkreis and Unterwesterwaldkreis districts were merged into the new Westerwaldkreis district. The constituency acquired its current borders in the 2002 election.

Election	No.	Name	Borders
1949	8	Westerburg	Westerwaldkreis; Rhein-Lahn-Kreis
1953	155	Westerburg	Westerwaldkreis; Rhein-Lahn-Kreis
1957	155	Westerburg	Westerwaldkreis; Rhein-Lahn-Kreis
1961	155	Westerburg	Westerwaldkreis; Rhein-Lahn-Kreis
1965	155	Montabaur	Westerwaldkreis; Rhein-Lahn-Kreis
1969	155	Montabaur	Westerwaldkreis; Rhein-Lahn-Kreis
1972	155	Montabaur	Westerwaldkreis; Rhein-Lahn-Kreis
1976	155	Montabaur	Westerwaldkreis; Rhein-Lahn-Kreis
1980	153	Montabaur	Westerwaldkreis; Rhein-Lahn-Kreis
1983	153	Montabaur	Westerwaldkreis; Rhein-Lahn-Kreis
1987	153	Montabaur	Westerwaldkreis; Rhein-Lahn-Kreis
1990	153	Montabaur	Westerwaldkreis; Rhein-Lahn-Kreis
1994	153	Montabaur	Westerwaldkreis; Rhein-Lahn-Kreis
1998	153	Montabaur	Westerwaldkreis; Rhein-Lahn-Kreis
2002	207	Montabaur	Westerwaldkreis; Rhein-Lahn-Kreis (only Aar-Einrich, Diez, Nastätten, and Bad Ems-Nassau (only Attenhausen, Dessighofen, Dienethal, Dornholzhausen, Geisig, Hömberg, Lollschied, Misselberg, Nassau, Obernhof, Oberwies, Pohl, Schweighausen, Seelbach, Singhofen, Sulzbach, Weinähr, Winden, and Zimmerschied municipalities) Verbandsgemeinden)
2005	206	Montabaur	Westerwaldkreis; Rhein-Lahn-Kreis (only Aar-Einrich, Diez, Nastätten, and Bad Ems-Nassau (only Attenhausen, Dessighofen, Dienethal, Dornholzhausen, Geisig, Hömberg, Lollschied, Misselberg, Nassau, Obernhof, Oberwies, Pohl, Schweighausen, Seelbach, Singhofen, Sulzbach, Weinähr, Winden, and Zimmerschied municipalities) Verbandsgemeinden)
2009	205	Montabaur	Westerwaldkreis; Rhein-Lahn-Kreis (only Aar-Einrich, Diez, Nastätten, and Bad Ems-Nassau (only Attenhausen, Dessighofen, Dienethal, Dornholzhausen, Geisig, Hömberg, Lollschied, Misselberg, Nassau, Obernhof, Oberwies, Pohl, Schweighausen, Seelbach, Singhofen, Sulzbach, Weinähr, Winden, and Zimmerschied municipalities) Verbandsgemeinden)
2013	205	Montabaur	Westerwaldkreis; Rhein-Lahn-Kreis (only Aar-Einrich, Diez, Nastätten, and Bad Ems-Nassau (only Attenhausen, Dessighofen, Dienethal, Dornholzhausen, Geisig, Hömberg, Lollschied, Misselberg, Nassau, Obernhof, Oberwies, Pohl, Schweighausen, Seelbach, Singhofen, Sulzbach, Weinähr, Winden, and Zimmerschied municipalities) Verbandsgemeinden)
2017	204	Montabaur	Westerwaldkreis; Rhein-Lahn-Kreis (only Aar-Einrich, Diez, Nastätten, and Bad Ems-Nassau (only Attenhausen, Dessighofen, Dienethal, Dornholzhausen, Geisig, Hömberg, Lollschied, Misselberg, Nassau, Obernhof, Oberwies, Pohl, Schweighausen, Seelbach, Singhofen, Sulzbach, Weinähr, Winden, and Zimmerschied municipalities) Verbandsgemeinden)
2021	204	Montabaur	Westerwaldkreis; Rhein-Lahn-Kreis (only Aar-Einrich, Diez, Nastätten, and Bad Ems-Nassau (only Attenhausen, Dessighofen, Dienethal, Dornholzhausen, Geisig, Hömberg, Lollschied, Misselberg, Nassau, Obernhof, Oberwies, Pohl, Schweighausen, Seelbach, Singhofen, Sulzbach, Weinähr, Winden, and Zimmerschied municipalities) Verbandsgemeinden)
2025	203	Montabaur	Westerwaldkreis; Rhein-Lahn-Kreis (only Aar-Einrich, Diez, Nastätten, and Bad Ems-Nassau (only Attenhausen, Dessighofen, Dienethal, Dornholzhausen, Geisig, Hömberg, Lollschied, Misselberg, Nassau, Obernhof, Oberwies, Pohl, Schweighausen, Seelbach, Singhofen, Sulzbach, Weinähr, Winden, and Zimmerschied municipalities) Verbandsgemeinden)

== Members ==
The constituency has been held by the Christian Democratic Union (CDU) during all but two Bundestag terms since its creation. It was first represented by Robert Stauch of the CDU from 1949 to 1965, followed by August Hanz until 1972. Willi Peiter of the Social Democratic Party (SPD) was elected in 1972 and served a single term. Former member Hanz regained it in 1976 and served until 1987. Joachim Hörster was then representative from 1987 to 1998. Rudolf Scharping of the SPD was elected in 1998 and served a single term. Former member Hörster regained it in 2002 and served until 2013. Andreas Nick was elected 2013 and re-elected in 2017. Tanja Machalet won the constituency for the SPD in 2021, but lost to Harald Orthey of the CDU in 2025.

Election	Member	Party	%
1949	Robert Stauch	CDU	53.7
1953	Robert Stauch	CDU	54.1
1957	Robert Stauch	CDU	55.5
1961	Robert Stauch	CDU	48.8
1965	August Hanz	CDU	51.2
1969	August Hanz	CDU	49.8
1972	Willi Peiter	SPD	48.0
1976	August Hanz	CDU	49.3
1980	August Hanz	CDU	46.0
1983	August Hanz	CDU	52.9
1987	Joachim Hörster	CDU	48.3
1990	Joachim Hörster	CDU	48.0
1994	Joachim Hörster	CDU	47.0
1998	Rudolf Scharping	SPD	47.2
2002	Joachim Hörster	CDU	45.9
2005	Joachim Hörster	CDU	46.6
2009	Joachim Hörster	CDU	43.2
2013	Andreas Nick	CDU	49.4
2017	Andreas Nick	CDU	43.3
2021	Tanja Machalet	SPD	31.5
2025	Harald Orthey	CDU	35.7

== Election results ==
=== 2025 election ===
Federal election (2025): Montabaur
Notes:	Blue background denotes the winner of the electorate vote. Pink background denotes a candidate elected from their party list. Yellow background denotes an electorate win by a list member, or other incumbent. A ✓ or ✗ denotes status of any incumbent, win or lose respectively.						
Party	Candidate	Votes	%	±%	Party votes	%	±%
CDU	Harald Orthey	61,540	35.7	▲5.7	56,164	32.5	▲6.0
AfD	Clara Alexander	35,333	20.5	▲11.8	36,388	21.0	▲12.1
SPD	✗ Tanja Machalet	40,265	23.4	▼8.1	31,353	18.1	▼12.2
Greens	Yannik Maaß	10,840	6.3	▼2.5	14,638	8.5	▼1.9
Left	Alina Ehard	8,708	5.1	▲2.3	10,315	6.0	▲3.1
FDP	Pierre Fuchs	5,479	3.2	▼6.1	7,959	4.6	▼7.1
BSW					7,330	4.2	New
FW	Heiko Murrmann	5,941	3.4	▼2.1	3,791	2.2	▼1.8
Tierschutzpartei	Michaela Rutte	4,208	2.4	New	2,467	1.4	▼0.1
Volt					1,150	0.7	▲0.4
PARTEI					823	0.5	▼0.5
BD					300	0.2	New
ÖDP					214	0.1	0.0
MLPD					30	<0.1	0.0
Informal votes		2,185			1,577		
Total valid votes		172,314			172,922		
Turnout		174,499	83.3	▲5.4			
CDU gain from SPD	Majority	21,275	12.3	N/A			

=== 2021 election ===
Federal election (2021): Montabaur
Notes:	Blue background denotes the winner of the electorate vote. Pink background denotes a candidate elected from their party list. Yellow background denotes an electorate win by a list member, or other incumbent. A ✓ or ✗ denotes status of any incumbent, win or lose respectively.						
Party	Candidate	Votes	%	±%	Party votes	%	±%
SPD	Tanja Machalet	50,975	31.5	▲1.7	49,346	30.3	▲5.7
CDU	✗ Andreas Nick	48,607	30.0	▼13.3	43,125	26.5	▼11.0
FDP	Dennis Sturm	15,101	9.3	▲0.2	19,021	11.7	▲0.7
Greens	Torsten Klein	14,276	8.8	▲3.6	16,832	10.3	▲4.1
AfD	Robin Classen	14,090	8.7		14,565	9.0	▼2.1
FW	Sascha Kraft	8,954	5.5	0.0	6,432	4.0	▲2.4
Left	Natalie Brosch	4,483	2.8	▼4.2	4,690	2.9	▼3.0
Tierschutzpartei					2,424	1.5	
PARTEI	Claudia Boas	2,887	1.8		1,657	1.0	▲0.1
dieBasis	Jens-Christian Steuler	2,384	1.5		2,100	1.3	
Pirates					588	0.4	▼0.1
Team Todenhöfer					539	0.3	
Volt					504	0.3	
Independent	Wotan Engels	336	0.2				
ÖDP					223	0.1	0.0
NPD					193	0.1	▼0.1
V-Partei3					139	0.1	▼0.2
Humanists					138	0.1	
DiB					104	0.1	
LKR					67	0.0	
MLPD					24	0.0	0.0
Informal votes		2,172			1,454		
Total valid votes		161,993			162,711		
Turnout		164,165	77.9	0.0			
SPD gain from CDU	Majority	2,368	1.5				

=== 2017 election ===
Federal election (2017): Montabaur
Notes:	Blue background denotes the winner of the electorate vote. Pink background denotes a candidate elected from their party list. Yellow background denotes an electorate win by a list member, or other incumbent. A ✓ or ✗ denotes status of any incumbent, win or lose respectively.						
Party	Candidate	Votes	%	±%	Party votes	%	±%
CDU	✓ Andreas Nick	68,727	43.3	▼6.0	60,594	37.5	▼7.8
SPD	Gabi Weber	47,312	29.8	▼1.2	39,906	24.7	▼3.1
AfD					17,826	11.0	▲5.9
FDP	Thorsten Hehl	14,543	9.2	▲6.7	17,703	10.9	▲5.7
Left	Martin Klein	11,098	7.0	▲2.2	9,576	5.9	▲0.9
FW	Astrid Bergmann-Hartl	8,792	5.5	▲3.0	2,445	1.5	▲0.2
Greens	Michael Musil	8,225	5.2	▼0.8	10,058	6.2	▼0.1
PARTEI					1,500	0.9	
Pirates					688	0.4	▼1.6
V-Partei³					425	0.3	
NPD					421	0.3	▼0.9
BGE					308	0.2	
ÖDP					275	0.2	0.0
MLPD					34	0.0	0.0
Informal votes		4,823			1,761		
Total valid votes		158,697			161,759		
Turnout		163,520	77.8	▲4.3			
CDU hold	Majority	21,415	13.5	▼4.9			

=== 2013 election ===
Federal election (2013): Montabaur
Notes:	Blue background denotes the winner of the electorate vote. Pink background denotes a candidate elected from their party list. Yellow background denotes an electorate win by a list member, or other incumbent. A ✓ or ✗ denotes status of any incumbent, win or lose respectively.						
Party	Candidate	Votes	%	±%	Party votes	%	±%
CDU	Andreas Nick	74,887	49.3	▲6.2	69,119	45.2	▲10.2
SPD	Gabi Weber	47,097	31.0	▲1.6	42,500	27.8	▲4.0
Greens	Andrea Weber	9,014	5.9	▼1.1	9,646	6.3	▼2.3
Left	Martin Klein	7,217	4.8	▼3.1	7,724	5.1	▼3.6
FW	Armin Hillingshäuser	3,796	2.5		1,945	1.3	
FDP	Kai Mifka	3,714	2.4	▼8.5	7,994	5.2	▼13.3
AfD					7,831	5.1	
Pirates	Maik Nauheim	3,707	2.4		3,104	2.0	▲0.1
NPD	Marcel Müller	2,341	1.5	0.0	1,705	1.1	▼0.1
Party of Reason					316	0.2	
PRO					300	0.2	
ÖDP					291	0.2	0.0
REP					279	0.2	▼0.2
MLPD					77	0.1	0.0
Informal votes		3,327			2,269		
Total valid votes		151,773			152,831		
Turnout		155,100	73.5	▲1.1			
CDU hold	Majority	27,790	18.3	▲4.5			

=== 2009 election ===
Federal election (2009): Montabaur
Notes:	Blue background denotes the winner of the electorate vote. Pink background denotes a candidate elected from their party list. Yellow background denotes an electorate win by a list member, or other incumbent. A ✓ or ✗ denotes status of any incumbent, win or lose respectively.						
Party	Candidate	Votes	%	±%	Party votes	%	±%
CDU	✓ Joachim Hörster	65,215	43.2	▼3.4	53,078	35.0	▼3.5
SPD	Björn Walden	44,416	29.4	▼8.9	36,122	23.8	▼10.0
FDP	Thomas Bläsche	16,541	10.9	▲6.4	28,104	18.5	▲6.1
Left	Martin Klein	11,884	7.9	▲3.5	13,186	8.7	▲3.6
Greens	Michael Musil	10,685	7.1	▲3.3	13,047	8.6	▲1.9
Pirates					2,948	1.9	
NPD	Christian Greeb	2,347	1.6	0.0	1,895	1.2	▼0.1
FAMILIE					1,627	1.1	▲0.1
REP					638	0.4	▼0.1
PBC					540	0.4	▼0.2
ÖDP					311	0.2	
DVU					118	0.1	
MLPD					31	0.0	0.0
Informal votes		3,255			2,698		
Total valid votes		151,088			151,645		
Turnout		154,343	72.4	▼6.6			
CDU hold	Majority	20,799	13.8	▲5.5			

=== 2005 election ===
Federal election (2005):Montabaur
Notes:	Blue background denotes the winner of the electorate vote. Pink background denotes a candidate elected from their party list. Yellow background denotes an electorate win by a list member, or other incumbent. A ✓ or ✗ denotes status of any incumbent, win or lose respectively.						
Party	Candidate	Votes	%	±%	Party votes	%	±%
CDU	✓ Joachim Hörster	76,418	46.6	▲0.7	63,326	38.5	▼3.6
SPD	Björn Walden	62,825	38.3	▼0.1	55,571	33.8	▼4.4
FDP	Herbert Pechmann	7,497	4.6	▼3.1	20,437	12.4	▲3.2
Left	Martin Klein	7,094	4.3	▲3.1	8,303	5.1	▲4.1
Greens	Fred Keßler	6,245	3.8	▼2.2	10,964	6.7	▲0.1
NPD	Christian Steup	2,486	1.5		2,151	1.3	▲0.9
PBC	Michael Kien	1,381	0.8	0.0	959	0.6	▲0.1
Familie					1,573	1.0	
REP					908	0.6	0.0
MLPD					88	0.1	
Informal votes		3,727			3,393		
Total valid votes		163,946			164,280		
Turnout		167,673	78.9	▼1.8			
CDU hold	Majority	13,593	8.3				
