= Nassau (Verbandsgemeinde) =

Municipality in Rhineland-Palatinate, Germany

Coordinates: 50.317°N 7.800°E

Nassau is a former Verbandsgemeinde ("collective municipality") in the Rhein-Lahn-Kreis, in Rhineland-Palatinate, Germany. In January 2019, it was merged into the new Verbandsgemeinde Bad Ems-Nassau. Its seat was in Nassau.

The Verbandsgemeinde Nassau consisted of the following Ortsgemeinden ("local municipalities"):

1. Attenhausen
2. Dessighofen
3. Dienethal
4. Dornholzhausen
5. Geisig
6. Hömberg
7. Lollschied
8. Misselberg
9. Nassau
10. Obernhof
11. Oberwies
12. Pohl
13. Schweighausen
14. Seelbach
15. Singhofen
16. Sulzbach
17. Weinähr
18. Winden
19. Zimmerschied
