= Nassau (region) =

Historical region in Germany

Flag of the Duchy of Nassau, a German state existing from 1806 until 1866

Arms of the house of Nassau and used by its states: Azure, billetty a lion rampant with a closed crown Or, armed and langued gules.

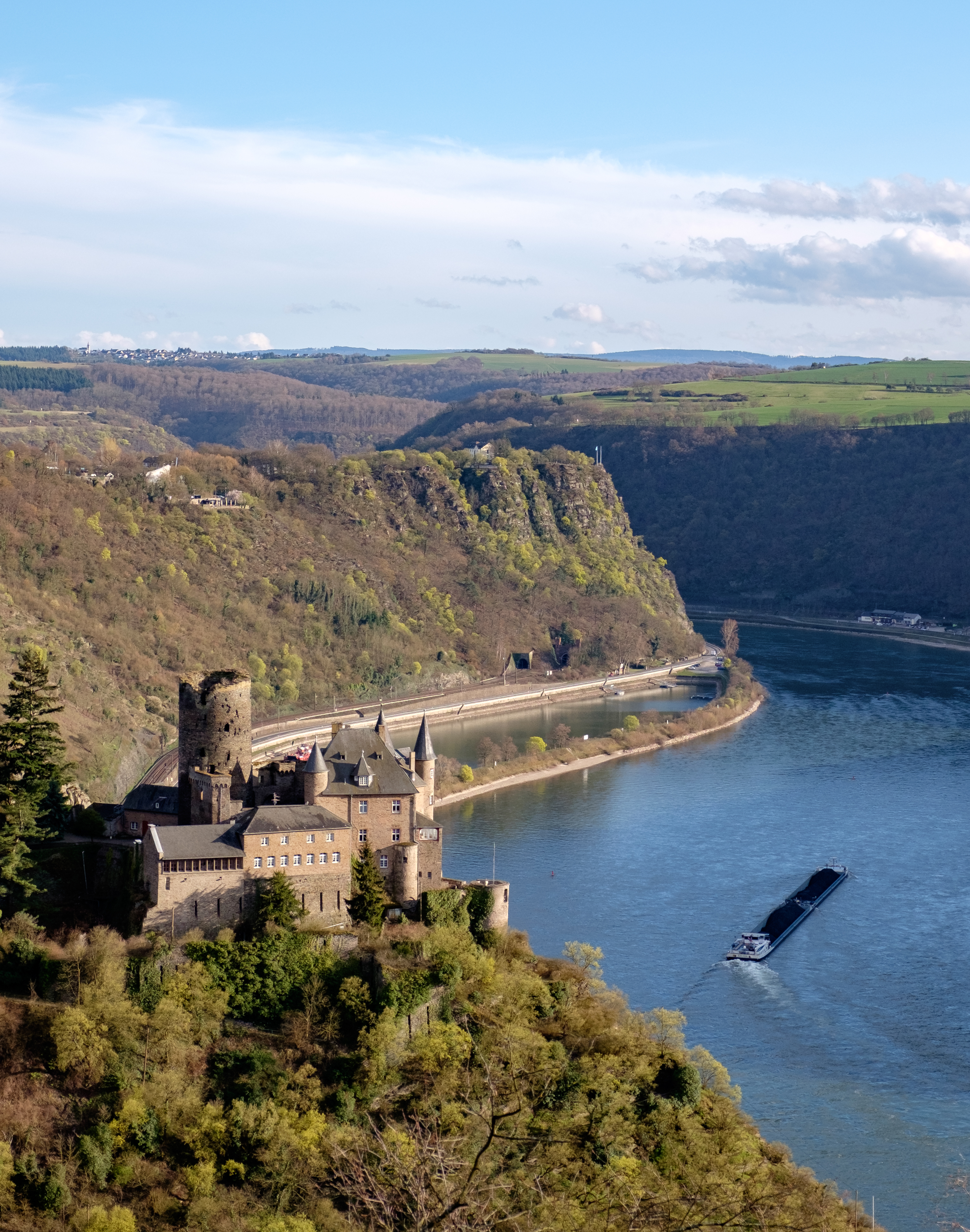
St. Goarshausen, with Katz Castle and the Loreley rock

Nassau (/ˈnæsɔː/ NASS-aw, also UK: /ˈnæsaʊ/ NASS-ow, US: /ˈnɑːsaʊ/ NAHSS-ow, German: [ˈnasaʊ]) is a geographical, historical and cultural region in today's Rhineland-Palatinate, Hesse and North Rhine-Westphalia in western and northern Germany. Named after the Nassau Castle, itself named after the town of Nassau, it consists of the territories of the historical Nassau state, in the forms of the County and Duchy of Nassau. The independence of the state, as the Duchy, ended with the occupation by Prussia and was annexed into the Province of Hesse-Nassau in 1866, Nassau briefly became a "province" of Prussia (as de facto these were abolished by the new 1934 territorial subdivisions), after the separation of the former as the Province of Nassau, in 1944. Much of the area is today part of the Nassau Nature Park. Nassau is also the name of the smaller Nassau collective municipality, the area surrounding the town of Nassau, which has been merged into Bad Ems-Nassau collective municipality.

== Overview ==
Nassau is located on the German-Dutch Orange Route, which is the route named for historical reasons. During the County days, a strategic marriage resulted in the family gaining vast estates in the Low Countries which will result in the Dutch Revolt. Descendants of the revolt's leader William the Silent and his brother inherited the role of stadtholder within the Dutch Republic, with the line retaining their countly titles. After the death of Willam III, the new line had titles of princes as this new line had its different countly title promoted to princely and adopted a new princely title as they inherrited this position. Alongside the new status as kings, Willam I gained the newly promoted Grand Duchy of Luxembourg while the County got promoted to a Duchy in 1806 with the establishment of the Confederation of the Rhine and they turned against Napoleon when the war shifted against his favor. They kept the ducal status after the war and lost their sovereignty in 1866. In 1890, after the death of the Dutch male line, the line which held the Duchy inherrited Luxembourg and their titles included the new title of grand dukes alongside their old ducal titles.

The Nassau cultural identity can be seen in the name of the regional newspaper Nassauische Neue Presse and the savings bank Nassauische Sparkasse.

The names of the Nassau County, Florida, Nassau County, New York, Nassau, Bahamas and many others were named after other things named Nassau which all directly or indirectly were named after the region.

== Cities and towns ==
The most important cities and towns of the Nassau region are:

- Nassau
- Braubach
- Nastätten
- St. Goarshausen
- Schwalbach
- Wehen
- Idstein
- Wiesbaden
- Eltville
- Rüdesheim
- Höchst
- Königstein
- Usingen
- Weilburg
- Diez
- Limburg
- Hadamar
- Montabaur
- Westerburg
- Rennerod
- Marienberg
- Hachenburg
- Herborn
- Dillenburg
- Freudenberg
- Hilchenbach
- Kreuztal
- Siegen
- Wilnsdorf

== Literature ==
- Herzogtum Nassau 1806–1866. Politik – Wirtschaft – Kultur, Historische Kommission für Nassau, Wiesbaden 1981, ISBN 3-922244-46-7
