= Vugar Aslanov =

Azerbaijani writer and journalist

- Aslanov in 2015
- Born: 1964 (age 61–62); Goranboy, Azerbaijan
- Education: Baku State University
- Occupations: Writer, journalist
- Writing career
- Language: Azerbaijani, Russian, German

Vugar Aslanov (born Goranboy, Azerbaijan) is a writer and journalist from Azerbaijan. In college he studied literature. By the 1990s he was working in Baku for various newspapers. He and the information agency Səmt (Drift) founded the newspaper, Kompas, which he ran from 1995 to 1998. During that time he edited a book of short stories and also wrote short stories. Many of his stories were published by the writers union of Azerbaijan in its literary magazines. He emigrated from Azerbaijan in 1998 to Germany. In Germany he was able to continue his journalistic and literary work. He lectured and wrote about the various republics in the former Soviet Union. In 2007 he wrote a book in German called The Cotton Fields. The Cotton Fields is a volume of seven of his short stories on aspects of life.

== Life ==
Aslanov studied literature at Baku State University in the capital of Azerbaijan from 1982 to 1983 and from 1985 to 1990. In the Interim he was a soldier in the Soviet Army. After graduating, he worked in a laboratory on rock samples. Starting in 1990, Aslanov worked for newspapers such as Tereggi-Tetis, Addym, Wyschka, and Jol in Baku, Azerbaijan. In 1995, he started the literary newspaper Kompas.

== Career ==
=== 1990s ===
In 1997, he published his first book, The Milkman, and in 1999 in Baku, he published a second book, An American Spy in Azerbaijan. In 1998, he emigrated to Germany to continue his literary and journalistic activities.

His articles were published in newspapers including Frankfurter Neue Presse, Frankfurter Rundschau, Salzburger Nachrichten, taz, and Thüringer Allgemeine. He volunteered at the local paper, Nassauische Neue Presse, where he wrote articles about the problems of immigration and integration. In addition, he lectured on the economic and political situation in Azerbaijan, the Caucasus, Central Asia, and Russia.

=== 2000s-present ===
In 2007, the Berlin publishing house Wostok published Aslanov's book On The Cotton Fields. Aslanov received a grant from Filmpromotion of Hessen for his scenario "Dianas Bediener" (together with Felix Lenz). The Delayed Column, another work by Aslanov, was published by Wostok in 2012. Currently, Aslanov is a member of the Union of German Writers and the Literary Society of Hessen.
