= Tanja Machalet =

German politician

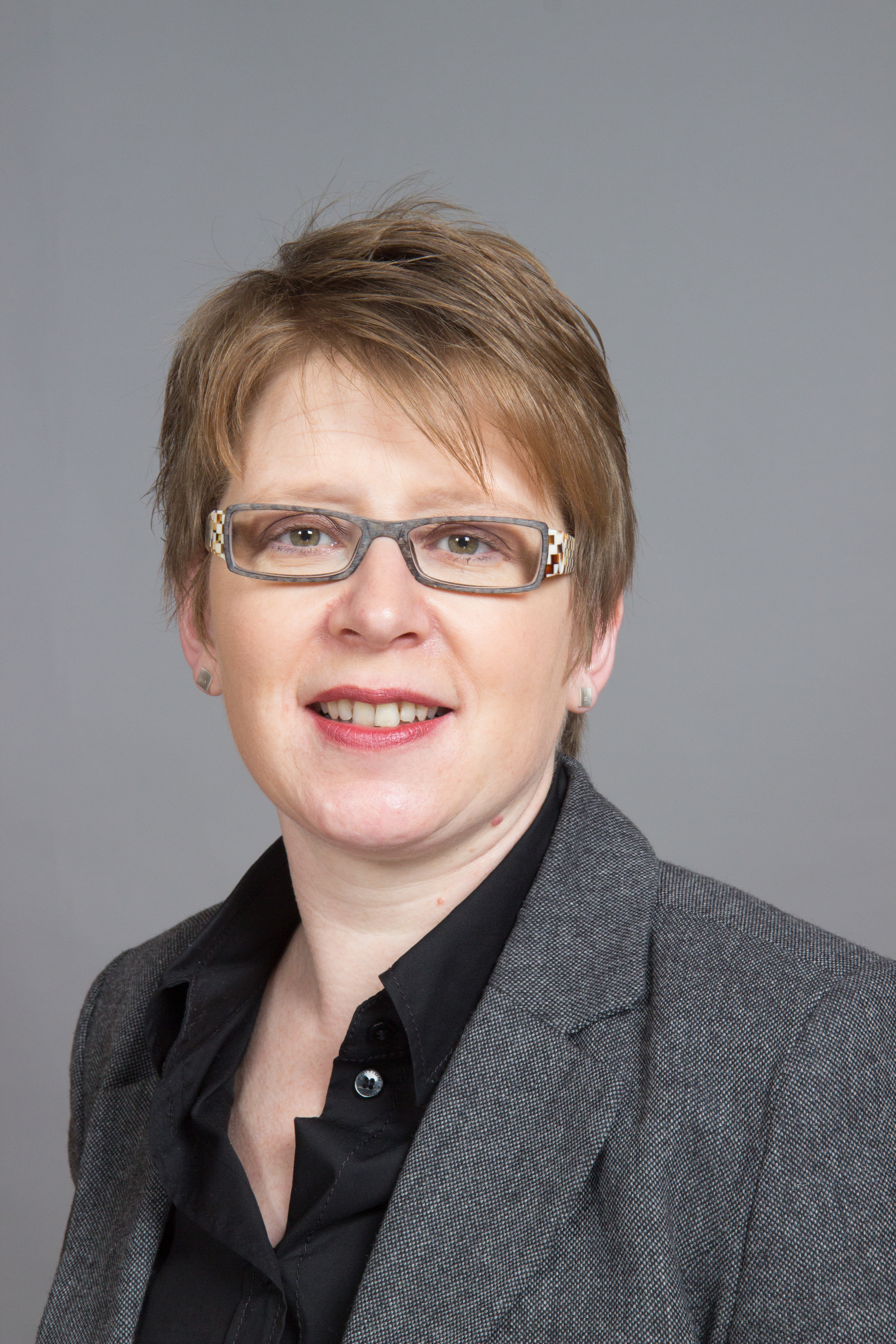
- Tanja Machalet (2014)

Member of the Bundestag
- In office October 2021 – 2025
- Preceded by: Andreas Nick
- Succeeded by: Harald Orthey
- Constituency: Montabaur

Personal details
- Born: 1 May 1974 (age 51)
- Party: SPD

Tanja Machalet (née Breuer, born 1 May 1974) is a German politician of the Social Democratic Party (SPD). Machalet became a member of the Bundestag in the 2021 German federal election and she represented the constituency of Montabaur.

== Political career ==
=== Career in state politics ===
Machalet was deputy federal chairman of the Jusos from 1999 to 2003, of which she had been a member since 1991. In 2009, she was the SPD's candidate for district administrator in the Westerwald district, but lost to Achim Schwickert of the CDU. In 2011 and 2016, Machalet ran for the Rhineland-Palatinate state parliament in the electoral district of Montabaur and entered the state parliament for the SPD on the state list in both cases. In the legislative period from 2016, she was a member of the Budget and Finance Committee, the Committee for Social Affairs and Labor, and the Committee for Health, Care and Demography. She was also the budget policy spokesperson for the SPD parliamentary group.

Machalet is a member of the municipal council of the Wallmerod municipality and the district council of the Westerwald district.

In March 2020, Machalet announced that she would not run again in the election for the 18th state parliament of Rhineland-Palatinate. The district executive of the SPD in the Westerwaldkreis nominated Machalet to succeed Gabi Weber in the Bundestag constituency of Montabaur for the election to the 20th German Bundestag. On March 20, 2021, she was elected by the relevant delegate conference as the SPD direct candidate in the Bundestag constituency of Montabaur.

=== Member of the German Parliament, 2021–present ===
In the 2021 elections, Machalet was elected to the German Bundestag as a direct candidate in the Montabaur constituency. Since the 2025 elections, she has been chairing the parliament's Committee on Health.

Within her parliamentary group, Machalet belongs to the Parliamentary Left, a left-wing movement.
