= Seelbach =

Seelbach may refer to the following places in Germany:

- Seelbach, Baden-Württemberg
- Seelbach, Rhein-Lahn, in the Rhein-Lahn-Kreis, Rhineland-Palatinate
- Seelbach, Altenkirchen, in the district of Altenkirchen, Rhineland-Palatinate
- Seelbach bei Hamm, in the district of Altenkirchen, Rhineland-Palatinate

Seelbach may also refer to:

- The Seelbach Hotel in Louisville, Kentucky
- A Seelbach, a bourbon and orange liquor based cocktail.
