= Artur Lauinger =

German business journalist of Jewish descent

Artur Lauinger (23 August 1879 in Augsburg – 15 October 1961 in Frankfurt am Main) was a German business journalist of Jewish descent.,

== Life ==
Artur Lauinger was the second son of the Jewish businessman Heinrich Lauinger. After earning the Abitur in Karlsruhe, he studied in Tübingen and Munich. From 1902 he worked as editor for the Berliner Tageblatt. In October 1907 he moved to the business department of the Frankfurter Zeitung, remaining there for more than thirty years.

After the Nazis seized power, Lauinger received a berufsverbot, a professional disqualification, and was interned at Buchenwald concentration camp in November 1938. In 1939 he emigrated to England where he worked as a freelance writer for papers in Britain and Switzerland.

After the end of World War II, he returned to Frankfurt in 1946 and worked for the Stuttgarter Zeitung, the Frankfurter Allgemeine Zeitung, and the Frankfurter Neue Presse. In 1954 he was a guest lecturer at the University of Frankfurt.

Lauinger died in Frankfurt on 15 October 1961. He was the father of the LGBT activist and Swingjugend Wolfgang Lauinger, who was born in Switzerland in 1918, with his Christian wife, Mathilde.
