= Nassau, Rhineland-Palatinate =

Nassau
- Town
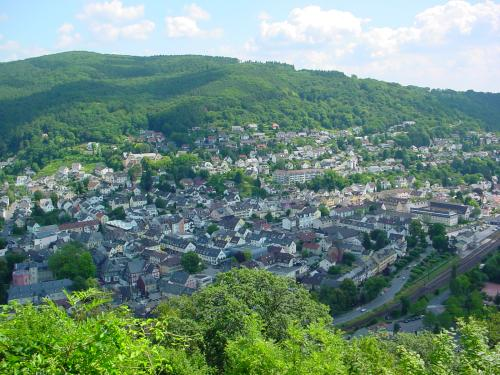

- Coat of arms

- Location of Nassau within Rhein-Lahn-Kreis district
- Interactive map of Nassau
- Location within Germany Location within Rhineland-Palatinate
- Coordinates: 50°18′57″N 7°48′08″E
- Country: Germany
- State: Rhineland-Palatinate
- District: Rhein-Lahn-Kreis
- Municipal assoc.: Bad Ems-Nassau

Government
  - Mayor (2019–24): Manuel Liguori (SPD)

Area
  - Total: 17.55 km^{2} (6.78 sq mi)
- Elevation: 100 m (330 ft)

Population (2025-12-31)
  - Total: 4,802
  - Density: 273.6/km^{2} (708.7/sq mi)
- Time zone: UTC+01:00 (CET)
  - Summer (DST): UTC+02:00 (CEST)
- Postal codes: 56377
- Dialling codes: 02604
- Vehicle registration: EMS, DIZ, GOH
- Website: www.stadt-nassau.de

Nassau (/ˈnæsɔː/ NASS-aw, also UK: /ˈnæsaʊ/ NASS-ow, US: /ˈnɑːsaʊ/ NAHSS-ow, German: [ˈnasaʊ]) is a town located in the German state of Rhineland-Palatinate. It lies on the lower course of the Lahn River, on the mouth of the Mühlbach, between Limburg an der Lahn and the spa town of Bad Ems, and is located in the Nassau Nature Park, surrounded by the Westerwald to the north and the Taunus to the south. The town is on the German-Dutch holiday road, the Orange Route. As of 2021, it had a population of 4,592.

As the location of Nassau Castle and the former Stein and Heidenpütz castles, Nassau gave its name to the wider region surrounding it as well as to a prominent aristocratic dynasty, and through it, directly or indirectly to numerous other things worldwide, including a sovereign state; a Prussian province; the Dutch royal house; the Luxembourgish ducal house; the capital of the Bahamas; one of the Cook Islands; and in the US, a county in Florida and a county in New York.

== Etymology ==
In German, nass means "wet" and die Au (feminine gender)—more often written as die Aue—can be a short form of either Flussaue (floodplain) or Auwald (riparian forest). It can also be used as a synonym for Feuchtwiese (wet meadow). Au(e) derives from Middle High German ouwe, which is related to the Latin aqua ("water"). In the grammatically correct form, "wet floodplain/wet riparian forest" would be nasse Au or nasse Aue, but as a place name, it exists as Nassau. Several places in the German-speaking area are named Nassau, but globally, most places and things named Nassau are ultimately and indirectly named after Nassau, Rhineland-Palatinate, because the region of Nassau and the House of Nassau derive their names from it.

== Geography ==
Nassau is located on the lower course of the Lahn river, between the cities of Limburg an der Lahn and Bad Ems. Within Nassau's city limits, the Mühlbach (de: Mühlbach (Lahn)) flows into the Lahn. The Lahn joins the Rhine at Lahnstein. The closest city with more than 100,000 inhabitants is Koblenz. Other close by cities are Wiesbaden, Mainz, Bonn and Frankfurt. Most of the city (the districts north of the Lahn including the city center) lie in the Westerwald mountain range—the precise part of the Westerwald around Nassau is called Montabaurer Westerwald (Montabaur Westerwald), the southernmost foothills of the mountain range. The Nassauian districts south of the Lahn including Nassau Castle on the other hand, are located in the northernmost foothills of the Taunus mountain range—more precisely in the Westlicher Hintertaunus (Western Rear Taunus). The Lahn is the natural boundary between Westerwald and Taunus.

Administratively, Nassau is located in the Rhine-Lahn district (Rhein-Lahn-Kreis; seat: Bad Ems) in Rhineland-Palatinate (capital: Mainz). The city consists of two quarters: Nassau (with Elisenhütte, Obergutenau, Scheuern, Schützenhaus and Untergutenau) and Bergnassau (with Burg Nassau, Hühnerfarm, Koppelheck and Langau).

== Traffic ==
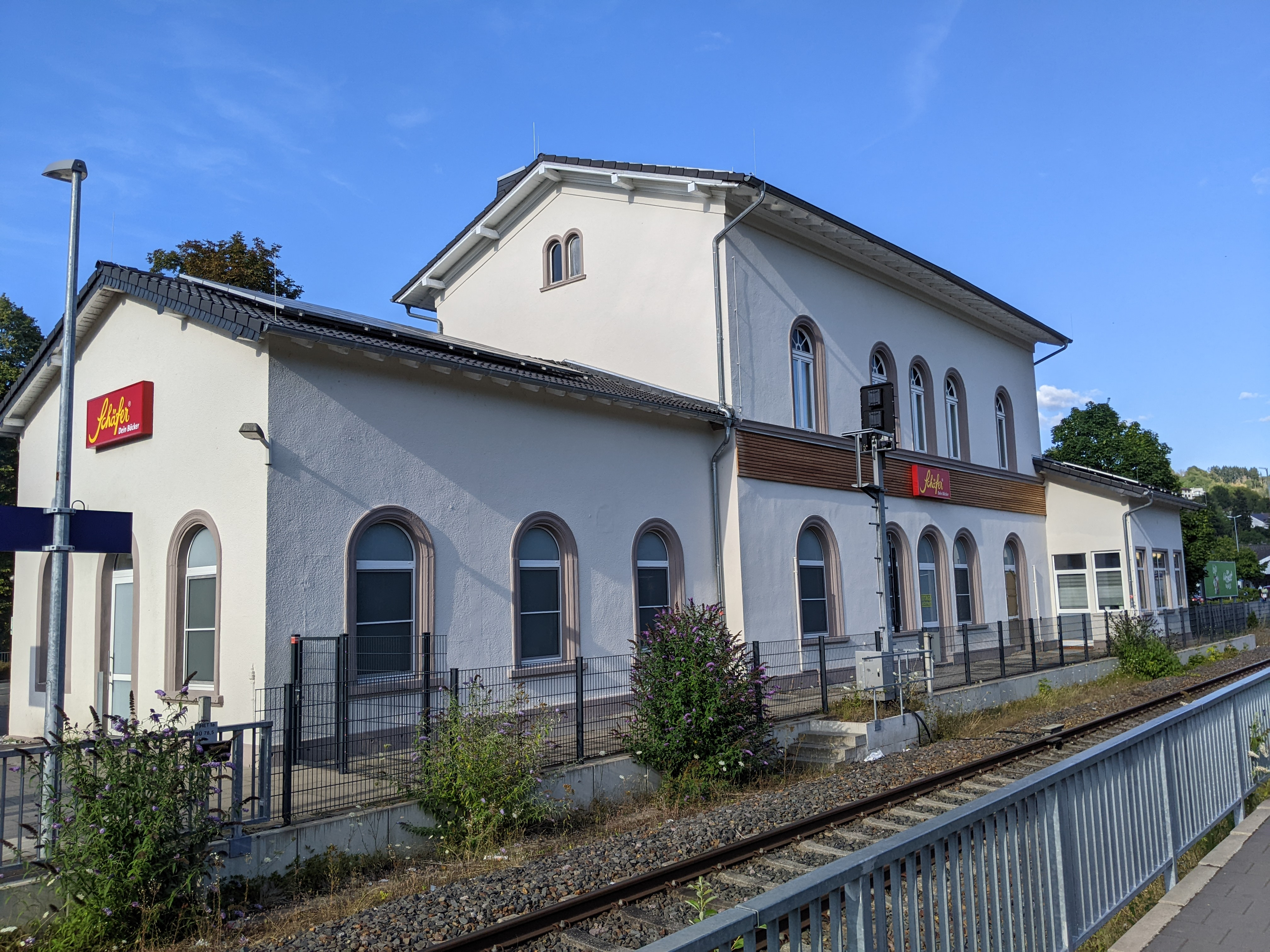
Nassau station

Nassau has a station called Nassau (Lahn) on the Lahn Valley Railway (Lahntalbahn), part of Lahn-Eifel-Bahn section of DB, which follows the meandering Lahn from Koblenz up to Wetzlar—via Niederlahnstein, Bad Ems, Nassau, Balduinstein, Diez, Limburg an der Lahn and Weilburg, and crosses the Rhine between Koblenz-Oberwerth and Koblenz-Horchheim. Close to Nassau are two stations of the Cologne–Frankfurt high-speed rail line connecting Frankfurt and Wiesbaden to Bonn, Cologne, Düsseldorf and the Ruhr. The closer station is Montabaur in Rhineland-Palatinate. The second station is Limburg Süd (Limburg South) in Hesse. The latter is the only station in Germany where only long-distance trains stop, with no connections to regional trains. In Montabaur it is possible to change trains to Limburg an der Lahn. Nassau is located in the zone number 513 of the transport association Verkehrsverbund Rhein-Mosel (VRM).

== History ==
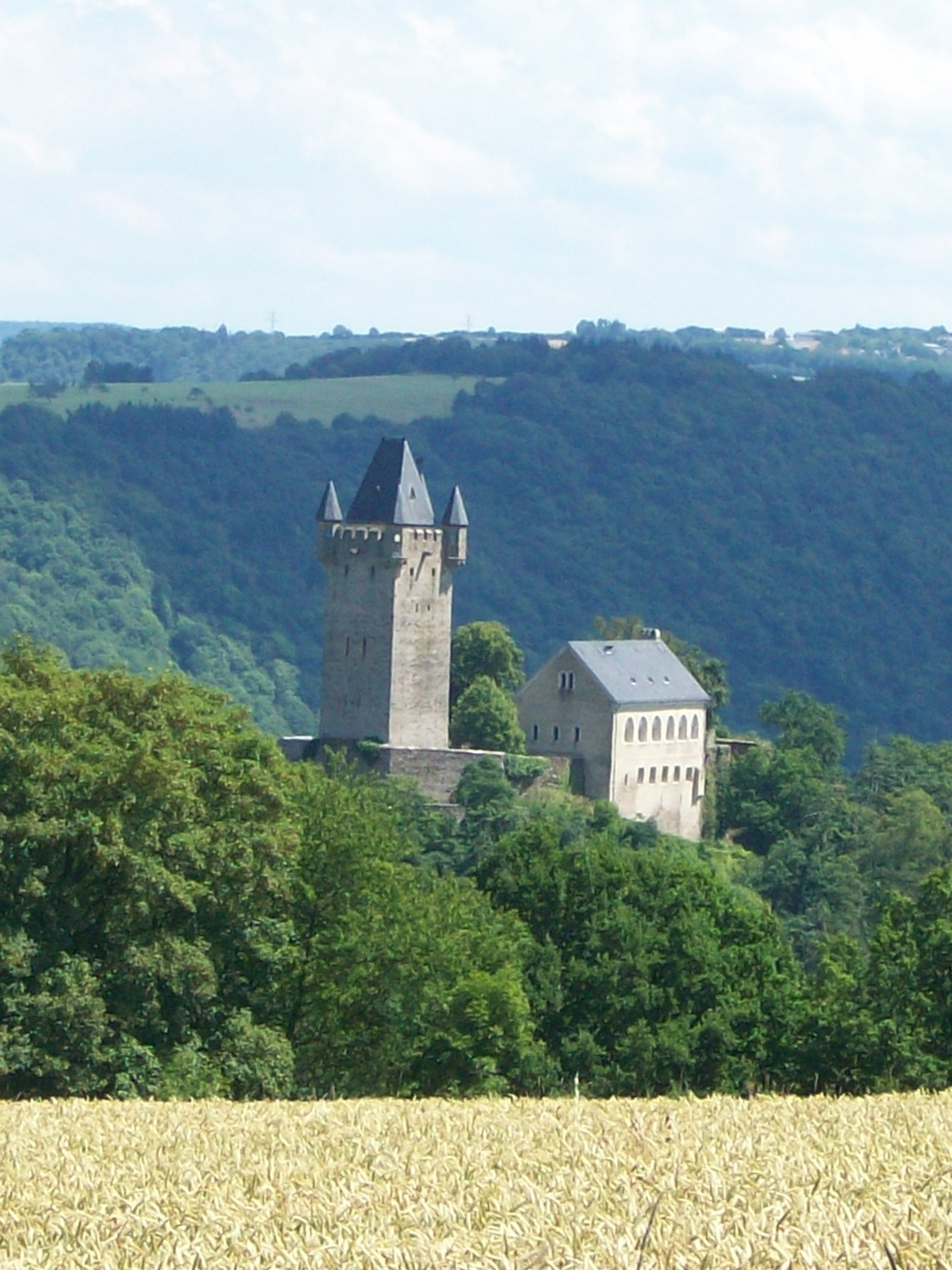
Nassau Castle—ancestral seat of the House of Nassau—above the Lahn valley. The lordship associated with Nassau Castle was the namesake of numerous other entities called "Nassau".

The earliest known surviving mention of Nassau refers to the Villa Nassova estate of the Bishopric of Worms in a 915 deed. In 1348 the Emperor Charles IV granted Nassau town-privileges rights together with nearby Dausenau and Scheuern. Count Dudo-Heinrich of Laurenburg had the Nassau Castle built about 1100 and his descendants began to call themselves the Counts of Nassau.

Count Adolf of Nassau served as the elected King of the Romans from 1292 until his death on 2 July 1298. The Counts of Nassau married into the line of the neighbouring Counts of Arnstein (Obernhof/Attenhausen), founders of the monastery at Arnstein. After the dissolution of the Holy Roman Empire in 1806, the town became part of the Duchy of Nassau.

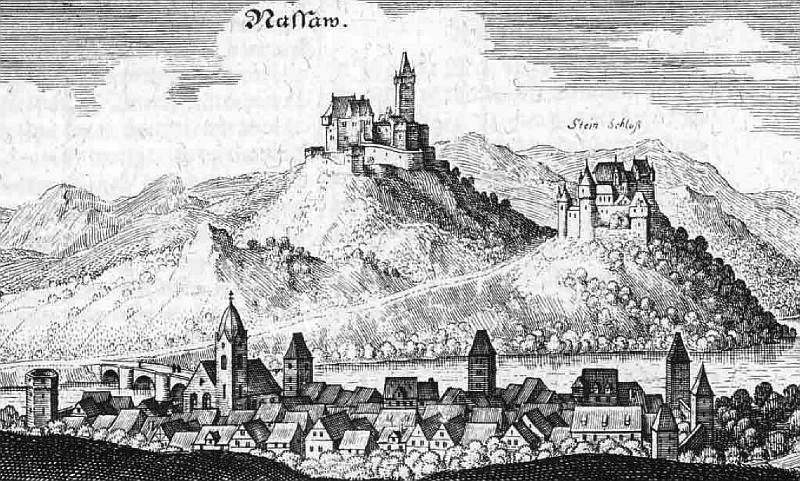
Nassau in Matthäus Merian's Topographia Hassiae, in 1655. The city with the two castles Nassau Castle and Stein Castle (de: Steinsche Burg, now only a ruin) on the other side of the Lahn.

Nassau suffered heavily from bombings by American B-26 Marauders during World War II, all three hospitals and almost all of the inner city were completely destroyed.

Despite the ancient and eventful history of this town, it had a population of fewer than 5,000 inhabitants as of 2012.

The town of Nassau became the namesake of the Duchy of Nassau, the royal House of Nassau and its branch named the House of Orange-Nassau, and the Prussian province of Hesse-Nassau. William III of England obtained a title Nassau. The Grand Duke of Luxembourg still uses Nassau as a title and it is also part of the Dutch royal family (called Orange-Nassau). Its name has also spawned a multitude of other namings in the Americas, such as Nassau, the capital city of the Bahamas, and Nassau County, New York, in the United States. The name also occurs in the titles of ships, buildings, and even a type of bet used in golf.

== Main sights ==
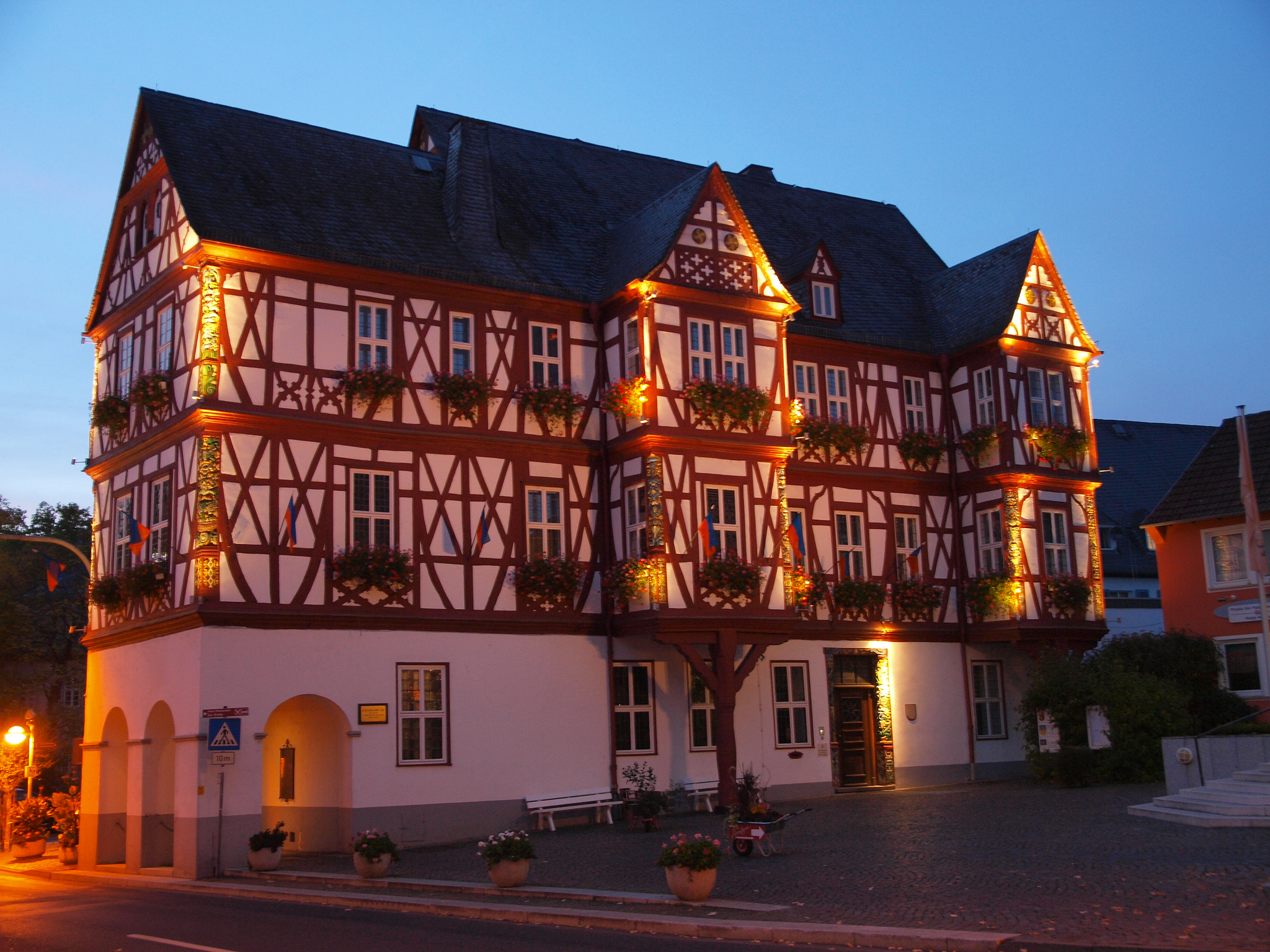
Nassau city hall

Located in Nassau, south of the river Lahn, is Nassau Castle. It is the eponymous ancestral seat of the counts of Nassau and thus the joint ancestral castle of the House of Orange-Nassau—the Dutch royal house (German: Haus Oranien-Nassau)—and of the House of Luxembourg-Nassau/House of Nassau-Weilburg—the Luxembourgish grand ducal house.

Also located in Nassau above the Lahn valley is the castle ruin Stein (de: Steinsche Burg), and in Nassau-Scheuern exists Castle Heidenpütz (de: Burg Heidenpütz), which is a burgstall (a castle of which less than a ruin is left).

The town is also home to the Stein city castle (de: Steinsches Schloss), the seat of the Reichsfreiherren (Barons) vom und zum Stein, and birthplace of the Prussian reformer and Minister Heinrich Friedrich Karl, Reichsfreiherr vom und zum Stein.

== People ==
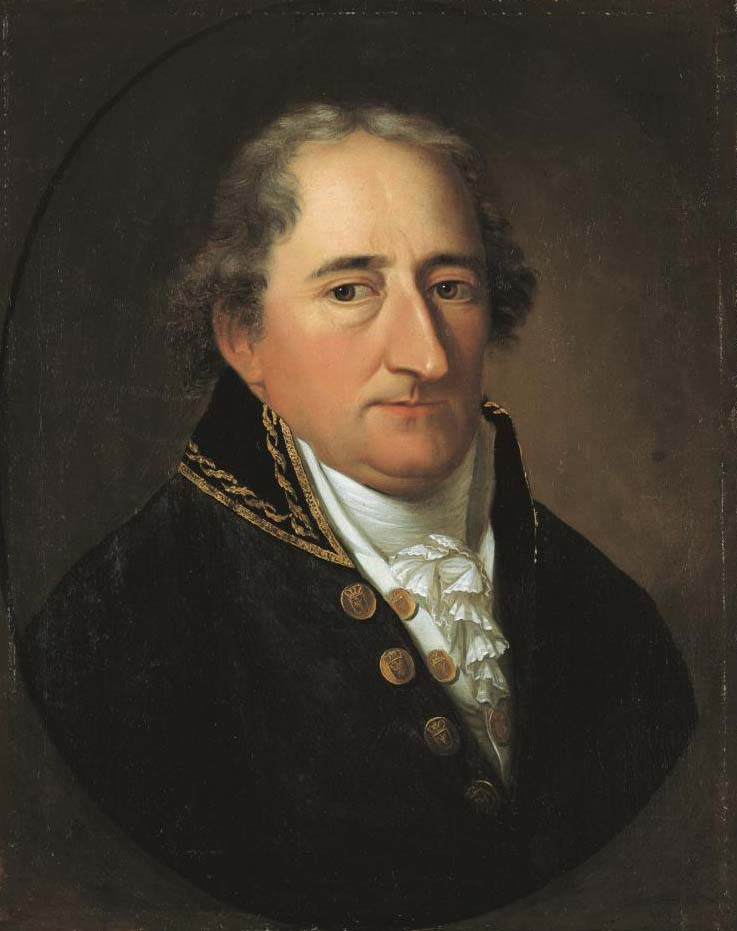
Portrait of Heinrich Friedrich Karl vom und zum Stein, 1804

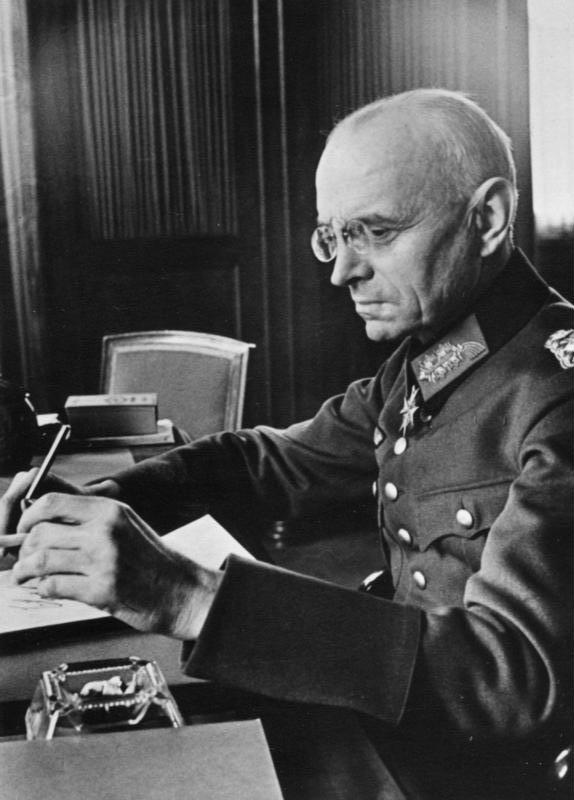
Alexander von Falkenhausen in 1940

The Imperial Baron Heinrich Friedrich Karl vom und zum Stein, Prussian statesman and reformer, was born in Nassau on October 25, 1757. Here he wrote his famous Nassauer Memorandum of 1807. Stein descended from an ancient aristocratic dynasty, who had been residents of Nassau since the 12th century. The family estate lies in the centre of the town, called the Steinische Hof, which today is still in the possession of the descendants of the reformer, the Counts von Kanitz. He died in Cappenberg, district of Selm in the year 1831.

=== Sons and daughters of the city ===
- Johann Philipp Bethmann (1715–1793), banker, founder of the banking firm Bethmann brothers in Frankfurt
- Johann Jakob Bethmann (1717–1792), merchant and shipowner, imperial consul in Bordeaux
- Simon Moritz Bethmann, (1721–1782), banker and patron, co-founder of the Bethmann brothers' bank in Frankfurt
- Arnold Rönnebeck (1885–1947), German-American sculptor, lithograph and museum director of the Denver Art Museum
- Wolfgang Franz (born 1944), economist, 1997–2013 President of the ZEW

== Personalities who are associated with Nassau ==
- Constantin Fahlberg (Tambov 1850 – Nassau 1910), chemist and science researcher
- Alexander von Falkenhausen (Gut Blumenthal 1878 – Nassau 1966), general; military advisor to Chiang Kai-shek; head of the military government of Belgium during German occupation 1940–1944.

== See also ==
- Scheuern Foundation
