= Arzbach =

- Municipality
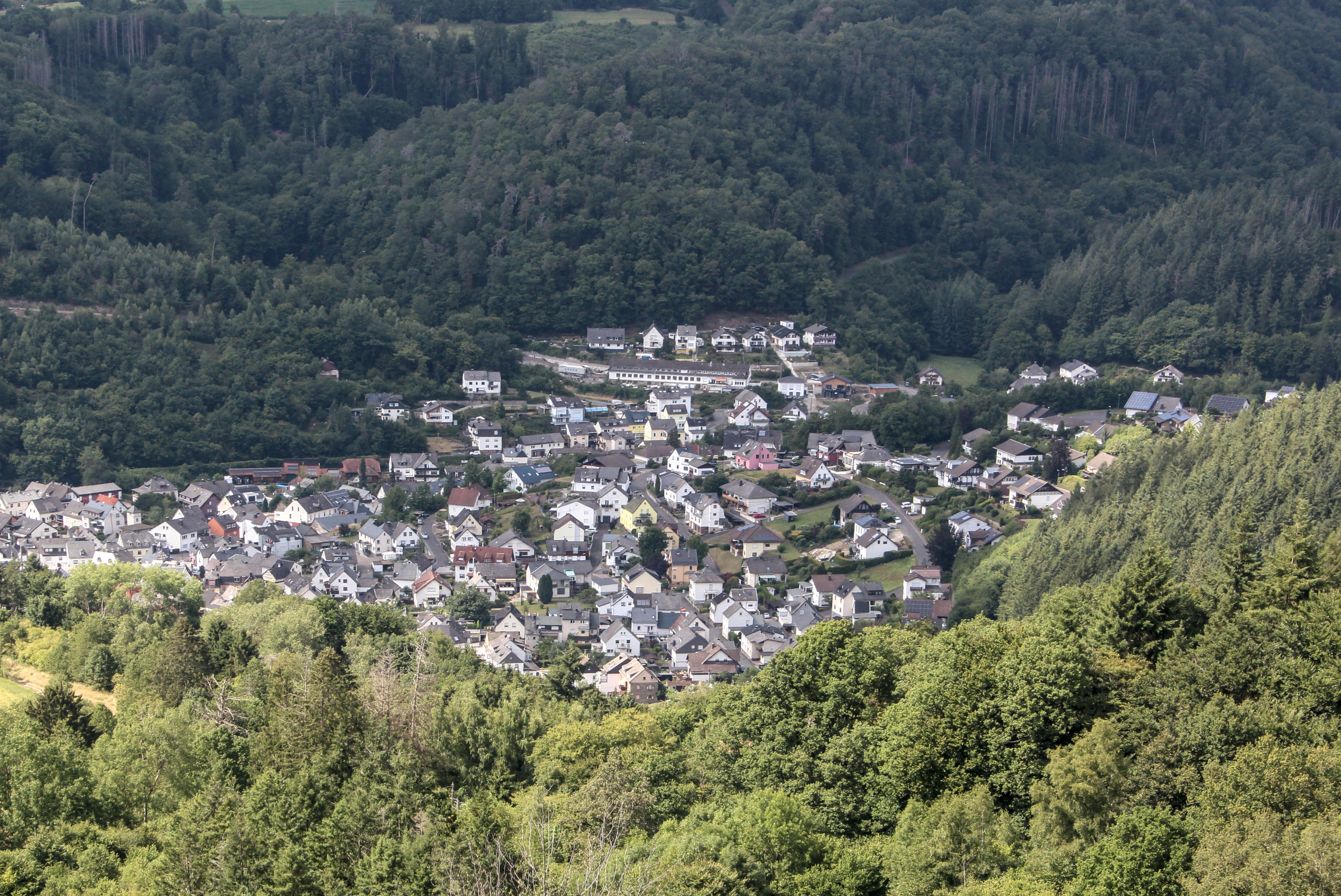

- Coat of arms

- Location of Arzbach within Rhein-Lahn-Kreis district
- Interactive map of Arzbach
- Location within Germany Location within Rhineland-Palatinate
- Coordinates: 50°22′48″N 7°45′00″E
- Country: Germany
- State: Rhineland-Palatinate
- District: Rhein-Lahn-Kreis
- Municipal assoc.: Bad Ems-Nassau

Government
  - Mayor (2019–24): Claus Eschenauer

Area
  - Total: 9.93 km^{2} (3.83 sq mi)
- Elevation: 200 m (660 ft)

Population (2025-12-31)
  - Total: 1,680
  - Density: 169/km^{2} (438/sq mi)
- Time zone: UTC+01:00 (CET)
  - Summer (DST): UTC+02:00 (CEST)
- Postal codes: 56337
- Dialling codes: 02603
- Vehicle registration: EMS, DIZ, GOH
- Website: www.arzbach.de

Arzbach is a municipality in the district of Rhein-Lahn, in Rhineland-Palatinate, in western Germany. It belongs to the association community of Bad Ems-Nassau.
