= Misselberg =

- Municipality
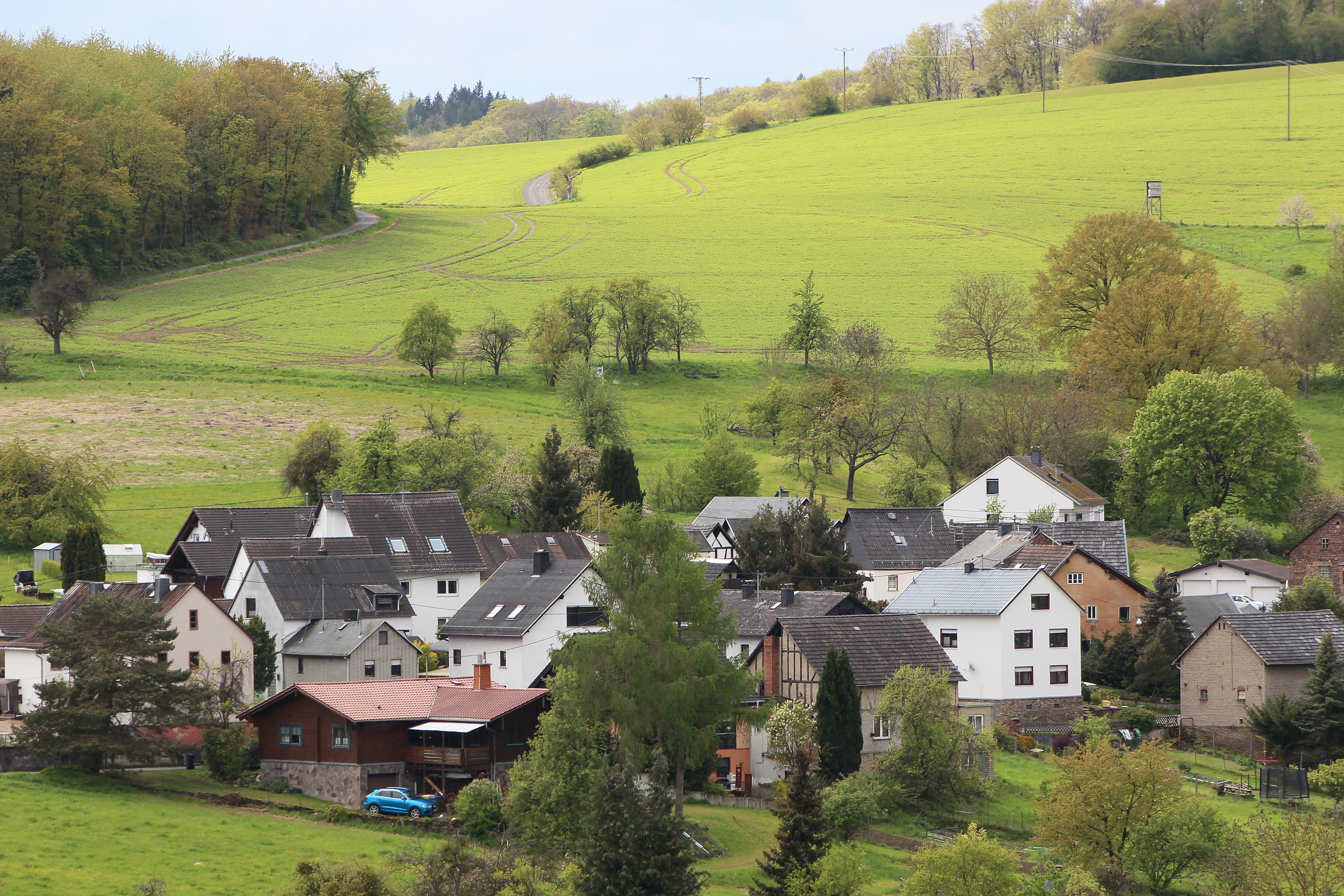

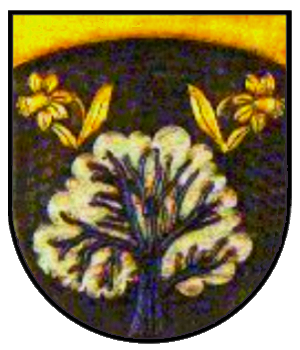
- Coat of arms

- Location of Misselberg within Rhein-Lahn-Kreis district
- Interactive map of Misselberg
- Location within Germany Location within Rhineland-Palatinate
- Coordinates: 50°19′00″N 7°46′00″E
- Country: Germany
- State: Rhineland-Palatinate
- District: Rhein-Lahn-Kreis
- Municipal assoc.: Bad Ems-Nassau

Government
  - Mayor (2019–24): Thomas Schulz

Area
  - Total: 0.74 km^{2} (0.29 sq mi)
- Elevation: 260 m (850 ft)

Population (2025-12-31)
  - Total: 86
  - Density: 120/km^{2} (300/sq mi)
- Time zone: UTC+01:00 (CET)
  - Summer (DST): UTC+02:00 (CEST)
- Postal codes: 56377
- Dialling codes: 02604
- Vehicle registration: EMS, DIZ, GOH

Misselberg is a municipality in the district of Rhein-Lahn, in Rhineland-Palatinate, in western Germany. It belongs to the association community of Bad Ems-Nassau.

== Geography ==
The municipality is located in western Germany, in a rural area of the central Rhine basin. Its postal code is 56377, and territorial records place it at approximate geographic coordinates of 50.3075° N and 7.7679° E.

== History ==
Misselberg is a small German village whose origins date back to the 14th century. It was first mentioned in 1361 under the name Mistelberg. For a long time, it remained a modest hamlet made up of just a few dwellings, before becoming an independent municipality in 1821 after having been administratively attached to Dienethal. Over the centuries, the village changed administrative affiliation several times, passing from the Duchy of Nassau to Prussia, and later to the state of Rhineland-Palatinate after 1946. Today, it is part of the Rhein-Lahn district and has fewer than one hundred inhabitants. Despite its small size, Misselberg has strong local symbols, such as the “Misselblume,” a rare protected flower, and the Knautheiche, a historic oak tree that has become emblematic and appears on the village’s coat of arms.
