= Nassauische Neue Presse =

German newspaper

Nassauische Neue Presse (Nassau New Press) is a newspaper in the Nassau region in western Germany, covering the area of the historical state of Nassau. It has a circulation of over 20,000, and was founded in 1948. It is owned by Frankfurter Neue Presse.
