= Robert Stauch =

German politician

Member of the Bundestag
- In office 7 September 1949 – 17 October 1965

Personal details
- Born: 25 September 1898
- Died: 1 May 1981 (aged 82)
- Party: CDU

Robert Stauch (September 25, 1898 – May 1, 1981) was a German politician of the Christian Democratic Union (CDU) and former member of the German Bundestag.

== Life ==
In the post-war period, Stauch belonged to the German Bundestag as a CDU member from its first election in 1949 to 1965. He represented the constituency of Westerburg in parliament as a member of parliament who was always directly elected. In addition, he was mayor of Katzenelnbogen for many years.

== Literature ==
Herbst, Ludolf; Jahn, Bruno (2002). Vierhaus, Rudolf (ed.). Biographisches Handbuch der Mitglieder des Deutschen Bundestages. 1949–2002 [Biographical Handbook of the Members of the German Bundestag. 1949–2002] (in German). München: De Gruyter - De Gruyter Saur. p. 1715. ISBN 978-3-11-184511-1.
