= Orange Route =

The Orange Route (Dutch: Oranje-Route, German: Oranier-Route) is a holiday route, that runs from Amsterdam in the Netherlands through North and Central Germany and returns to Amsterdam. It is 2,400 kilometres long and crosses the Netherlands and nine of German federated states. The Orange Route runs through towns and regions that linked the House of Orange-Nassau for centuries.

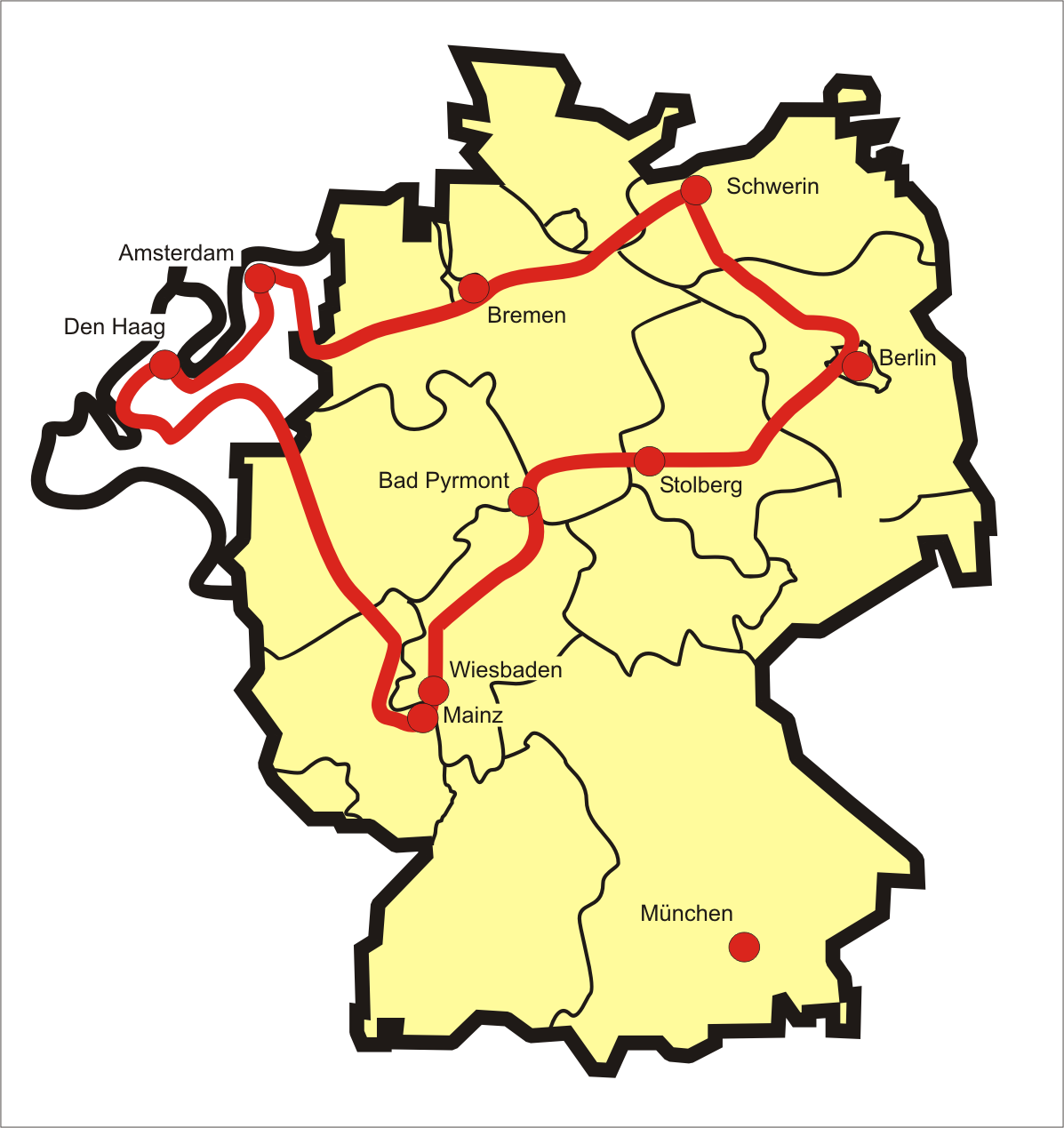
Course of the Orange Route

== States ==
The Orange Route runs from the Netherlands initially through the states of North Rhine-Westphalia, Rhineland-Palatinate and Hesse, first in a southerly, then in a northeasterly direction in order to head for Lower Saxony, Saxony-Anhalt, Brandenburg and Berlin. From there it heads northwest through Mecklenburg-Vorpommern and then turns westwards through Schleswig-Holstein, Bremen and Lower Saxony once again along the North Sea Coast near Amsterdam.

== Landscapes ==
The holiday route crosses a great variety of different landscape types: the North Sea coast and the plains of the Netherlands, the Lower and Middle Rhine Valley, the green, sometimes rugged, sometimes gently Central Uplands, the Havelland, the Mecklenburg Lake District and finally the broad North German Plain. In detail, the regions are, starting from Amsterdam:

- North Sea region
- North Brabant
- Betuwe
- Lower Rhine
- Siegerland
- Middle Rhine
- Lahn
- Rheinhessen
- Westerwald
- Taunus
- Lahn-Dill region
- Waldeck Upland
- Weser Uplands
- Harz Mountains
- Elbe valley
- Havelland
- Mecklenburg Lake District
- Baltic Sea region
- Elbe water meadows
- Lower Weser
- North German Plain
- Veluwe
- Friesland
- West Friesland
- IJsselmeer

== Sights ==
Picturesque towns, castles, palaces and gardens may be found everywhere along this holiday road. Here are some of the places and sights that were linked to the House of Orange-Nassau:

- Amsterdam – Prinsenhof, today the Hotel The Grand
- The Hague (Den Haag) - Residence of Binnenhof
- Delft – St. Agatha's Abbey (Sint Agathakloster)
- Dordrecht – Berckepoort housing complex
- Breda – Breda Castle and the "Prince chapel" at the Onze-Lieve-Vrouwe Church
- Buren (Gelderland) – St. Lambertus' Church
- Apeldoorn – Summer residence of Paleis Het Loo
- Moers – Moers Castle
- Freudenberg – old town / former Nassau border fortifications
- Nassau – Nassau Castle
- Diez – Ladies' residence of Oranienstein with the Nassau-Orange Museum
- Dillenburg – Wilhelmsturm on the Schlossberg, birthplace of William I, Prince of Orange
- Siegen – Siegerland Museum in the Oberen Schloss with the Orange Forum
- Bad Arolsen – Arolsen Castle
- Bad Pyrmont – Summer residence of Schloss Pyrmont with its museum
- Wernigerode – Castle and museum of Wernigerode
- Stolberg (Harz) – Stolberg Castle
- Dessau – Mosigkau Castle
- Oranienbaum – castle and orangery
- Wörlitz – Landscape garden of Wörlitzer Anlagen and castle
- Potsdam – Dutch Quarter, Dutch Mill
- Oranienburg – Oranienburg Palace and orangery
- Schwerin – Residence castle of Schwerin and Ludwigslust Castle
- Hitzacker – Prince Claus memorial busts
- Lingen – old town
- Nordhorn – Frenswegen Abbey
- Kamp-Lintfort – Kamp Abbey
- Leeuwarden – Princessehof Palace and Prinsentuin Gardens
