= Pohl, Germany =

Municipality in Rhineland-Palatinate, Germany

Pohl
- Municipality
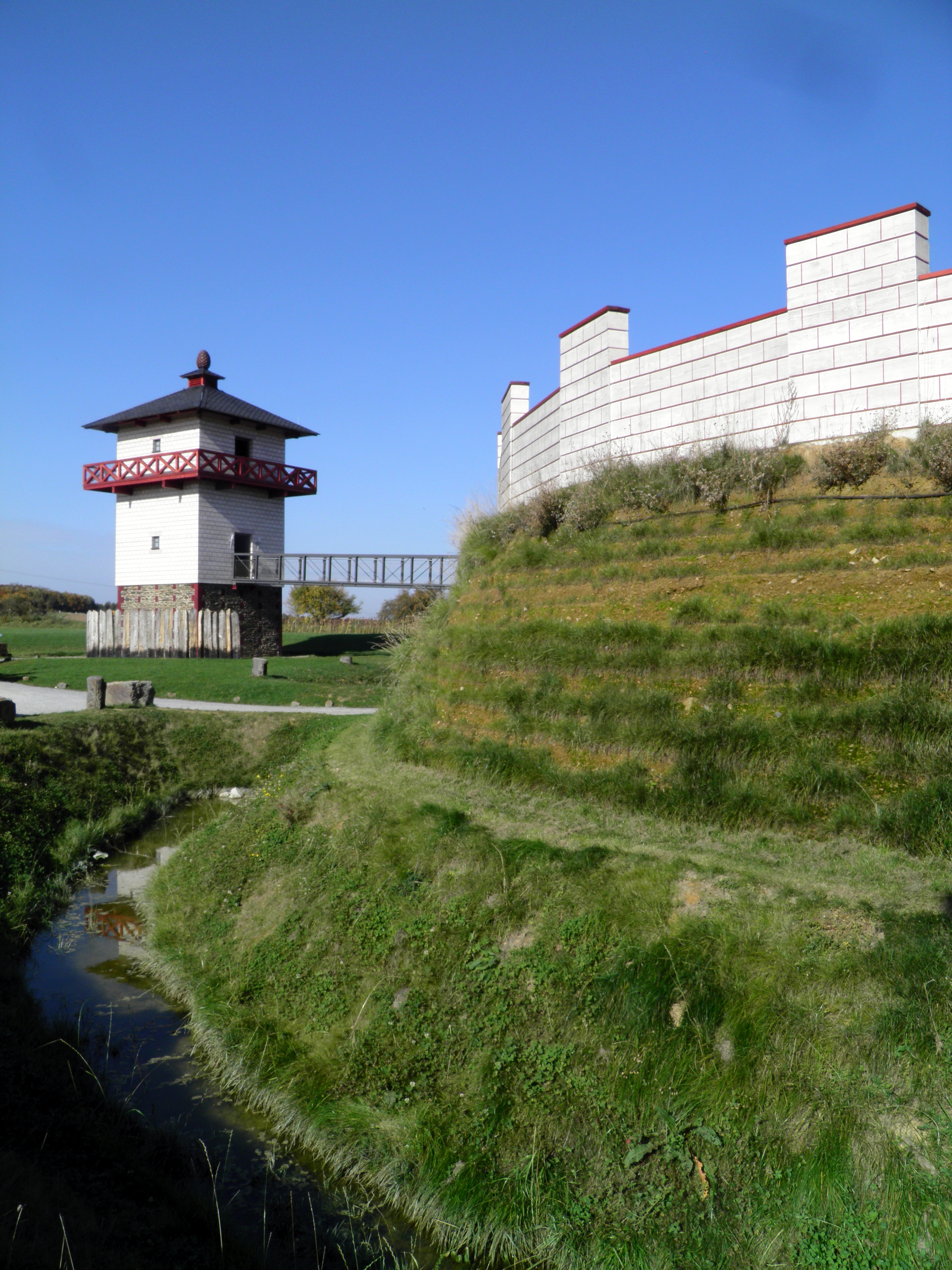
- Reconstructed Roman watchtower built in 2011

- Coat of arms

- Location of Pohl within Rhein-Lahn-Kreis district
- Interactive map of Pohl
- Location within Germany Location within Rhineland-Palatinate
- Coordinates: 50°15′3″N 7°51′51″E
- Country: Germany
- State: Rhineland-Palatinate
- District: Rhein-Lahn-Kreis
- Municipal assoc.: Bad Ems-Nassau
- Founded: 1247 (779 years ago)

Government
  - Mayor: Holger Güth (acting)

Area
  - Total: 4.23 km^{2} (1.63 sq mi)
- Elevation: 330 m (1,080 ft)

Population (2025-12-31)
  - Total: 339
  - Density: 80.1/km^{2} (208/sq mi)
- Time zone: UTC+01:00 (CET)
  - Summer (DST): UTC+02:00 (CEST)
- Postal codes: 56357
- Dialling codes: 06772
- Vehicle registration: EMS, DIZ, GOH
- Website: www.gemeinde-pohl.de

Pohl (German pronunciation: [poːl]) is a municipality in the district of Rhein-Lahn, in Rhineland-Palatinate, Germany. It belongs to the association community of Bad Ems-Nassau.

== Limeskastell Pohl ==
Limeskastell Pohl is a reconstructed Roman wood and earth fort and watchtower. The fort is part of the Lower German Limes UNESCO World Heritage Site.
