= Harald Orthey =

German politician

Member of the Bundestag from Montabaur
- Incumbent
- Assumed office 2025

Personal details
- Born: 25 June 1968 (age 57) Hachenburg
- Party: CDU
- Website: www.harald-orthey.de

Harald Stefan Orthey (born 25 June 1968) is a German politician from the Christian Democratic Union of Germany. He was elected to the Bundestag in the 2025 German federal election. He was a direct candidate in the constituency of Montabaur. He is a business economist and hails from Hattert in the Westerwald region.
