= Gabi Weber =

German politician (born 1955)

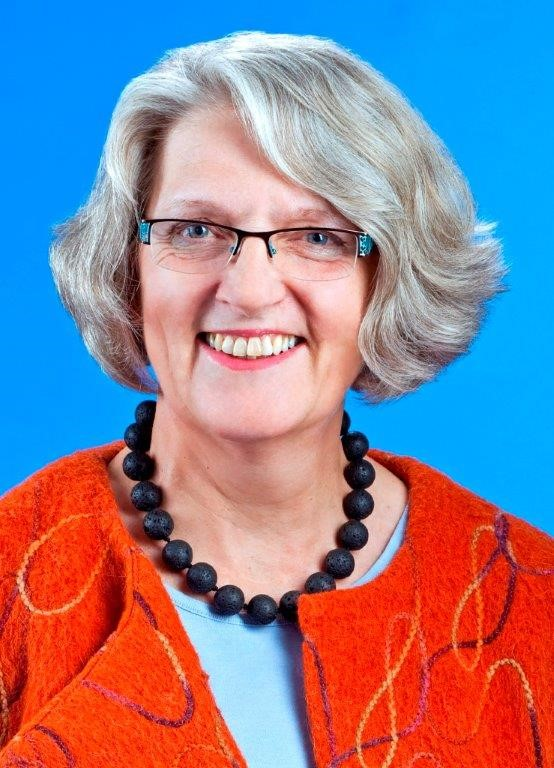

Member of the Bundestag for Rhineland-Palatinate
- In office 22 October 2013 – 2021

Personal details
- Born: March 24, 1955 (age 71) Ebernhahn, Rhineland-Palatinate, West Germany (now Germany)
- Citizenship: German
- Party: German: Social Democratic Party; EU: Party of European Socialists

Gabriele "Gabi" Weber (born 24 March 1955) is a German politician of the Social Democratic Party (SPD) who served as a member of the German Bundestag from 2013 until 2021.

== Early life and career ==
Weber went to college from 1969 to 1972 and did a training as a ceramic painter. She worked in this profession until 1980.

Since 1969, Weber has been a member of the union IG Chemie-Papier-Keramik (trade union for Chemistry-Paper-Ceramics in Germany). From 1980 to 1982 she was trained as a full-time union secretary. From 1980 to 1991 she was Union Secretary at the Confederation of German Trade Unions (DGB) in the city of Kassel. In the same position, she was employed from 1991 to 1993 for DGB Rhein-Lahn and from 1996 to 2001 DGB Koblenz; from 1993 to 1995 she served as chairperson of the DGB district Rhein-Lahn. From 2001 up until November 2015 she was union chairwoman of the DGB Region Koblenz.

== Political career ==
=== Role in regional politics ===
Since 1972 Weber has been member of the centre-left SPD. From 1998 to 2003 she was a member of the local council of Verbandsgemeinde Wirges. Since 2009 she has been serving on the city council of Wirges.

=== Member of the German Bundestag, 2013–2021 ===
In the 2013 national elections, Weber stood as a candidate in the parliamentary constituency of Montabaur and at no. 9 at the Rhineland-Palatinate state list of SPD, led by Andrea Nahles. She was subsequently elected to the German Bundestag.

In her first term, Weber was a member the Defence Committee, the Committee on Economic Cooperation and Development and the Sub-Committee on Civilian Crisis Prevention and Integrated Conflict Management. In addition, she served as vice-chairwoman of the Parliamentary Friendship Group for the States of East Africa, which is in charge of maintaining inter-parliamentary relations with Ethiopia, Burundi, Djibouti, Eritrea, Kenya, Rwanda, Somalia, Sudan and Uganda; thus far, Weber has visited Kenya, Rwanda and Burundi.

A member of the Defence Committee, Weber served as the SPD parliamentary group’s rapporteur on the budget of the Federal Ministry of Defence as well as on relations to the Baltic states and Scandinavia. On the Committee on Economic Cooperation and Development, she was her parliamentary group’s rapporteur on arms exports as well as on Afghanistan, Pakistan, South Asia and East Africa. Within her parliamentary group, she served as deputy spokesperson on security policy and as member of the working group on demographic change.

In the negotiations to form a coalition government under the leadership of Chancellor Angela Merkel following the 2017 federal elections, Weber was part of the working group on foreign policy, led by Ursula von der Leyen, Gerd Müller and Sigmar Gabriel.

In February 2020, Weber announced that she would not stand in the 2021 federal elections but instead resign from active politics by the end of the parliamentary term.

== Other activities ==
- German Africa Foundation, Member of the Board

== Political positions ==
Weber has in the past voted in favor of German participation in United Nations peacekeeping missions as well as in United Nations-mandated European Union peacekeeping missions on the African continent, such as in Somalia – both Operation Atalanta and EUTM Somalia – (2014, 2015 and 2016), Darfur/Sudan (2013, 2014 and 2015), South Sudan (2013, 2014 and 2015), Mali (2014, 2015 and 2016), the Central African Republic (2014) and Liberia (2015).
