= Schweighausen =

- Municipality
- Coat of arms

- Location of Schweighausen within Rhein-Lahn-Kreis district
- Interactive map of Schweighausen
- Location within Germany Location within Rhineland-Palatinate
- Coordinates: 50°16′56″N 7°45′45″E
- Country: Germany
- State: Rhineland-Palatinate
- District: Rhein-Lahn-Kreis
- Municipal assoc.: Bad Ems-Nassau

Government
  - Mayor (2019–24): Sonja Puggé

Area
  - Total: 3.66 km^{2} (1.41 sq mi)
- Elevation: 370 m (1,210 ft)

Population (2025-12-31)
  - Total: 219
  - Density: 59.8/km^{2} (155/sq mi)
- Time zone: UTC+01:00 (CET)
  - Summer (DST): UTC+02:00 (CEST)
- Postal codes: 56377
- Dialling codes: 02604
- Vehicle registration: EMS, DIZ, GOH
- Website: www.schweighausen-taunus.de

Schweighausen is a municipality in the district of Rhein-Lahn, in Rhineland-Palatinate, in western Germany. It belongs to the association community of Bad Ems-Nassau.

== Geography ==
The municipality of Schweighausen is located in Rhein‑Lahn‑Kreis in the state of Rhineland‑Palatinate in western Germany. The town covers an area of 3.66 km² and lies at an elevation of approximately 370 meters above sea level. It is situated in the Hintertaunus region, near the banks of the Lahn and Rhein rivers, and is part of the municipal association Verbandsgemeinde Bad Ems‑Nassau.
