= Dornholzhausen =

- Municipality
- Coat of arms

- Location of Dornholzhausen within Rhein-Lahn-Kreis district
- Interactive map of Dornholzhausen
- Location within Germany Location within Rhineland-Palatinate
- Coordinates: 50°16′16.34″N 7°47′23.41″E
- Country: Germany
- State: Rhineland-Palatinate
- District: Rhein-Lahn-Kreis
- Municipal assoc.: Bad Ems-Nassau

Government
  - Mayor (2019–24): Ilona Köhler-Heymann

Area
  - Total: 3.93 km^{2} (1.52 sq mi)
- Elevation: 305 m (1,001 ft)

Population (2025-12-31)
  - Total: 198
  - Density: 50.4/km^{2} (130/sq mi)
- Time zone: UTC+01:00 (CET)
  - Summer (DST): UTC+02:00 (CEST)
- Postal codes: 56357
- Dialling codes: 02604
- Vehicle registration: EMS, DIZ, GOH

Dornholzhausen is a municipality in the district of Rhein-Lahn, in Rhineland-Palatinate, in western Germany. It belongs to the association community of Bad Ems-Nassau.
