= Winden, Rhein-Lahn =

Winden
- Municipality
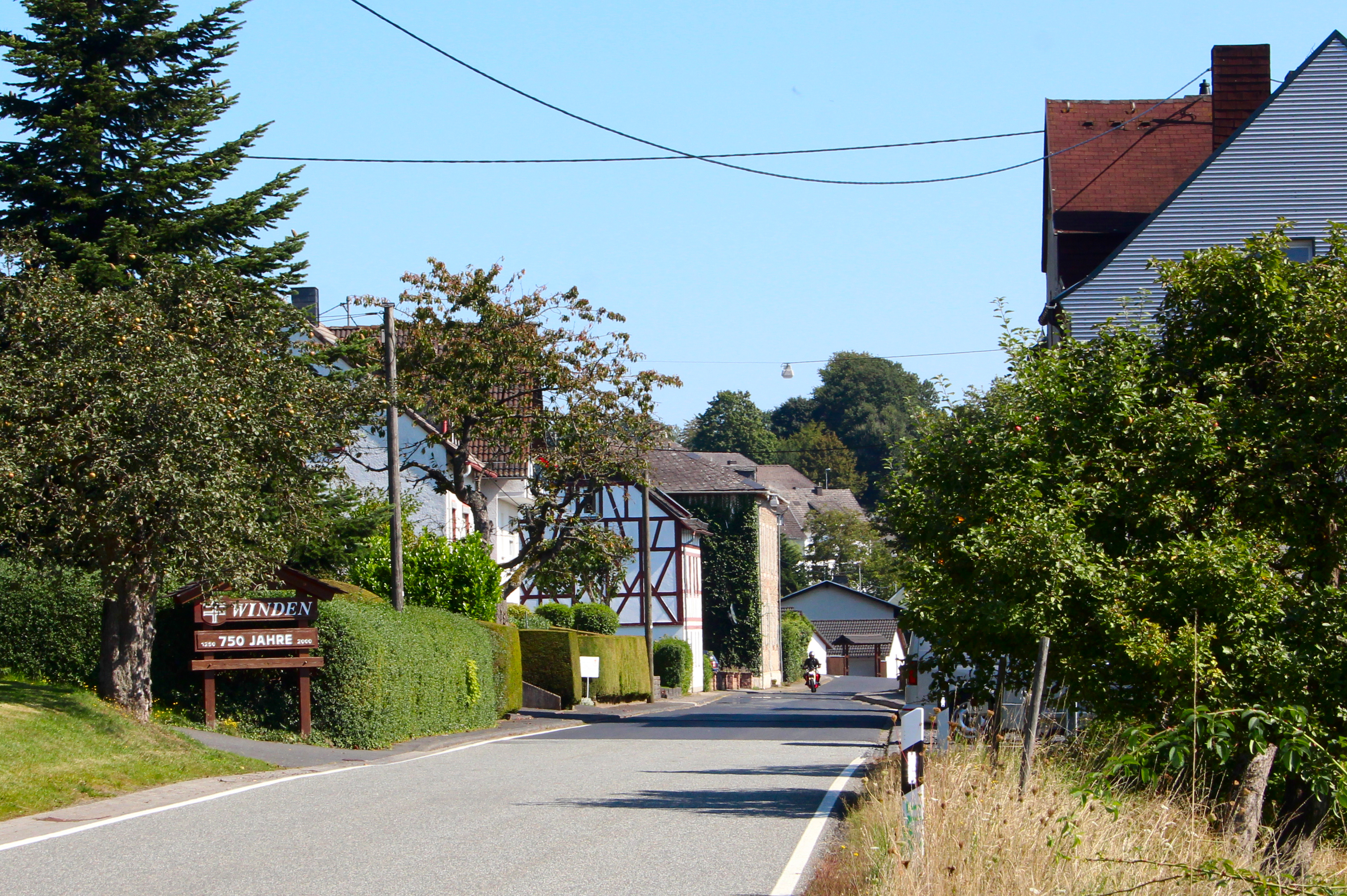

- Coat of arms

- Location of Winden within Rhein-Lahn-Kreis district
- Interactive map of Winden
- Location within Germany Location within Rhineland-Palatinate
- Coordinates: 50°20′23″N 7°49′57″E
- Country: Germany
- State: Rhineland-Palatinate
- District: Rhein-Lahn-Kreis
- Municipal assoc.: Bad Ems-Nassau

Government
  - Mayor (2019–24): Stefan Mertlich

Area
  - Total: 6.94 km^{2} (2.68 sq mi)
- Elevation: 370 m (1,210 ft)

Population (2025-12-31)
  - Total: 714
  - Density: 103/km^{2} (266/sq mi)
- Time zone: UTC+01:00 (CET)
  - Summer (DST): UTC+02:00 (CEST)
- Postal codes: 56379
- Dialling codes: 02604
- Vehicle registration: EMS, DIZ, GOH

Winden (German pronunciation: [ˈvɪndn̩]) is a municipality in the district of Rhein-Lahn, in Rhineland-Palatinate, in western Germany. It belongs to the association community of Bad Ems-Nassau.
