= Frankfurter Neue Presse =

German daily newspaper

- Type: Daily newspaper
- Format: Broadsheet
- Publisher: Frankfurter Societät
- Editor-in-chief: Max Rempel
- Founded: April 15, 1946; 79 years ago
- Language: German
- Headquarters: Frankfurt, Germany
- Website: www.fnp.de

The Frankfurter Neue Presse (FNP; "Frankfurt New Press") is a German daily newspaper based in Frankfurt am Main and focused on local and regional topics.

== History ==
The FNP was founded on 15 April 1946 under a license of the American military government. It was license No. 32 in the US zone, given to Hugo Stenzel and August Heinrich Berning.

From 20 Januar 1949, Stenzel was the only publisher until his death on 20 July 1964. He was succeeded by Werner Wirthle, followed from 1991 to March 2007 by Volker W. Grams, from 1 April 2007 by Hans Homrighausen, and from March 2015 by Oliver Rohloff.

In 1946 the goals were defined: "Für Völkerversöhnung, religiöse Toleranz, sozialen Fortschritt und Politik einer breiten positiven Mitte. Gegen Nationalismus. Für Demokratie, gegen verderbliche Vorurteile, für kulturellen Neubau aus echten Kräften und gegen die Zersetzung des Lebens" (For reconciliation among nations, religious tolerance, social progress and politics of a large positive center. Against nationalism. For democracy, against dangerous bias, for new cultural structures from authentic powers and against a subversion of life).

== Service ==
The city edition serves the city center and the suburbs in the south, east and north. Several papers, distinguished by header and a regional section, cover the greater area. The Höchster Kreisblatt is for the western part of Frankfurt and the Main-Taunus-Kreis. The Nassauische Neue Presse appears for the Limburg region, the Westerwaldkreis, and parts of the Rhein-Lahn-Kreis. The Taunus-Zeitung and the Usinger Neue Presse serve the Hochtaunuskreis. The Bad Vilbeler Neue Presse appears for Bad Vilbel, Karben, the Wetterau and parts of the Main-Kinzig-Kreis. The Neu-Isenburger Neue Presse covers communities around Neu-Isenburg to the Kreis Groß-Gerau. The Rüsselsheimer Echo appears from 2015 for Rüsselsheim am Main and die surrounding towns.

== Literature ==
- Estermann, Alfred (1994). Zeitungsstadt Frankfurt am Main (in German). ISBN 3-89282-028-7.
- Gutberlet, D. (1965). Die "Frankfurter Neue Presse". Institut für Wissenschaftliche Politik der Philipps-Universität Marburg (in German). Frankf. Societäts-Dr.
