= Hömberg =

- Municipality
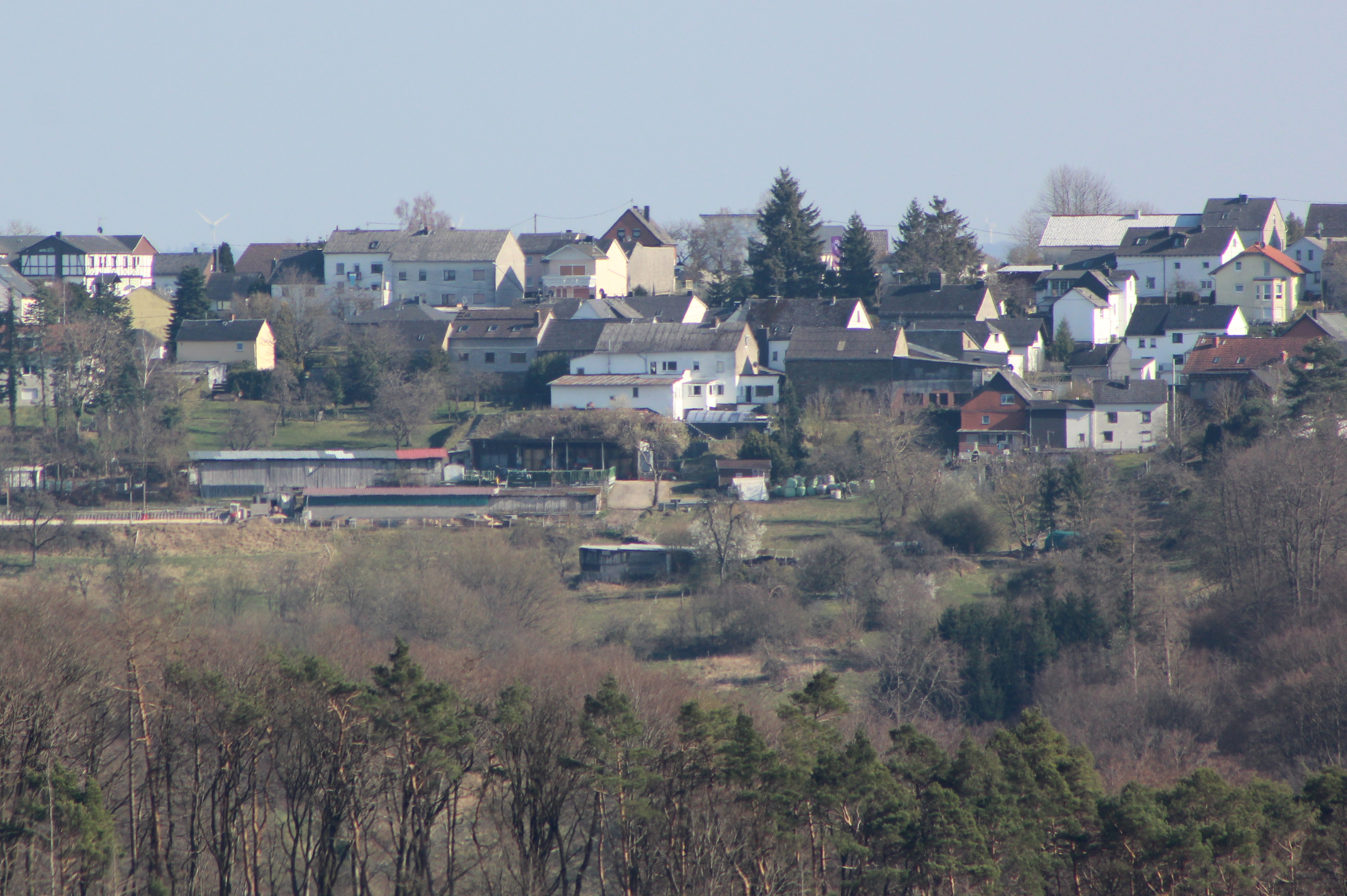

- Coat of arms

- Location of Hömberg within Rhein-Lahn-Kreis district
- Interactive map of Hömberg
- Location within Germany Location within Rhineland-Palatinate
- Coordinates: 50°20′14″N 7°47′00″E
- Country: Germany
- State: Rhineland-Palatinate
- District: Rhein-Lahn-Kreis
- Municipal assoc.: Bad Ems-Nassau

Government
  - Mayor (2019–24): Dietmar Roßtäuscher

Area
  - Total: 4.86 km^{2} (1.88 sq mi)
- Elevation: 372 m (1,220 ft)

Population (2025-12-31)
  - Total: 326
  - Density: 67.1/km^{2} (174/sq mi)
- Time zone: UTC+01:00 (CET)
  - Summer (DST): UTC+02:00 (CEST)
- Postal codes: 56379
- Dialling codes: 02604
- Vehicle registration: EMS, DIZ, GOH

Hömberg is a municipality in the district of Rhein-Lahn, in Rhineland-Palatinate, in western Germany. It belongs to the association community of Bad Ems-Nassau.
