= Oberwies =

- Municipality
- Coat of arms

- Location of Oberwies within Rhein-Lahn-Kreis district
- Interactive map of Oberwies
- Location within Germany Location within Rhineland-Palatinate
- Coordinates: 50°17′19″N 7°46′50″E
- Country: Germany
- State: Rhineland-Palatinate
- District: Rhein-Lahn-Kreis
- Municipal assoc.: Bad Ems-Nassau

Government
  - Mayor (2019–24): Dieter Pfaff

Area
  - Total: 2.02 km^{2} (0.78 sq mi)
- Elevation: 315 m (1,033 ft)

Population (2025-12-31)
  - Total: 147
  - Density: 72.8/km^{2} (188/sq mi)
- Time zone: UTC+01:00 (CET)
  - Summer (DST): UTC+02:00 (CEST)
- Postal codes: 56379
- Dialling codes: 02604
- Vehicle registration: EMS, DIZ, GOH

Oberwies is a municipality in the district of Rhein-Lahn, in Rhineland-Palatinate, in western Germany. It belongs to the association community of Bad Ems-Nassau.
