= Bad Ems-Nassau =

Association of municipalities in Rhineland-Palatinate

- Verbandsgemeinde
- Location of Bad Ems-Nassau within Rhein-Lahn-Kreis district
- Interactive map of Bad Ems-Nassau
- Location within Germany Location within Rhineland-Palatinate
- Coordinates: 50°20′N 7°43′E
- Country: Germany
- State: Rhineland-Palatinate
- District: Rhein-Lahn-Kreis
- Seat: Bad Ems
- Subdivisions: 28 municipalities

Area
  - Total: 154.78 km^{2} (59.76 sq mi)

Population (2025-12-31)
  - Total: 28,933
  - Density: 186.93/km^{2} (484.15/sq mi)
- Time zone: UTC+01:00 (CET)
  - Summer (DST): UTC+02:00 (CEST)
- Website: www.vgben.de

Bad Ems-Nassau is a Verbandsgemeinde ("collective municipality") in the Rhein-Lahn-Kreis, in Rhineland-Palatinate, Germany. The seat of the Verbandsgemeinde is in Bad Ems. It was formed on 1 January 2019 by the merger of the former Verbandsgemeinden Bad Ems and Nassau.

The Verbandsgemeinde Bad Ems-Nassau consists of the following Ortsgemeinden ("local municipalities"):

1. Arzbach
2. Attenhausen
3. Bad Ems
4. Becheln
5. Dausenau
6. Dessighofen
7. Dienethal
8. Dornholzhausen
9. Fachbach
10. Frücht
11. Geisig
12. Hömberg
13. Kemmenau
14. Lollschied
15. Miellen
16. Misselberg
17. Nievern
18. Nassau
19. Obernhof
20. Oberwies
21. Pohl
22. Schweighausen
23. Seelbach
24. Singhofen
25. Sulzbach
26. Weinähr
27. Winden
28. Zimmerschied
