= Andreas Nick =

German politician

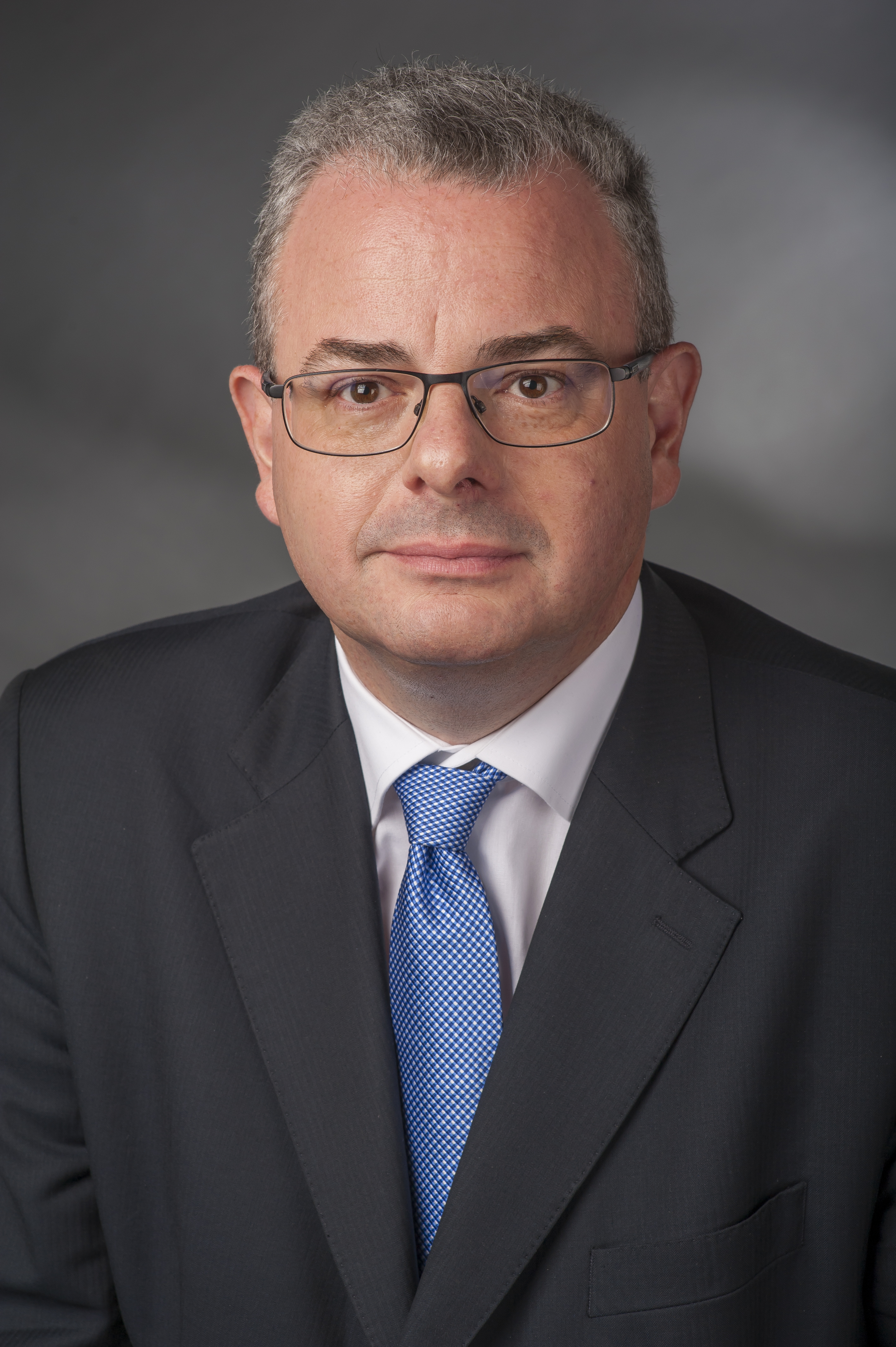
- Andreas Nick in 2014

Member of the Bundestag
- In office 2013–2021

Personal details
- Born: 26 April 1967 (age 59) Koblenz, West Germany (now Germany)
- Party: CDU
- Education: WHU – Otto Beisheim School of Management; ESC Lyon; Carnegie Mellon University; Paul H. Nitze School of Advanced International Studies

Andreas Nick (born 26 April 1967) is a former German politician of the Christian Democratic Union (CDU) who served as a member of the Bundestag from the state of Rhineland-Palatinate from 2013 until 2021.

== Early career ==
Before entering politics, Nick worked in corporate finance for Barclays/BZW, Credit Suisse First Boston and UBS both in Frankfurt and London. His most recent positions were as head of M&A at Sal. Oppenheim and as professor of corporate finance at the Frankfurt School of Finance & Management.

== Political career ==
Nick became member of the Bundestag in the 2013 German federal election. In parliament, he was a member of the Committee on Foreign Affairs, where he served as his parliamentary group's rapporteur on the Council of Europe and the United Nations as well as on relations to Turkey, Hungary and South America. In 2018, he also joined the Sub-Committee on the United Nations.

In addition to his parliamentary work, Nick chaired the German delegation to the Parliamentary Assembly of the Council of Europe (PACE) from 2018 to 2021. He also served as one of the Assembly's vice-presidents. He was also a member of the Committee on Political Affairs and Democracy (2018–2021), the Sub-Committee on the Middle East and the Arab World (2018–2021) and the Sub-Committee on relations with the OECD and the EBRD (2018-2019).

== Other activities ==
- American Institute for Contemporary German Studies (AICGS), Member of the Board of Trustees (2007–2013)

== Life after politics ==
In 2022, Nick became a partner in the international communications firm Brunswick in Berlin.

== Political positions ==
In 2019, Nick joined 14 members of his parliamentary group who, in an open letter, called for the party to rally around Angela Merkel and party chairwoman Annegret Kramp-Karrenbauer amid criticism voiced by conservatives Friedrich Merz and Roland Koch. Ahead of the CDU's 2021 leadership election, Nick joined other conservatives in calling on Merkel to stay on as chancellor until her term ends in 2021, dismissing calls for her to step down sooner and hand power to the party's next leader.

In September 2020, Nick was one of 15 members of his parliamentary group who joined Norbert Röttgen in writing an open letter to Minister of the Interior Horst Seehofer which called on Germany and other EU counties to take in 5,000 immigrants who were left without shelter after fires gutted the overcrowded Mória Reception and Identification Centre on the Greek island of Lesbos.
