= Dessighofen =

- Municipality
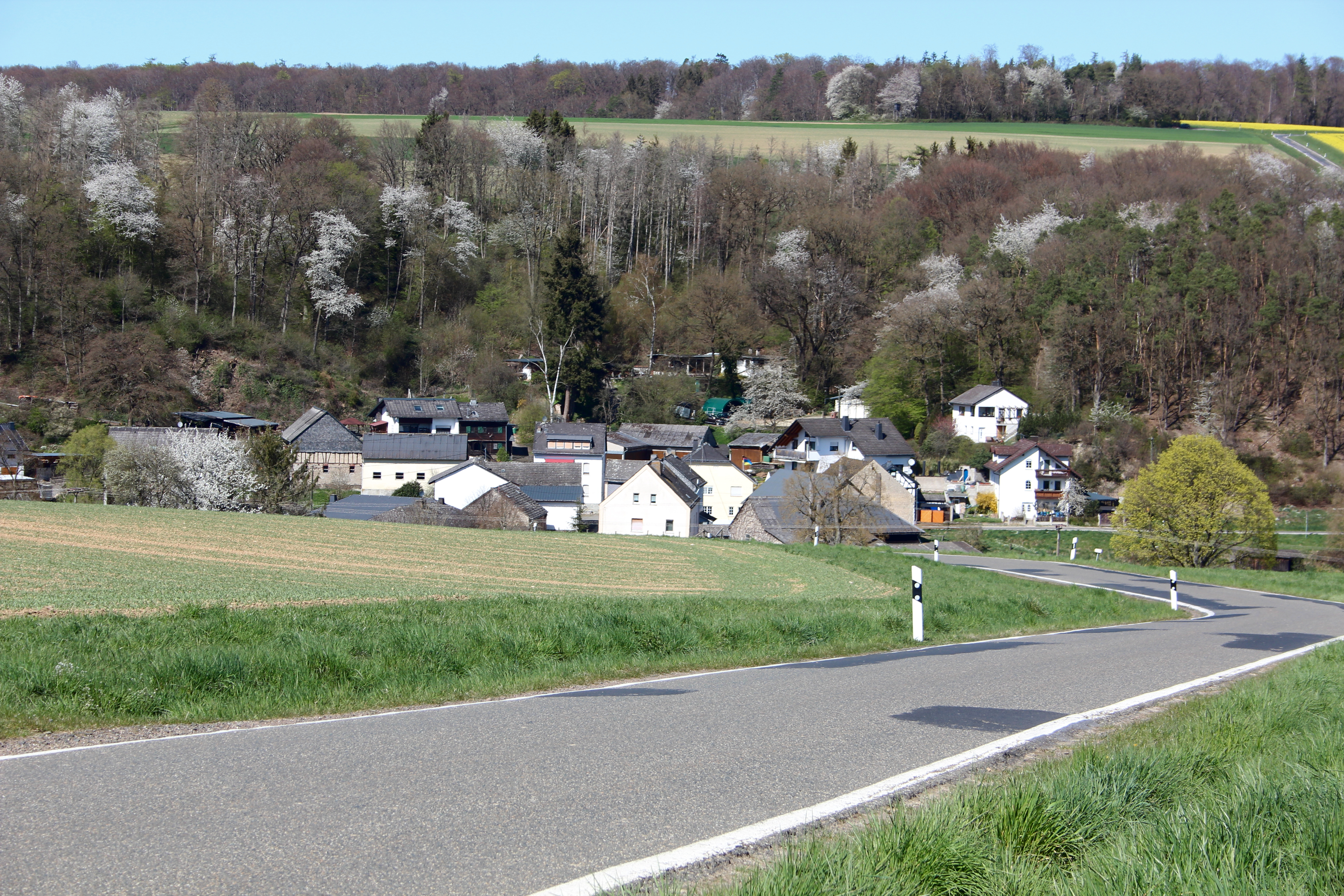

- Coat of arms

- Location of Dessighofen within Rhein-Lahn-Kreis district
- Interactive map of Dessighofen
- Location within Germany Location within Rhineland-Palatinate
- Coordinates: 50°15′28.74″N 7°46′18.72″E
- Country: Germany
- State: Rhineland-Palatinate
- District: Rhein-Lahn-Kreis
- Municipal assoc.: Bad Ems-Nassau

Government
  - Mayor (2023–24): Ronny Metzner

Area
  - Total: 3.57 km^{2} (1.38 sq mi)
- Elevation: 240 m (790 ft)

Population (2025-12-31)
  - Total: 199
  - Density: 55.7/km^{2} (144/sq mi)
- Time zone: UTC+01:00 (CET)
  - Summer (DST): UTC+02:00 (CEST)
- Postal codes: 56357
- Dialling codes: 06776
- Vehicle registration: EMS, DIZ, GOH

Dessighofen (German pronunciation: [dɛsɪçˈhoːfn̩]) is a municipality in the district of Rhein-Lahn, in Rhineland-Palatinate, in western Germany. It belongs to the association community of Bad Ems-Nassau.
