= Attenhausen =

- Municipality
- Coat of arms

- Location of Attenhausen within Rhein-Lahn-Kreis district
- Interactive map of Attenhausen
- Location within Germany Location within Rhineland-Palatinate
- Coordinates: 50°17′30.55″N 7°52′34.51″E
- Country: Germany
- State: Rhineland-Palatinate
- District: Rhein-Lahn-Kreis
- Municipal assoc.: Bad Ems-Nassau

Government
  - Mayor (2019–24): Volker Feldpausch

Area
  - Total: 5.85 km^{2} (2.26 sq mi)
- Elevation: 260 m (850 ft)

Population (2025-12-31)
  - Total: 408
  - Density: 69.7/km^{2} (181/sq mi)
- Time zone: UTC+01:00 (CET)
  - Summer (DST): UTC+02:00 (CEST)
- Postal codes: 56370
- Dialling codes: 02604
- Vehicle registration: EMS, DIZ, GOH

Attenhausen is a municipality in the district of Rhein-Lahn, in Rhineland-Palatinate, in western Germany. It belongs to the association community of Bad Ems-Nassau.
