= Seelbach, Rhein-Lahn =

Seelbach
- Municipality
- Coat of arms

- Location of Seelbach within Rhein-Lahn-Kreis district
- Interactive map of Seelbach
- Location within Germany Location within Rhineland-Palatinate
- Coordinates: 50°18′31″N 7°52′21″E
- Country: Germany
- State: Rhineland-Palatinate
- District: Rhein-Lahn-Kreis
- Municipal assoc.: Bad Ems-Nassau

Government
  - Mayor (2019–24): Jürgen Ludwig

Area
  - Total: 7.25 km^{2} (2.80 sq mi)
- Elevation: 300 m (980 ft)

Population (2025-12-31)
  - Total: 451
  - Density: 62.2/km^{2} (161/sq mi)
- Time zone: UTC+01:00 (CET)
  - Summer (DST): UTC+02:00 (CEST)
- Postal codes: 56377
- Dialling codes: 02604
- Vehicle registration: EMS, DIZ, GOH

Seelbach (German pronunciation: [ˈzeːlbax]) is a municipality in the district of Rhein-Lahn, in Rhineland-Palatinate, in western Germany. It belongs to the association community of Bad Ems-Nassau.
