= Obernhof =

- Municipality
- Coat of arms

- Location of Obernhof within Rhein-Lahn-Kreis district
- Interactive map of Obernhof
- Location within Germany Location within Rhineland-Palatinate
- Coordinates: 50°19′9″N 7°51′15″E
- Country: Germany
- State: Rhineland-Palatinate
- District: Rhein-Lahn-Kreis
- Municipal assoc.: Bad Ems-Nassau

Government
  - Mayor (2019–24): Karl Friedrich Merz

Area
  - Total: 3.85 km^{2} (1.49 sq mi)
- Elevation: 100 m (330 ft)

Population (2025-12-31)
  - Total: 387
  - Density: 101/km^{2} (260/sq mi)
- Time zone: UTC+01:00 (CET)
  - Summer (DST): UTC+02:00 (CEST)
- Postal codes: 56379
- Dialling codes: 02604
- Vehicle registration: EMS, DIZ, GOH
- Website: www.obernhof.de

Obernhof is a municipality in the district of Rhein-Lahn, in Rhineland-Palatinate, in western Germany. It belongs to the association community of Bad Ems-Nassau.

== Transport ==
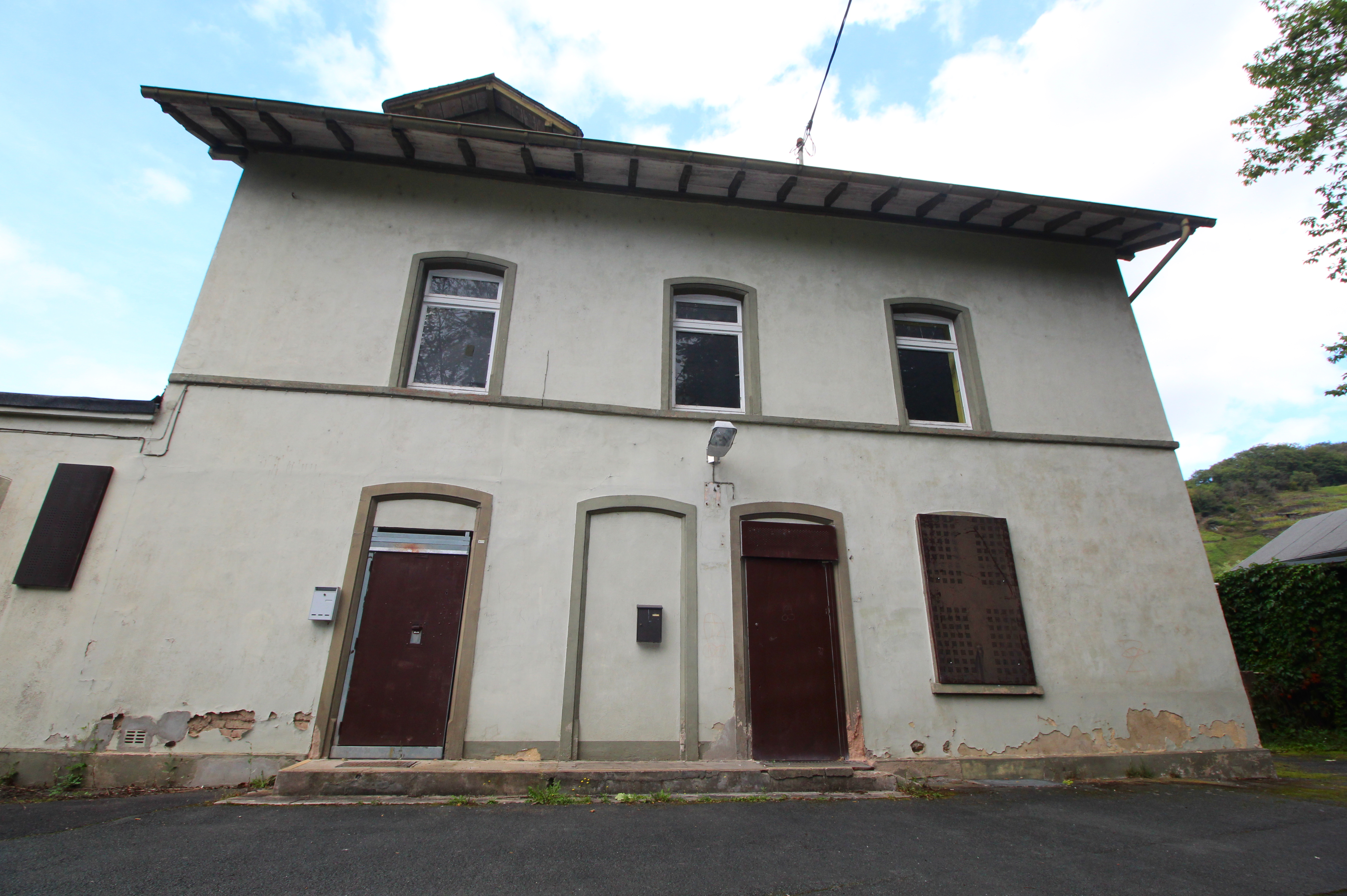
Obernhof train station

There's a train station of Lahn Valley Railway in Obernhof which is served by line RB23 (Limburg - Diez - Bad Ems - Koblenz - Andernach - Mayen), operated by section Lahn-Eifel-Bahn of Deutsche Bahn.
