= Dienethal =

- Municipality
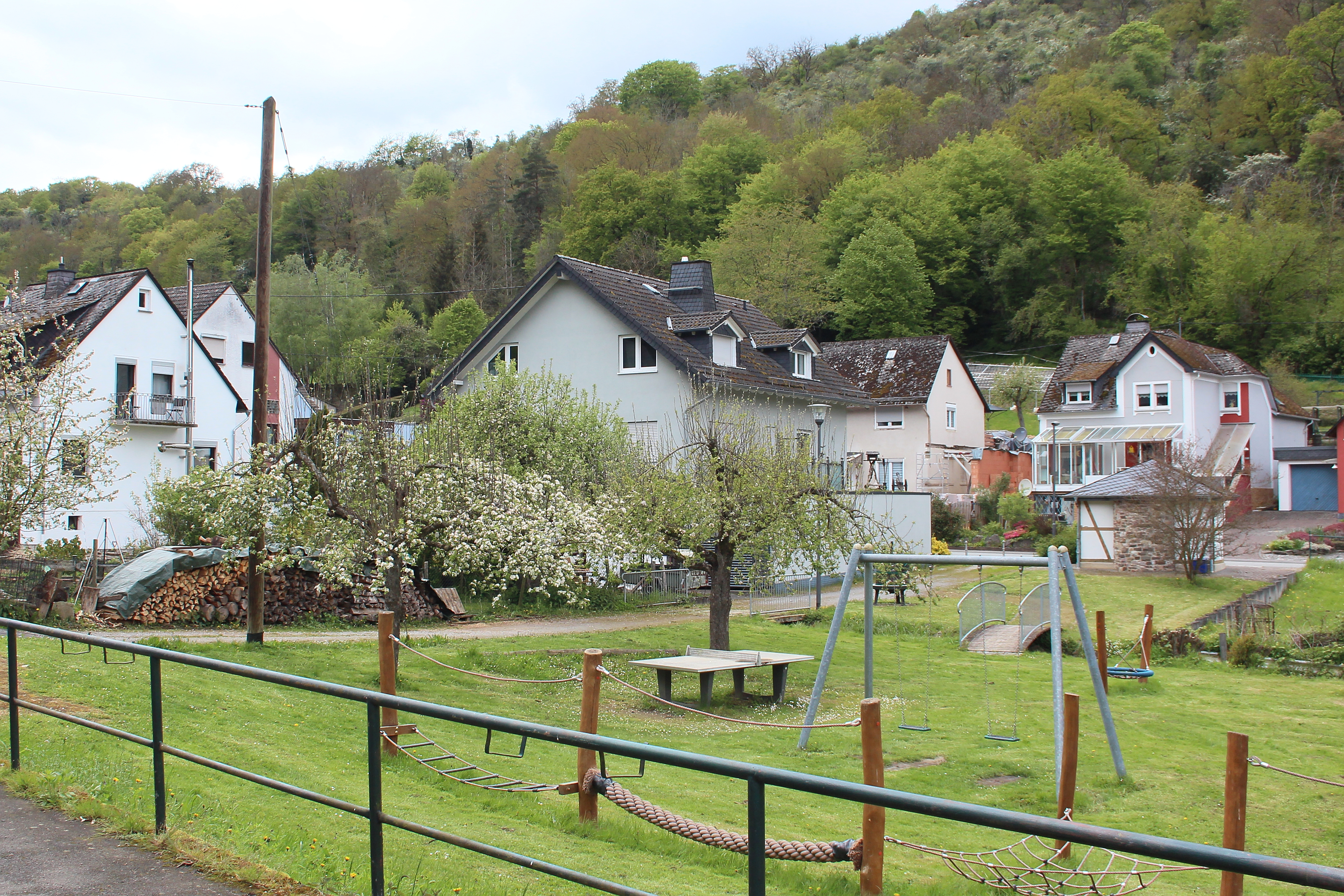

- Coat of arms

- Location of Dienethal within Rhein-Lahn-Kreis district
- Interactive map of Dienethal
- Location within Germany Location within Rhineland-Palatinate
- Coordinates: 50°18′15.8″N 7°46′40.82″E
- Country: Germany
- State: Rhineland-Palatinate
- District: Rhein-Lahn-Kreis
- Municipal assoc.: Bad Ems-Nassau

Government
  - Mayor (2019–24): Andreas Ritter

Area
  - Total: 1.39 km^{2} (0.54 sq mi)
- Elevation: 150 m (490 ft)

Population (2025-12-31)
  - Total: 216
  - Density: 155/km^{2} (402/sq mi)
- Time zone: UTC+01:00 (CET)
  - Summer (DST): UTC+02:00 (CEST)
- Postal codes: 56379
- Dialling codes: 02604
- Vehicle registration: EMS, DIZ, GOH
- Website: gemeinde-dienethal.de

Dienethal (German pronunciation: [ˈdiːnətaːl]) is a municipality in the district of Rhein-Lahn, in Rhineland-Palatinate, in western Germany. It belongs to the association community of Bad Ems-Nassau.
