= Koblenz (electoral district) =

Federal electoral district of Germany

198 Koblenz
- Electoral district for the Bundestag
- Koblenz in 2025
- State: Rhineland-Palatinate
- Population: 259,800 (2019)
- Electorate: 189,619 (2025)
- Major settlements: Koblenz; Lahnstein; Bendorf
- Area: 635.8 km^{2}

Current electoral district
- Created: 1949
- Party: CDU
- Member: Josef Oster
- Elected: 2017, 2021, 2025

Koblenz is an electoral constituency (German: Wahlkreis) represented in the Bundestag. It elects one member via first-past-the-post voting. Under the current constituency numbering system, it is designated as constituency 198. It is located in northern Rhineland-Palatinate, comprising the city of Koblenz, the eastern part of the Mayen-Koblenz district, and the western part of the Rhein-Lahn-Kreis district.

Koblenz was created for the inaugural 1949 federal election. Since 2017, it has been represented by Josef Oster of the Christian Democratic Union (CDU).

== Geography ==
Koblenz is located in northern Rhineland-Palatinate. As of the 2021 federal election, it comprises the independent city of Koblenz, the municipality of Bendorf and the Verbandsgemeinden of Rhein-Mosel, Vallendar, and Weißenthurm from the Mayen-Koblenz district, and, from the Rhein-Lahn-Kreis district, the municipality of Lahnstein, the Verbandsgemeinde of Loreley, and the municipalities of Arzbach, Bad Ems, Becheln, Dausenau, Fachbach, Frücht, Kemmenau, Miellen, and Nievern from the Bad Ems-Nassau Verbandsgemeinde.

== History ==
Koblenz was created in 1949. In the 1949 election, it was Rhineland-Palatinate constituency 3 in the numbering system. In the 1953 through 1976 elections, it was number 150. In the 1980 through 1998 elections, it was number 148. In the 2002 election, it was number 202. In the 2005 election, it was number 201. In the 2009 and 2013 elections, it was number 200. In the 2017 and 2021 elections, it was number 199. From the 2025 election, it has been number 198.

Originally, the constituency comprised the independent city of Koblenz and the districts of Landkreis Koblenz and Sankt Goar. In the 1972 through 1998 elections, it comprised the city of Koblenz, the municipality of Bendorf and the Verbandsgemeinden of Rhens, Untermosel, Vallendar, and Weißenthurm from the Mayen-Koblenz district, and the municipality of Boppard and the Verbandsgemeinden of Emmelshausen and Sankt Goar-Oberwesel from the Rhein-Hunsrück-Kreis district. It acquired its current borders in the 2002 election, although in 2014 the Verbandsgemeinde of Rhein-Mosel was created from Rhens and Untermosel, and the Verbandsgemeinde of Loreley absorbed Braubach.

Election	No.	Name	Borders
1949	3	Koblenz	Koblenz city; Landkreis Koblenz district; Sankt Goar district
1953	150	Koblenz	Koblenz city; Landkreis Koblenz district; Sankt Goar district
1957	150	Koblenz	Koblenz city; Landkreis Koblenz district; Sankt Goar district
1961	150	Koblenz	Koblenz city; Landkreis Koblenz district; Sankt Goar district
1965	150	Koblenz	Koblenz city; Landkreis Koblenz district; Sankt Goar district
1969	150	Koblenz	Koblenz city; Landkreis Koblenz district; Sankt Goar district
1972	150	Koblenz	Koblenz city; Mayen-Koblenz district (only Bendorf municipality and Rhens, Untermosel, Vallendar, and Weißenthurm Verbandsgemeinden); Rhein-Hunsrück-Kreis district (only Boppard municipality and Emmelshausen and Sankt Goar-Oberwesel Verbandsgemeinden)
1976	150	Koblenz	Koblenz city; Mayen-Koblenz district (only Bendorf municipality and Rhens, Untermosel, Vallendar, and Weißenthurm Verbandsgemeinden); Rhein-Hunsrück-Kreis district (only Boppard municipality and Emmelshausen and Sankt Goar-Oberwesel Verbandsgemeinden)
1980	148	Koblenz	Koblenz city; Mayen-Koblenz district (only Bendorf municipality and Rhens, Untermosel, Vallendar, and Weißenthurm Verbandsgemeinden); Rhein-Hunsrück-Kreis district (only Boppard municipality and Emmelshausen and Sankt Goar-Oberwesel Verbandsgemeinden)
1983	148	Koblenz	Koblenz city; Mayen-Koblenz district (only Bendorf municipality and Rhens, Untermosel, Vallendar, and Weißenthurm Verbandsgemeinden); Rhein-Hunsrück-Kreis district (only Boppard municipality and Emmelshausen and Sankt Goar-Oberwesel Verbandsgemeinden)
1987	148	Koblenz	Koblenz city; Mayen-Koblenz district (only Bendorf municipality and Rhens, Untermosel, Vallendar, and Weißenthurm Verbandsgemeinden); Rhein-Hunsrück-Kreis district (only Boppard municipality and Emmelshausen and Sankt Goar-Oberwesel Verbandsgemeinden)
1990	148	Koblenz	Koblenz city; Mayen-Koblenz district (only Bendorf municipality and Rhens, Untermosel, Vallendar, and Weißenthurm Verbandsgemeinden); Rhein-Hunsrück-Kreis district (only Boppard municipality and Emmelshausen and Sankt Goar-Oberwesel Verbandsgemeinden)
1994	148	Koblenz	Koblenz city; Mayen-Koblenz district (only Bendorf municipality and Rhens, Untermosel, Vallendar, and Weißenthurm Verbandsgemeinden); Rhein-Hunsrück-Kreis district (only Boppard municipality and Emmelshausen and Sankt Goar-Oberwesel Verbandsgemeinden)
1998	148	Koblenz	Koblenz city; Mayen-Koblenz district (only Bendorf municipality and Rhens, Untermosel, Vallendar, and Weißenthurm Verbandsgemeinden); Rhein-Hunsrück-Kreis district (only Boppard municipality and Emmelshausen and Sankt Goar-Oberwesel Verbandsgemeinden)
2002	202	Koblenz	Koblenz city; Mayen-Koblenz district (only Bendorf municipality and Rhein-Mosel, Vallendar, and Weißenthurm Verbandsgemeinden); Rhein-Lahn-Kreis district (only Lahnstein municipality and Loreley and Bad Ems-Nassau (only Arzbach, Bad Ems, Becheln, Dausenau, Fachbach, Frücht, Kemmenau, Miellen, and Nievern municipalities) Verbandsgemeinden)
2005	201	Koblenz	Koblenz city; Mayen-Koblenz district (only Bendorf municipality and Rhein-Mosel, Vallendar, and Weißenthurm Verbandsgemeinden); Rhein-Lahn-Kreis district (only Lahnstein municipality and Loreley and Bad Ems-Nassau (only Arzbach, Bad Ems, Becheln, Dausenau, Fachbach, Frücht, Kemmenau, Miellen, and Nievern municipalities) Verbandsgemeinden)
2009	200	Koblenz	Koblenz city; Mayen-Koblenz district (only Bendorf municipality and Rhein-Mosel, Vallendar, and Weißenthurm Verbandsgemeinden); Rhein-Lahn-Kreis district (only Lahnstein municipality and Loreley and Bad Ems-Nassau (only Arzbach, Bad Ems, Becheln, Dausenau, Fachbach, Frücht, Kemmenau, Miellen, and Nievern municipalities) Verbandsgemeinden)
2013	200	Koblenz	Koblenz city; Mayen-Koblenz district (only Bendorf municipality and Rhein-Mosel, Vallendar, and Weißenthurm Verbandsgemeinden); Rhein-Lahn-Kreis district (only Lahnstein municipality and Loreley and Bad Ems-Nassau (only Arzbach, Bad Ems, Becheln, Dausenau, Fachbach, Frücht, Kemmenau, Miellen, and Nievern municipalities) Verbandsgemeinden)
2017	199	Koblenz	Koblenz city; Mayen-Koblenz district (only Bendorf municipality and Rhein-Mosel, Vallendar, and Weißenthurm Verbandsgemeinden); Rhein-Lahn-Kreis district (only Lahnstein municipality and Loreley and Bad Ems-Nassau (only Arzbach, Bad Ems, Becheln, Dausenau, Fachbach, Frücht, Kemmenau, Miellen, and Nievern municipalities) Verbandsgemeinden)
2021	199	Koblenz	Koblenz city; Mayen-Koblenz district (only Bendorf municipality and Rhein-Mosel, Vallendar, and Weißenthurm Verbandsgemeinden); Rhein-Lahn-Kreis district (only Lahnstein municipality and Loreley and Bad Ems-Nassau (only Arzbach, Bad Ems, Becheln, Dausenau, Fachbach, Frücht, Kemmenau, Miellen, and Nievern municipalities) Verbandsgemeinden)
2025	198	Koblenz	Koblenz city; Mayen-Koblenz district (only Bendorf municipality and Rhein-Mosel, Vallendar, and Weißenthurm Verbandsgemeinden); Rhein-Lahn-Kreis district (only Lahnstein municipality and Loreley and Bad Ems-Nassau (only Arzbach, Bad Ems, Becheln, Dausenau, Fachbach, Frücht, Kemmenau, Miellen, and Nievern municipalities) Verbandsgemeinden)

== Members ==
The constituency has been held continuously by the Christian Democratic Union (CDU) since its creation. It was first represented by Karl Weber from 1949 to 1965. Egon Klepsch then served from 1965 to 1980. He was succeeded by Roswitha Verhülsdonk, who was representative until 1994. Karl-Heinz Scherhag served from 1994 to 2002. Michael Fuchs was representative from 2002 to 2017. Josef Oster succeeded him in 2017 and was re-elected in 2021 and 2025.

Election	Member	Party	%
1949	Karl Weber	CDU	57.5
1953	Karl Weber	CDU	62.1
1957	Karl Weber	CDU	61.7
1961	Karl Weber	CDU	56.8
1965	Egon Klepsch	CDU	56.8
1969	Egon Klepsch	CDU	52.1
1972	Egon Klepsch	CDU	49.4
1976	Egon Klepsch	CDU	52.3
1980	Roswitha Verhülsdonk	CDU	48.4
1983	Roswitha Verhülsdonk	CDU	54.8
1987	Roswitha Verhülsdonk	CDU	50.2
1990	Roswitha Verhülsdonk	CDU	48.8
1994	Karl-Heinz Scherhag	CDU	50.1
1998	Karl-Heinz Scherhag	CDU	46.2
2002	Michael Fuchs	CDU	44.1
2005	Michael Fuchs	CDU	45.4
2009	Michael Fuchs	CDU	44.1
2013	Michael Fuchs	CDU	48.0
2017	Josef Oster	CDU	41.3
2021	Josef Oster	CDU	31.7
2025	Josef Oster	CDU	35.7

== Election results ==
=== 2025 election ===
Federal election (2025): Koblenz
Notes:	Blue background denotes the winner of the electorate vote. Pink background denotes a candidate elected from their party list. Yellow background denotes an electorate win by a list member, or other incumbent. A ✓ or ✗ denotes status of any incumbent, win or lose respectively.						
Party	Candidate	Votes	%	±%	Party votes	%	±%
CDU	✓ Josef Oster	55,097	35.7	▲4.0	48,758	31.5	▲5.5
SPD	Thorsten Rudolph	37,659	24.4	▼5.5	30,233	19.5	▼9.8
AfD	Joachim Paul	24,836	16.1	▲9.4	25,417	16.4	▲9.3
Greens	Kim Theisen	15,001	9.7	▼2.7	18,026	11.6	▼2.8
Left	Oliver Antpöhler-Zwiernik	9,028	5.9	▲3.1	11,900	7.7	▲4.4
FDP	Jonathan Voss	4,703	3.0	▼4.6	7,405	4.8	▼6.4
BSW					6,181	4.0	New
FW	Dennis Graf	5,858	3.8	▼1.0	2,959	1.9	▼1.5
Tierschutzpartei					1,671	1.1	▼0.2
Volt	Dominik Rapp	2,110	1.4	▲0.9	1,123	0.7	▲0.3
PARTEI					803	0.5	▼0.4
ÖDP					208	0.1	▼0.1
BD					205	0.1	New
MLPD					61	<0.1	0.0
Informal votes		1,653			994		
Total valid votes		154,292			154,951		
Turnout		155,945	82.2	▲6.0			
CDU hold	Majority	18,525	11.3	▲9.5			

=== 2021 election ===
Federal election (2021): Koblenz
Notes:	Blue background denotes the winner of the electorate vote. Pink background denotes a candidate elected from their party list. Yellow background denotes an electorate win by a list member, or other incumbent. A ✓ or ✗ denotes status of any incumbent, win or lose respectively.						
Party	Candidate	Votes	%	±%	Party votes	%	±%
CDU	✓ Josef Oster	46,073	31.7	▼9.6	37,958	26.0	▼11.8
SPD	Thorsten Rudolf	43,416	29.9	▲1.2	42,817	29.3	▲5.5
Greens	Lena Etzkorn	17,980	12.4	▲6.2	21,007	14.4	▲6.5
FDP	Markus Wieseler	11,179	7.7	▲1.2	16,371	11.2	▲0.4
AfD	Carsten Dittmann	9,753	6.7	▼1.4	10,426	7.1	▼2.0
FW	Kathrin Laymann	7,028	4.8	▲3.1	4,928	3.4	▲2.3
Left	Oliver Antpöhler-Zwiernek	4,054	2.8	▼2.4	4,804	3.3	▼3.6
Tierschutzpartei					1,818	1.2	
PARTEI	Michael Brüggemann	2,354	1.6	▲0.5	1,401	1.0	▼0.2
dieBasis	Mark Schneider	1,758	1.2		1,497	1.0	
Pirates					725	0.5	0.0
Volt	Roman Snegur	694	0.5		642	0.4	
Team Todenhöfer					598	0.4	
ÖDP	Carolin Schmidt	614	0.4		319	0.2	0.0
Independent	Alexandra Sayn	409	0.3				
V-Partei3					156	0.1	▼0.1
Humanists					137	0.1	
DiB					118	0.1	
NPD					99	0.1	▼0.1
LKR					56	0.0	
MLPD					26	0.0	0.0
Informal votes		1,815			1,224		
Total valid votes		145,312			145,903		
Turnout		147,127	76.2	▼0.5			
CDU hold	Majority	2,657	1.8	▼10.8			

=== 2017 election ===
Federal election (2017): Koblenz
Notes:	Blue background denotes the winner of the electorate vote. Pink background denotes a candidate elected from their party list. Yellow background denotes an electorate win by a list member, or other incumbent. A ✓ or ✗ denotes status of any incumbent, win or lose respectively.						
Party	Candidate	Votes	%	±%	Party votes	%	±%
CDU	Josef Oster	61,594	41.3	▼6.7	56,616	37.8	▼7.2
SPD	Detlev Pilger	42,777	28.7	▼2.1	35,679	23.8	▼3.3
AfD	Thomas Damson	12,153	8.2		13,701	9.2	▲4.5
FDP	Florian Glock	9,732	6.5	▲3.8	16,152	10.8	▲5.4
Greens	Patrick Zwiernik	9,273	6.2	▼1.8	11,862	7.9	▲0.2
Left	Ulrich Lenz	7,693	5.2	▲0.2	10,332	6.9	▲1.7
FW	Stefan Scheer	2,623	1.8	▼0.9	1,627	1.1	▼0.1
PARTEI	Andreas Werner Müller	1,723	1.2		1,715	1.1	
Pirates	Marieluise Charlotte Salm	1,058	0.7	▼2.1	741	0.5	▼1.7
Independent	Jan-Peter Babnik	383	0.3				
V-Partei³					370	0.2	
ÖDP					302	0.2	0.0
NPD					252	0.2	▼0.5
BGE					242	0.2	
MLPD					38	0.0	0.0
Informal votes		2,144			1,524		
Total valid votes		149,009			149,629		
Turnout		151,153	76.7	▲4.6			
CDU hold	Majority	18,817	12.6	▼4.6			

=== 2013 election ===
Federal election (2013): Koblenz
Notes:	Blue background denotes the winner of the electorate vote. Pink background denotes a candidate elected from their party list. Yellow background denotes an electorate win by a list member, or other incumbent. A ✓ or ✗ denotes status of any incumbent, win or lose respectively.						
Party	Candidate	Votes	%	±%	Party votes	%	±%
CDU	✓ Michael Fuchs	67,046	48.0	▲3.9	63,427	45.0	▲9.0
SPD	Detlev Pilger	43,094	30.8	▲2.8	38,221	27.1	▲3.3
Greens	Josef Winkler	11,184	8.0	▼1.7	10,853	7.7	▼2.4
Left	Bettina Lau	6,901	4.9	▼2.4	7,358	5.2	▼3.0
AfD					6,625	4.7	
Pirates	Heiko Müller	3,953	2.8		3,073	2.2	▲0.2
FDP	Martin Kaschny	3,772	2.7	▼6.9	7,595	5.4	▼12.0
FW	Stephan Wefelscheid	3,745	2.7		1,714	1.2	
NPD					938	0.7	▼0.2
ÖDP					324	0.2	0.0
PRO					282	0.2	
Party of Reason					248	0.2	
REP					176	0.1	▼0.2
MLPD					29	0.0	0.0
Informal votes		3,193			2,025		
Total valid votes		139,695			140,863		
Turnout		142,888	72.1	▲1.5			
CDU hold	Majority	23,952	17.2	▲1.2			

=== 2009 election ===
Federal election (2009): Koblenz
Notes:	Blue background denotes the winner of the electorate vote. Pink background denotes a candidate elected from their party list. Yellow background denotes an electorate win by a list member, or other incumbent. A ✓ or ✗ denotes status of any incumbent, win or lose respectively.						
Party	Candidate	Votes	%	±%	Party votes	%	±%
CDU	✓ Michael Fuchs	59,853	44.1	▼1.3	49,065	36.0	▼2.1
SPD	Ursula Mogg	38,080	28.1	▼11.2	32,414	23.8	▼11.3
Greens	Josef Winkler	13,222	9.7	▲4.3	13,732	10.1	▲2.6
FDP	Markus Falk	13,084	9.6	▲5.0	23,679	17.4	▲5.4
Left	Wolfgang Ferner	9,935	7.3	▲3.1	11,239	8.2	▲3.4
Pirates					2,690	2.0	
NPD	Sven Lobeck	1,483	1.1	0.0	1,188	0.9	▼0.1
FAMILIE					1,118	0.8	0.0
REP					432	0.3	▼0.1
ÖDP					324	0.2	
PBC					227	0.2	▼0.1
DVU					98	0.1	
MLPD					31	0.0	0.0
Informal votes		3,133			2,553		
Total valid votes		135,657			136,237		
Turnout		138,790	70.6	▼6.9			
CDU hold	Majority	21,773	16.0	▲9.8			

=== 2005 election ===
Federal election (2005):Koblenz
Notes:	Blue background denotes the winner of the electorate vote. Pink background denotes a candidate elected from their party list. Yellow background denotes an electorate win by a list member, or other incumbent. A ✓ or ✗ denotes status of any incumbent, win or lose respectively.						
Party	Candidate	Votes	%	±%	Party votes	%	±%
CDU	✓ Michael Fuchs	67,876	45.4	▲1.3	57,205	38.1	▼2.8
SPD	Ursula Mogg	58,645	39.2	▼3.9	52,665	35.1	▼3.8
Greens	Josef Winkler	8,120	5.4	▲0.5	11,171	7.4	▼0.6
FDP	Peter Kaiser	6,888	4.6	▼1.7	17,953	12.0	▲3.0
Left	Heinrich Schirmer	6,287	4.2	▲3.2	7,227	4.8	▲3.8
NPD	Karl-Heinz Galeazzi-Szymczakowski	1,624	1.1		1,431	1.0	▲0.7
Familie					1,272	0.8	
REP					593	0.4	0.0
PBC					396	0.3	▲0.1
MLPD					86	0.1	
Informal votes		2,585			2,026		
Total valid votes		149,440			149,999		
Turnout		152,025	77.6	▼1.6			
CDU hold	Majority	9,231	6.2				
