= Bad Ems (Verbandsgemeinde) =

Coordinates: 50.338°N 7.711°E

Bad Ems is a former Verbandsgemeinde ("collective municipality") in the Rhein-Lahn-Kreis, in Rhineland-Palatinate, Germany. In January 2019 it was merged into the new Verbandsgemeinde Bad Ems-Nassau. Its seat was in Bad Ems.

The Verbandsgemeinde Bad Ems consisted of the following Ortsgemeinden ("local municipalities"):

1. Arzbach
2. Bad Ems
3. Becheln
4. Dausenau
5. Fachbach
6. Frücht
7. Kemmenau
8. Miellen
9. Nievern
