= Josef Oster =

German politician

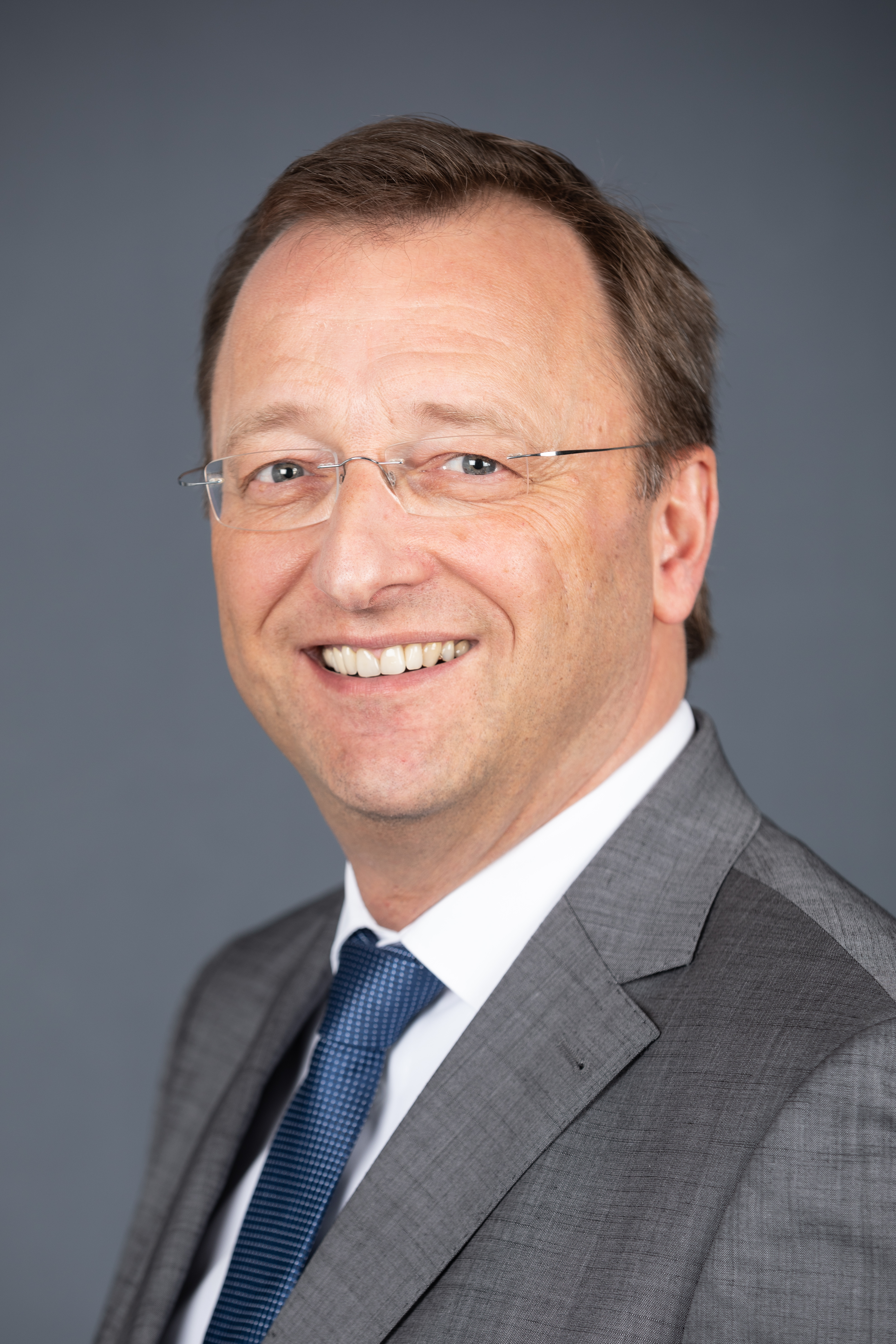
- Josef Oster in 2020

Member of the Bundestag
- Incumbent
- Assumed office 2017
- Preceded by: Michael Fuchs

Personal details
- Born: 4 January 1971 (age 55) Zell (Mosel), West Germany (now Germany)
- Party: CDU

Josef Oster (born 4 January 1971) is a German politician of the Christian Democratic Union (CDU) who has been serving as a member of the Bundestag from the state of Rhineland-Palatinate since 2017.

== Political career ==
Oster became a member of the Bundestag after the 2017 German federal election, representing the Koblenz district. He is a member of the Committee on Petitions and the Committee on Internal Affairs. In that capacity, he serves as his parliamentary group's rapporteur on foreign deployments of the Federal Police.

In addition to his committee assignments, Oster is part of the Parliamentary Friendship Group for the States of East Africa, which is in charge of maintaining inter-parliamentary relations with Ethiopia, Burundi, Djibouti, Eritrea, Kenya, Rwanda, Somalia, Sudan and Uganda.
