= Nievern =

- Municipality
- Coat of arms

- Location of Nievern within Rhein-Lahn-Kreis district
- Interactive map of Nievern
- Location within Germany Location within Rhineland-Palatinate
- Coordinates: 50°20′N 7°41′E
- Country: Germany
- State: Rhineland-Palatinate
- District: Rhein-Lahn-Kreis
- Municipal assoc.: Bad Ems-Nassau

Government
  - Mayor (2019–24): Lutz Zaun (CDU)

Area
  - Total: 4.29 km^{2} (1.66 sq mi)
- Elevation: 90 m (300 ft)

Population (2025-12-31)
  - Total: 1,049
  - Density: 245/km^{2} (633/sq mi)
- Time zone: UTC+01:00 (CET)
  - Summer (DST): UTC+02:00 (CEST)
- Postal codes: 56132
- Dialling codes: 02603
- Vehicle registration: EMS, DIZ, GOH
- Website: www.nievern.de

Nievern is a municipality in the district of Rhein-Lahn, in Rhineland-Palatinate, in western Germany. It belongs to the association community of Bad Ems-Nassau.

== Geography ==
The municipality is located on the south shore of the river Lahn, at Kilometre 128, rising up to the hills of the Taunus mountains. The residential and commercial district of Maaracker, about 1 km to the east, joins directly with the neighbouring town and district capital of Bad Ems. It is then clockwise surrounded by the neighbouring municipalities of Frücht, Miellen and Fachbach on the opposite shore of the Lahn river. Bigger towns nearby include Lahnstein, where the Lahn meets the river Rhine, the catholic Bishopric of Limburg an der Lahn, the old seat of the House of Nassau, Nassau an der Lahn, Montabaur on the ICE high-speed railway between Cologne and Frankfurt am Main and the A3 Autobahn, and the city of Koblenz as the closest regional centre.

== Traffic and infrastructure ==
Nievern is connected to the State Road B260 running up the Lahn valley from Lahnstein to Wiesbaden via a bridge crossing the river. Other roads connect to Bad Ems, Frücht and Miellen. The Lahn Valley cycle way runs through Fachbach on the opposite shore of the river. The Lahn Valley Railway, operated by Deutsche Bahn, section Lahn-Eifel-Bahn, passes through the village and operates a stop in the centre of the municipality.

== History ==
The area of the modern municipality was incorporated into the Roman Empire by the first century AD and protected by the fortified frontier of the limes, which ran across the Westerwald and Taunus mountains and crossed the Lahn river, the boundary between those, just 5 km to the east in the modern town centre of Bad Ems.

Nievern was first mentioned 1275 AD, although settlement has been suggested from around 900. It was owned by the family of the Von der Leyen since 1629 and then by the Duchy of Nassau since 1806.

During the Second World War, the nearby ironwork Nieverner Hütte, located on an island in the river, served as a production facility for munitions. Bombing raids on the factory and the nearby strategically important cities of Koblenz, Lahnstein and Nassau caused minor destruction and casualties due to accidental collateral damages in the village. Shortly before the municipality was liberated by the U.S. Army on 25 March 1945, the Wehrmacht destroyed both the rail bridge connecting the Lahntalbahn to the ironwork and the first road bridge connecting Nievern with Fachbach dating from 1928. The latter was rebuilt shortly after the war.

== Sons and Daughters of the Town ==
- Marcellus de Niveriis, O.F.M. (died between 1460 and 1462). He was a Franciscan friar and priest, became a swindler and adventurer and then became the 26th Bishop of Skálholt in Iceland. He never went to Iceland. He stayed in Denmark and became the Chancellor as well as the Royal Councilor under King Christian I of Denmark and Norway. He tried to get himself promoted to the Archbishop of Nidaros in Norway but lost to Heinrich Kalteisen, O.P., a Dominican who happened to be from nearby Koblenz.
