= Mülheim-Kärlich =

- Town
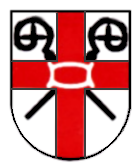
- Coat of arms

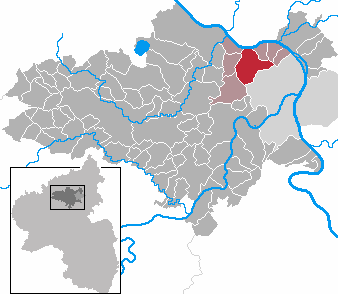
- Location of Mülheim-Kärlich within Mayen-Koblenz district
- Interactive map of Mülheim-Kärlich
- Location within Germany Location within Rhineland-Palatinate
- Coordinates: 50°23′13″N 7°29′43″E
- Country: Germany
- State: Rhineland-Palatinate
- District: Mayen-Koblenz
- Municipal assoc.: Weißenthurm
- Subdivisions: 4

Government
  - Mayor (2024–29): Gerd Harner (FW)

Area
  - Total: 16.42 km^{2} (6.34 sq mi)
- Elevation: 76 m (249 ft)

Population (2025-12-31)
  - Total: 11,071
  - Density: 674.2/km^{2} (1,746/sq mi)
- Time zone: UTC+01:00 (CET)
  - Summer (DST): UTC+02:00 (CEST)
- Postal codes: 56218
- Dialling codes: 02630
- Vehicle registration: MYK
- Website: www.muelheim-kaerlich.de

Mülheim-Kärlich (German pronunciation: [ˈmyːlhaɪm ˈkɛːɐ̯lɪç]) is a town in the district Mayen-Koblenz, in Rhineland-Palatinate, Germany. It is part of the Verbandsgemeinde ("collective municipality") Weißenthurm. It is situated west of Koblenz, a few kilometers from the Rhine. It is the site of the closed Mülheim-Kärlich Nuclear Power Plant.

In the 17th and 18th century, Schloss Kärlich was a favourite summer palace and hunting lodge of the Prince-Electors and Archbishops of Trier.

== Notable people ==
- Ludwig Becker (1855–1940), church architect and builder; constructed the new Parish Church of St. Mauritius 1931–1932
- Ludwig Kaas (1881–1952), Chairman of the Centre Party; 1910 chaplain in Kärlich
- Lucas Luhr (1979-), professional racing driver
