= Bassenheim =

- Municipality
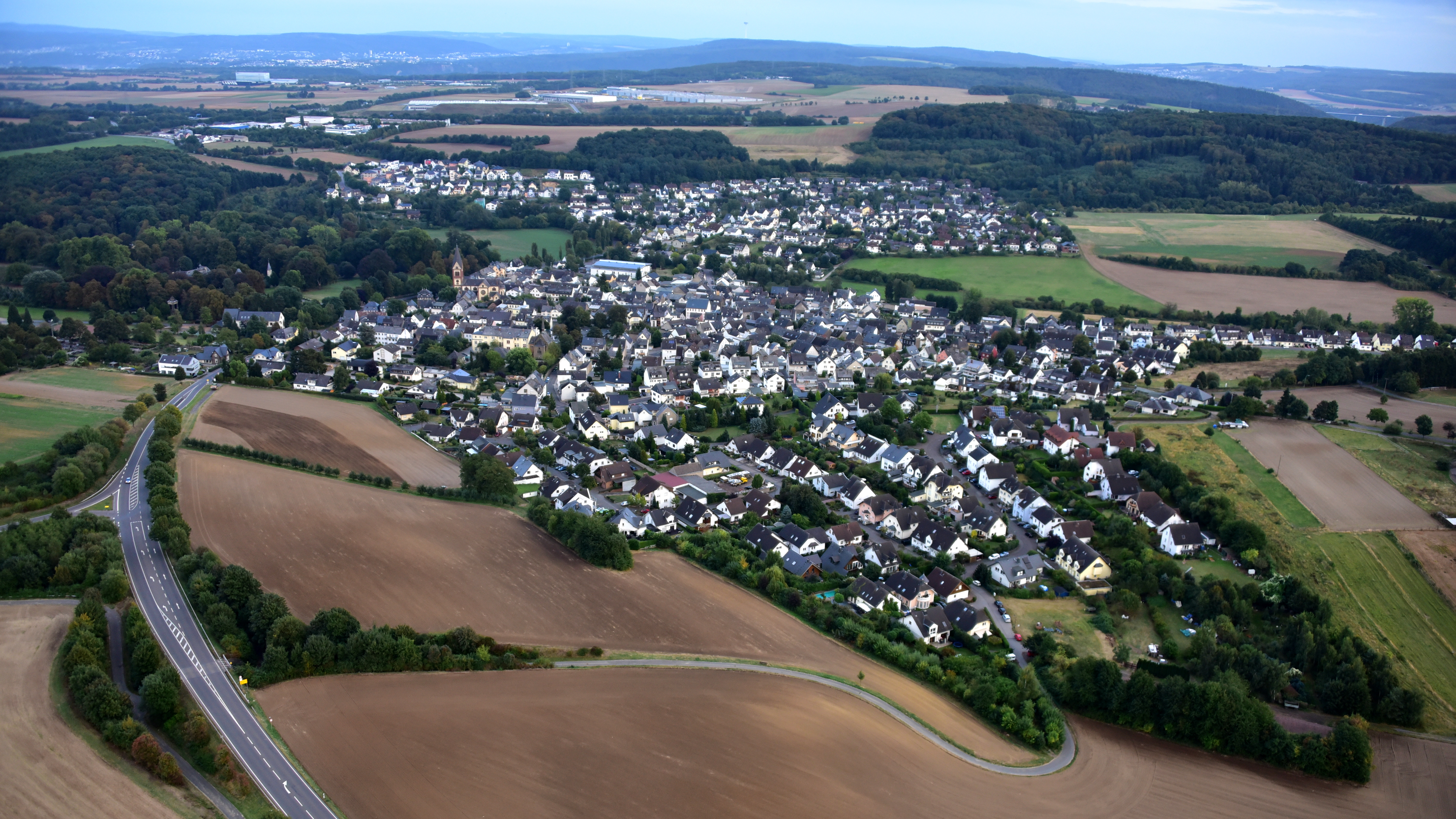
- Aerial view

- Coat of arms

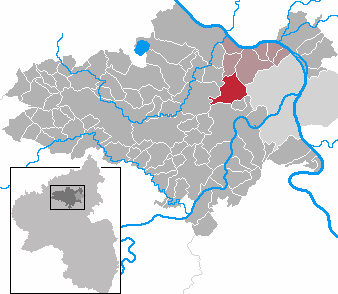
- Location of Bassenheim within Mayen-Koblenz district
- Interactive map of Bassenheim
- Location within Germany Location within Rhineland-Palatinate
- Coordinates: 50°21′35″N 07°27′42″E
- Country: Germany
- State: Rhineland-Palatinate
- District: Mayen-Koblenz
- Municipal assoc.: Weißenthurm

Government
  - Mayor (2019–24): Natalja Kronenberg (CDU)

Area
  - Total: 14.76 km^{2} (5.70 sq mi)
- Elevation: 69 m (226 ft)

Population (2025-12-31)
  - Total: 3,017
  - Density: 204.4/km^{2} (529.4/sq mi)
- Time zone: UTC+01:00 (CET)
  - Summer (DST): UTC+02:00 (CEST)
- Postal codes: 56220
- Dialling codes: 02625
- Vehicle registration: MYK
- Website: www.bassenheim.de

Bassenheim (German pronunciation: [ˈbasn̩haɪm]) is a municipality in the district Mayen-Koblenz, in Rhineland-Palatinate, Germany. It is part of the Verbandsgemeinde ("collective municipality") Weißenthurm. It is situated 10 kilometres (6.2 miles) away from Koblenz. The municipal council consists of 20 people, 13 of them from the CDU and 7 from the SPD.

== International relations ==
Bassenheim is twinned with:

- Pasym, Poland (originally a German town with a near-identical name, Passenheim)

== Transport ==
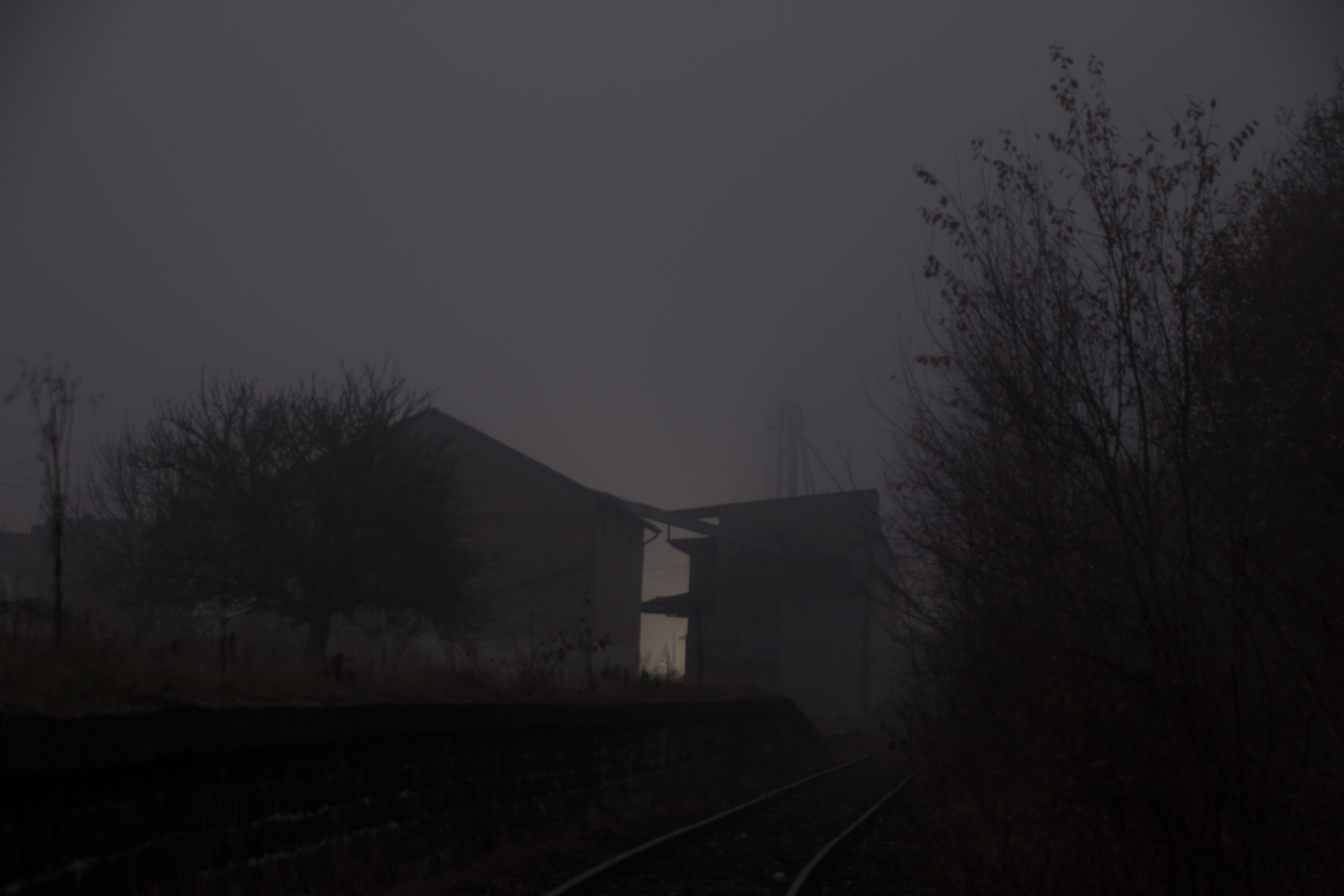
Former Bassenheim station

Bassenheim had a stop on the Koblenz-Lützel - Mayen Ost railway line, which is out of service today.
