= Pilger =

Pilger may refer to:

== People with the surname ==
- Detlev Pilger, German politician
- John Pilger, Australian journalist
- Robert Knud Friedrich Pilger, German botanist
- Zoe Pilger, British author and art critic

== Places ==
- Pilger, Nebraska, United States
- Pilger, Saskatchewan, Canada
