= Kettig =

- Municipality
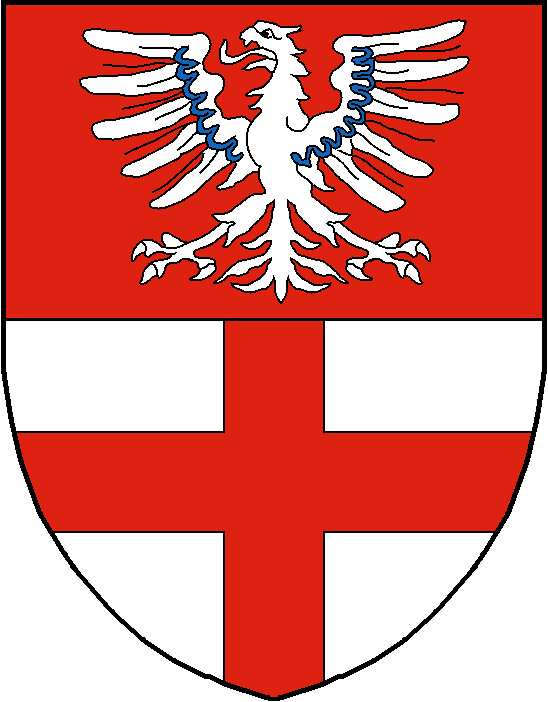
- Coat of arms

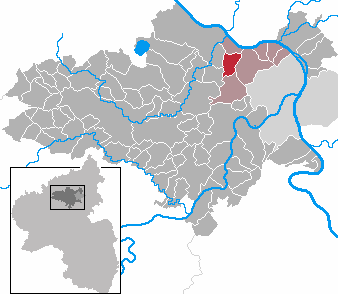
- Location of Kettig within Mayen-Koblenz district
- Interactive map of Kettig
- Location within Germany Location within Rhineland-Palatinate
- Coordinates: 50°24′N 7°28′E
- Country: Germany
- State: Rhineland-Palatinate
- District: Mayen-Koblenz
- Municipal assoc.: Weißenthurm

Government
  - Mayor (2019–24): Peter Moskopp

Area
  - Total: 7.76 km^{2} (3.00 sq mi)
- Elevation: 67 m (220 ft)

Population (2025-12-31)
  - Total: 3,494
  - Density: 450/km^{2} (1,170/sq mi)
- Time zone: UTC+01:00 (CET)
  - Summer (DST): UTC+02:00 (CEST)
- Postal codes: 56220
- Dialling codes: 02637
- Vehicle registration: MYK
- Website: www.gemeinde-kettig.de

Kettig (German pronunciation: [ˈkɛtɪç]) is a municipality in the district of Mayen-Koblenz in Rhineland-Palatinate, western Germany.
