= Karl-Heinz Scherhag =

German politician (1936–2015)

Member of the Bundestag for Koblenz
- In office 10 November 1994 – 17 October 2017
- Constituency: Koblenz (electoral district)

Personal details
- Born: 6 February 1936 Koblenz, Rhineland-Palatinate, Nazi Germany
- Died: 14 February 2015 (aged 79) Koblenz, Rhineland-Palatinate
- Party: Christian Democratic Union

Karl-Heinz Scherhag (6 February 1936 - 14 February 2015) was a German politician who served in the Bundestag from 1994 to 2002. He was member of the CDU.

== Life ==
In 1974 Karl-Heinz Scherhag became a member of the General Assembly of the Koblenz Chamber of Crafts. He was its president from 1988 to 2009 (honorary president from 2009 until his death).

== Political career ==
Karl-Heinz Scherhag joined the CDU in 1960. He belonged for 16 Years to the City council of Koblenz. At the 2002 German federal election he get a mandate for the Bundestag. During his tenure, he sat on several committees of the German Bundestag, including the Main and Finance Committee and the Construction and Economic Development Committee. As a member of the Bundestag, he was heavily involved in the creation of the "Meister-BaFöG" law and the Crafts Code.

== Honors ==
- Handwerkszeichen in Gold des ZDH (1996)
- Große Bundesverdienstkreuz (2002)
- Ehrenring der HwK Koblenz (2009)
