= Mülheim-Kärlich Nuclear Power Plant =

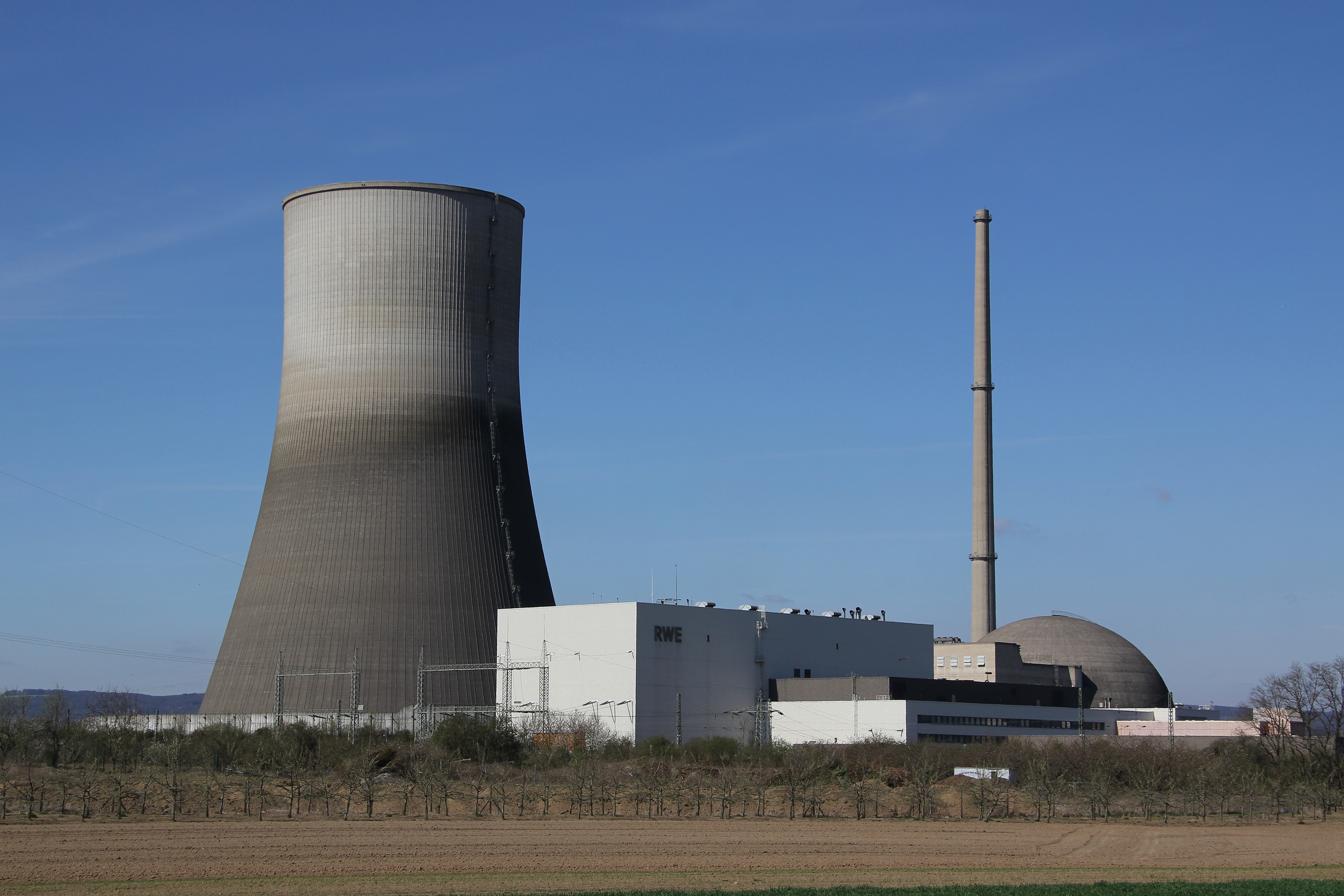
- The Mülheim-Kärlich NPP
- Country: Germany
- Coordinates: 50°24′29″N 7°29′24″E
- Status: Decommissioned
- Construction began: 1975
- Commission date: August 1, 1987
- Decommission date: September 9, 1988
- Operator: RWE
- Cooling towers: 1
- Cooling source: Rhine River

Power generation
- Units decommissioned: 1 x 1308 MW

External links
- Website: Site c/o RWE
- Commons: Related media on Commons

The Mülheim-Kärlich nuclear power plant is a nuclear power station located near the town of Mülheim-Kärlich in Rhineland-Palatinate, Germany. It lies on the Rhine, about 10 km northwest of the city of Koblenz. The power station was operated by Société Luxembourgeoise de Centrales Nucléaires, a daughter company of RWE. It was the only nuclear power plant in the state of Rhineland-Palatinate after it was completed in 1986, however, due to problems with the building permit it only operated for 3 years and was taken offline in 1988. Subsequent attempts to bring the plant online continued until 1998 when the supreme court ruled for it to never be restarted.

== History ==
The plant was built from 1975 to 1986 and potential problems were apparent before construction was completed. There were complaints from municipalities and delays from various suppliers. It was revealed that the construction site lay in an earthquake-prone basin, the Neuwieder Becken. Due to earthquake concerns, the location was moved 70 meters from where it had been originally planned.

After just three years of operation it had to be taken out of operation indefinitely, with resumption of operations contingent on a judicial decision. New requirements for a building permit were drafted and the licensing process essentially had to start over completely in order for the plant to come back online. The government of Rhineland-Palatinate granted the plant a building permit, but it was rescinded by the higher administrative court in Koblenz in 1991 and 1995. The decision was confirmed by the federal administrative court in Berlin in 1998 in the final legal battle.

The plant began the decommissioning process in 2001 and management was transferred from RWE. The removal of the nuclear fuel happened one year later. The removal of the plant and the cooling tower itself were postponed multiple times; both were still standing in 2018. Demolition of the cooling tower took place on August 9, 2019, at 15.38 local time.

== Technical data ==
- Owner: Société Luxembourgeoise de Centrales Nucléaires (RWE subsidiary)
- Operator: RWE Power AG
- Building firm: ABB
- Type: Pressurized water reactor
- Rated output: 1,308 MWe
- First current production: 14. March 1986
- Storage capacity: 362 fuel elements
- Construction costs: 7 billion DM (3.58 billion euro)
- Height of the cooling tower: 162 m
- Height of the chimney: 161.5 m

== Gallery ==
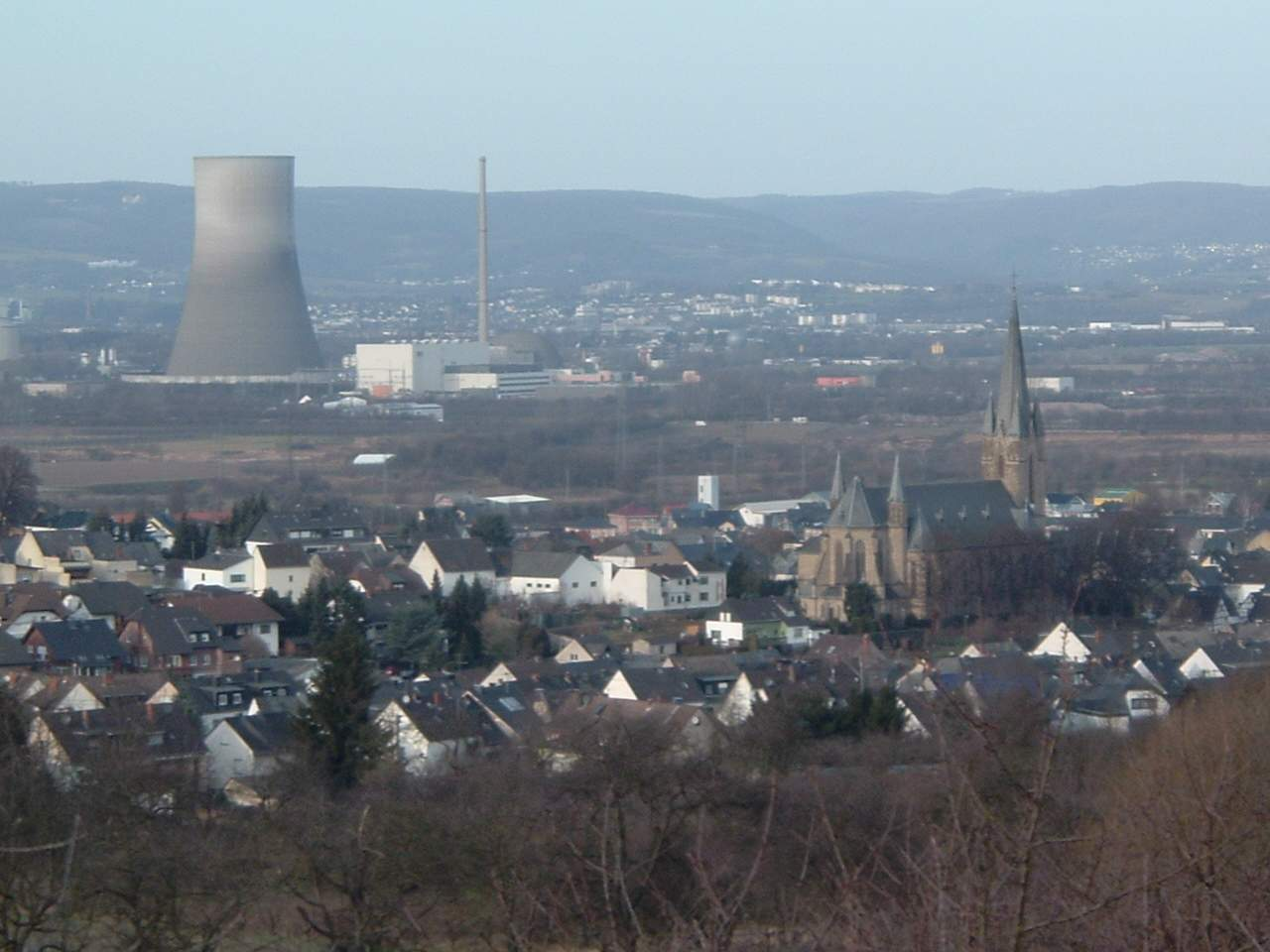
The Mülheim-Kärlich town and the power station

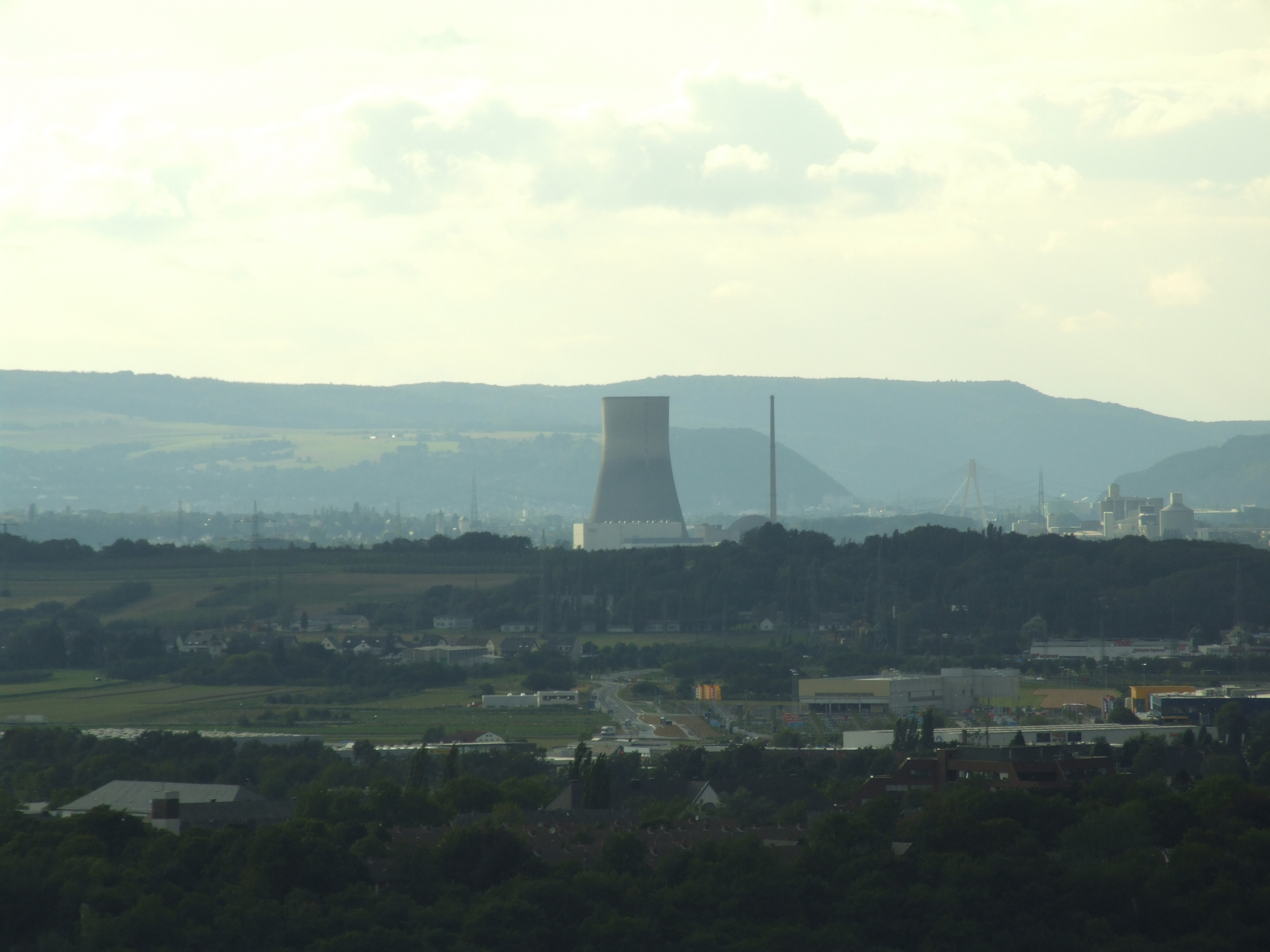
The power station seen from the Festung Ehrenbreitstein castle

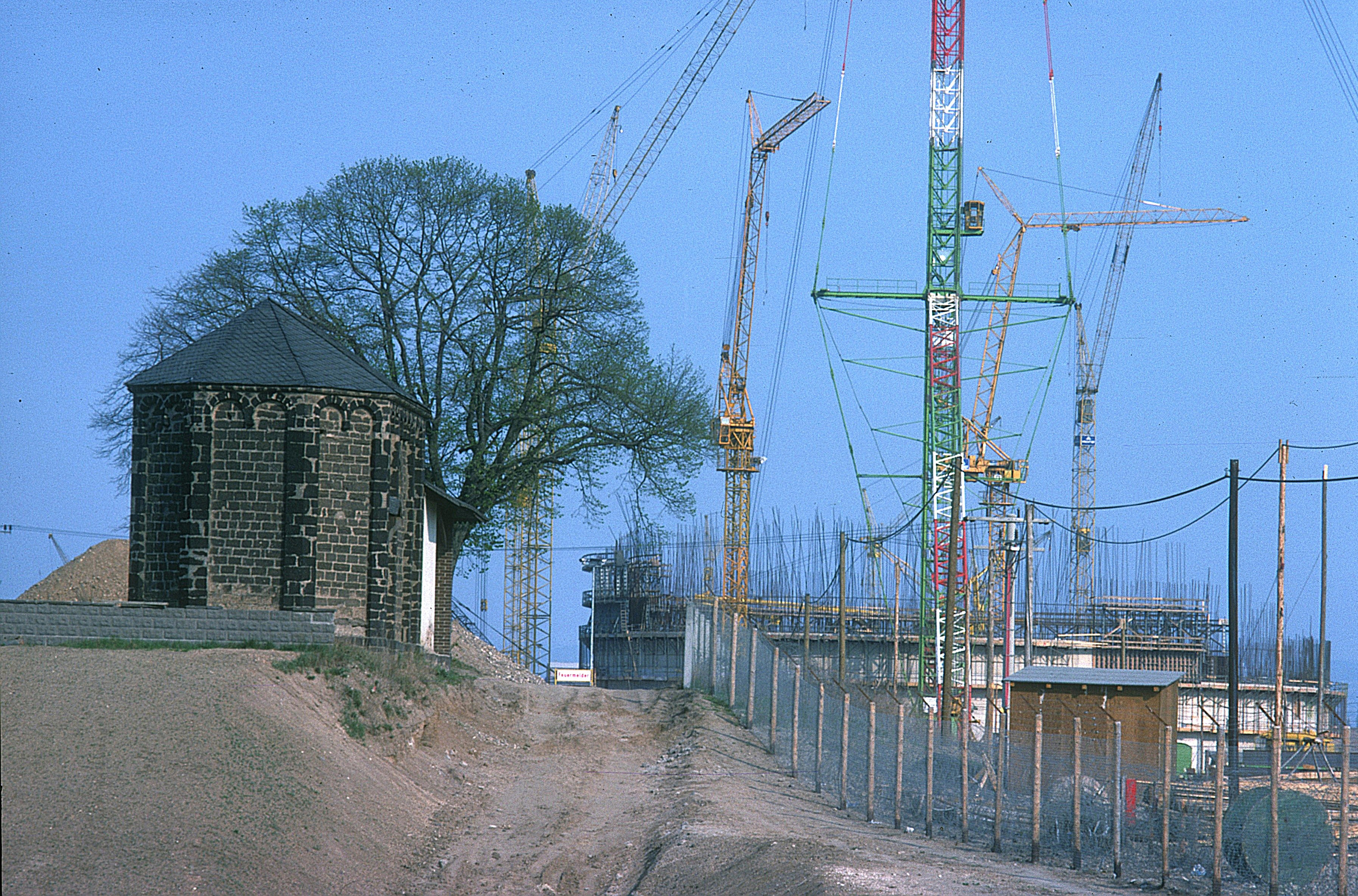
Chapel at the construction site 1976

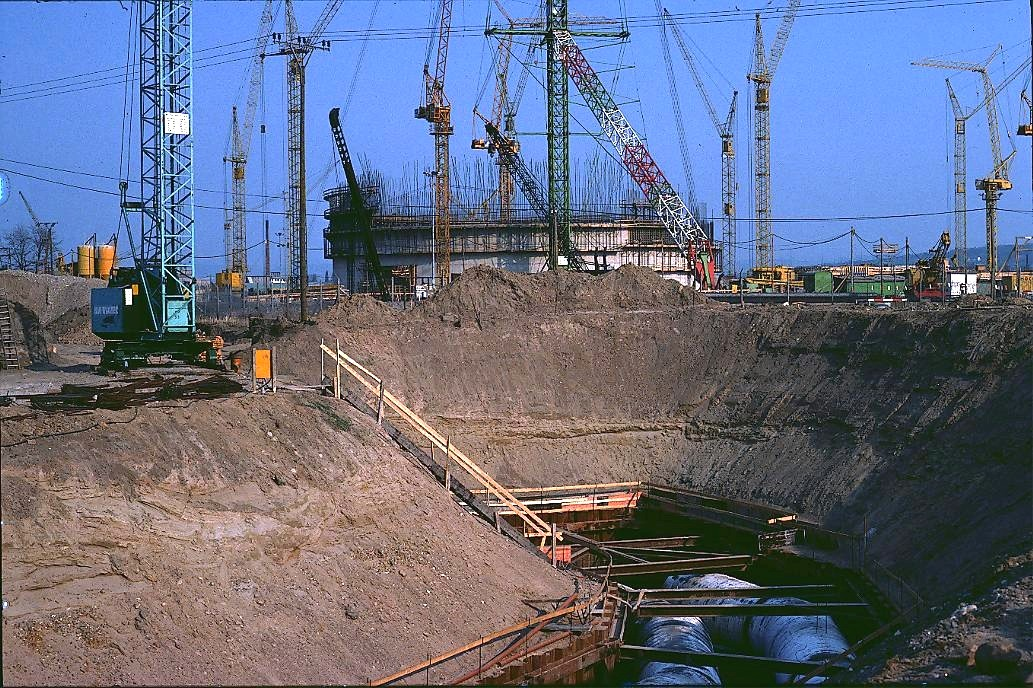
Construction as of 5 April 1976
