= Kaltenengers =

- Municipality
- Coat of arms

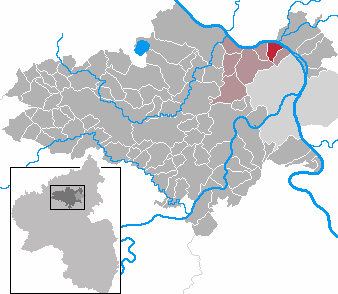
- Location of Kaltenengers within Mayen-Koblenz district
- Interactive map of Kaltenengers
- Location within Germany Location within Rhineland-Palatinate
- Coordinates: 50°25′02″N 7°32′37″E
- Country: Germany
- State: Rhineland-Palatinate
- District: Mayen-Koblenz
- Municipal assoc.: Weißenthurm

Government
  - Mayor (2019–24): Jürgen Karbach

Area
  - Total: 3.07 km^{2} (1.19 sq mi)
- Elevation: 63 m (207 ft)

Population (2025-12-31)
  - Total: 2,227
  - Density: 725/km^{2} (1,880/sq mi)
- Time zone: UTC+01:00 (CET)
  - Summer (DST): UTC+02:00 (CEST)
- Postal codes: 56220
- Dialling codes: 02630
- Vehicle registration: MYK
- Website: www.kaltenengers.de

Kaltenengers is a municipality in the district of Mayen-Koblenz in Rhineland-Palatinate, western Germany.
