= Kemmenau =

- Municipality
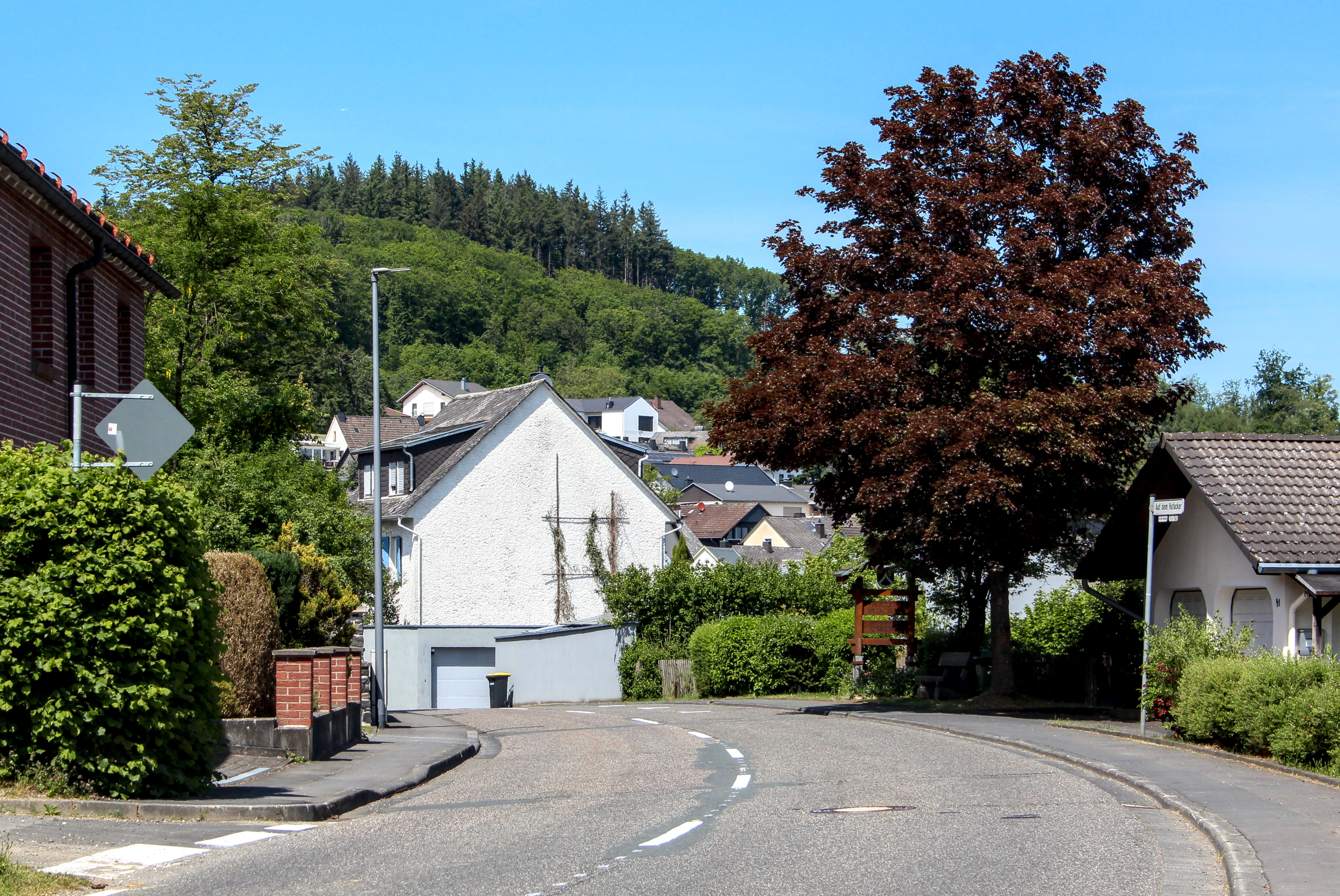

- Coat of arms

- Location of Kemmenau within Rhein-Lahn-Kreis district
- Interactive map of Kemmenau
- Location within Germany Location within Rhineland-Palatinate
- Coordinates: 50°20′52″N 7°45′3″E
- Country: Germany
- State: Rhineland-Palatinate
- District: Rhein-Lahn-Kreis
- Municipal assoc.: Bad Ems-Nassau

Government
  - Mayor (2019–24): Norbert Jachtenfuchs

Area
  - Total: 3.78 km^{2} (1.46 sq mi)
- Elevation: 382 m (1,253 ft)

Population (2025-12-31)
  - Total: 500
  - Density: 130/km^{2} (340/sq mi)
- Time zone: UTC+01:00 (CET)
  - Summer (DST): UTC+02:00 (CEST)
- Postal codes: 56132
- Dialling codes: 02603
- Vehicle registration: EMS, DIZ, GOH
- Website: www.kemmenau.de

Kemmenau (German pronunciation: [ˈkɛmənaʊ]) is a municipality in the district of Rhein-Lahn, in the Rhineland-Palatinate, in western Germany. It belongs to the association community of Bad Ems-Nassau.

Although Kemmenau is already mentioned in 1320, and is maybe even some centuries older, the village became a municipality only between 1816 and 1821. The greater part had previously belonged to Bad Ems, the smaller part to nearby Dausenau. Also remarkable are the prehistoric traces discoverable immediately behind the village, the still easily recognizable Roman Limes and a prehistoric circular entrenchment on the 'First'. The name of the town derives, perhaps, from "Kemmenate", which would refer to a fortified house on the old road from Bad Ems into the Westerwald.
