= Weißenthurm (Verbandsgemeinde) =

- Verbandsgemeinde
- Location of Weißenthurm within Mayen-Koblenz district
- Interactive map of Weißenthurm
- Location within Germany Location within Rhineland-Palatinate
- Coordinates: 50°24′N 7°28′E
- Country: Germany
- State: Rhineland-Palatinate
- District: Mayen-Koblenz
- Seat: Weißenthurm
- Subdivisions: 7 municipalities

Area
  - Total: 52.65 km^{2} (20.33 sq mi)

Population (2025-12-31)
  - Total: 34,733
  - Density: 659.7/km^{2} (1,709/sq mi)
- Time zone: UTC+01:00 (CET)
  - Summer (DST): UTC+02:00 (CEST)
- Website: www.verbandsgemeindeweissenthurm.de

Weißenthurm is a Verbandsgemeinde ("collective municipality") in the district of Mayen-Koblenz, Rhineland-Palatinate, Germany. The seat of the municipality and its administrative headquarters is in Weißenthurm. The Verbandsgemeinde of Weißenthurm is a local authority in the Mayen-Koblenz district in Rhineland-Palatinate. The municipality has two towns, Mülheim-Kärlich and Weißenthurm, and five other local municipalities. It has 35,279 residents and is one of the largest municipalities in Rhineland-Palatinate.

The Verbandsgemeinde Weißenthurm consists of the following Ortsgemeinden ("local municipalities"):

1. Bassenheim
2. Kaltenengers
3. Kettig
4. Mülheim-Kärlich
5. Sankt Sebastian
6. Urmitz
7. Weißenthurm

== List of mayors ==
The following is the list of Mayors of the municipality:

- 1977–2010: Walter Weinbach (CDU)
- 2010–2018: Georg Hollmann (CDU)
- since 2018: Thomas Przybylla (CDU)

In the direct election on November 19, 2017, Thomas Przybylla defeated his only opponent, Sven Kreienbrock (SPD), with a share of the vote of 72.9%. He began his eight-year term on June 27, 2018. His predecessor, Georg Hollmann, did not run again.
