= Becheln =

- Municipality
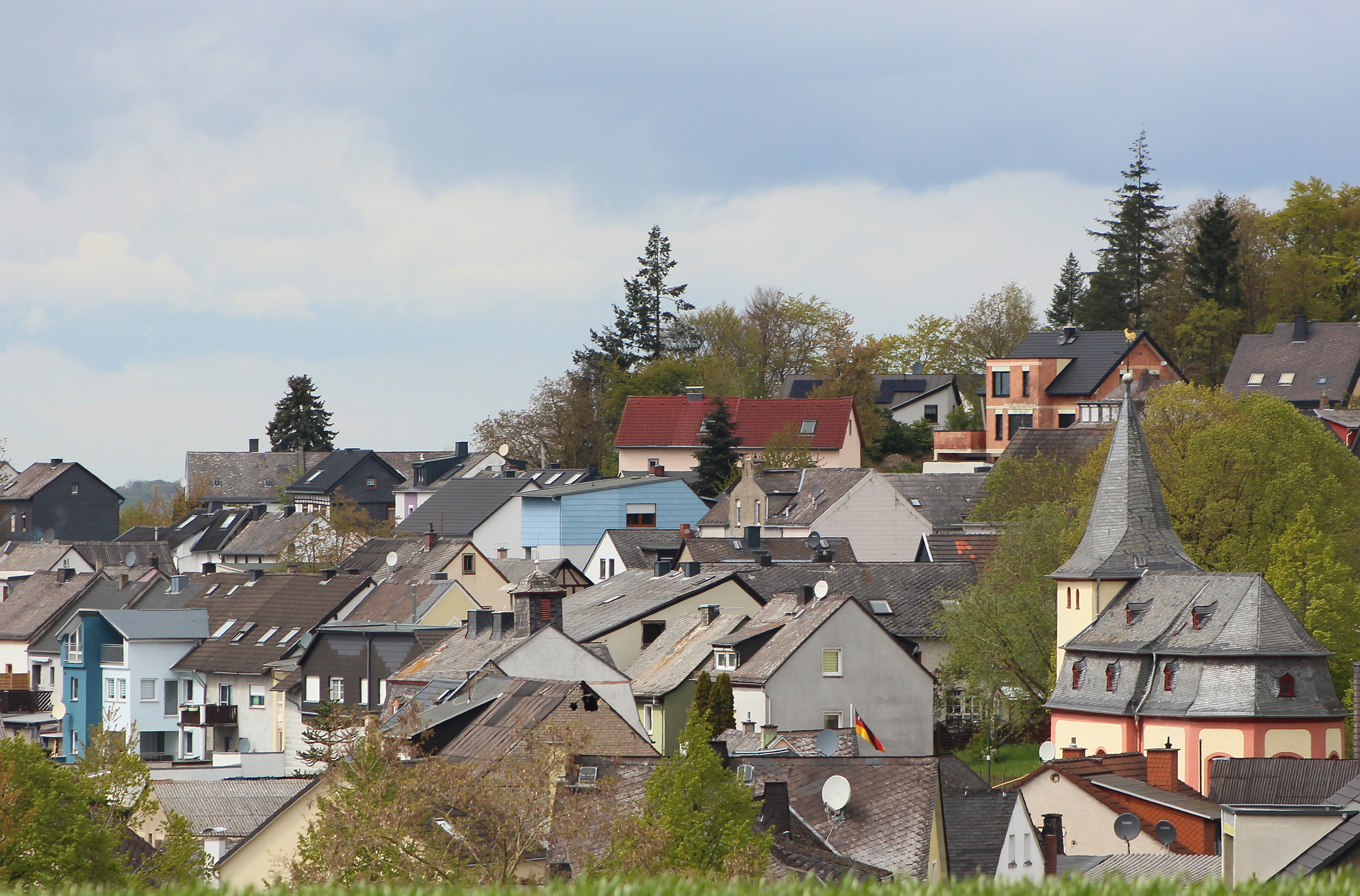

- Coat of arms

- Location of Becheln within Rhein-Lahn-Kreis district
- Interactive map of Becheln
- Location within Germany Location within Rhineland-Palatinate
- Coordinates: 50°17′34.93″N 7°43′4.54″E
- Country: Germany
- State: Rhineland-Palatinate
- District: Rhein-Lahn-Kreis
- Municipal assoc.: Bad Ems-Nassau

Government
  - Mayor (2019–24): Michaela Lehmler

Area
  - Total: 4.41 km^{2} (1.70 sq mi)
- Elevation: 380 m (1,250 ft)

Population (2025-12-31)
  - Total: 662
  - Density: 150/km^{2} (389/sq mi)
- Time zone: UTC+01:00 (CET)
  - Summer (DST): UTC+02:00 (CEST)
- Postal codes: 56132
- Dialling codes: 02603
- Vehicle registration: EMS, DIZ, GOH

Becheln is a municipality in the district of Rhein-Lahn, in Rhineland-Palatinate, in western Germany. It belongs to the association community of Bad Ems-Nassau.
