= Frücht =

- Municipality
- Coat of arms

- Location of Frücht within Rhein-Lahn-Kreis district
- Interactive map of Frücht
- Location within Germany Location within Rhineland-Palatinate
- Coordinates: 50°18′49″N 7°40′39″E
- Country: Germany
- State: Rhineland-Palatinate
- District: Rhein-Lahn-Kreis
- Municipal assoc.: Bad Ems-Nassau

Government
  - Mayor (2019–24): Andreas Schilbach (FW)

Area
  - Total: 5.53 km^{2} (2.14 sq mi)
- Elevation: 260 m (850 ft)

Population (2025-12-31)
  - Total: 578
  - Density: 105/km^{2} (271/sq mi)
- Time zone: UTC+01:00 (CET)
  - Summer (DST): UTC+02:00 (CEST)
- Postal codes: 56132
- Dialling codes: 02603
- Vehicle registration: EMS, DIZ, GOH
- Website: Official site

Frücht (German pronunciation: [fʁʏçt]) is a small municipality in the federal state of Rhineland-Palatinate in western Germany. It is part of the Bad Ems-Nassau Municipal Association (German: Verbandsgemeinde) in the Rhein-Lahn District. It is located in the Taunus Mountains about 7 kilometers (4.3 mi) southwest of Bad Ems and about 7 km (4.3 mi) east of Lahnstein.

== History ==
Frücht was first mentioned in 1159 as Wruhte. It belonged to the Countship of Nassau until 1613, when it was sold to Johann Gottfried vom Stein. Frücht thereafter belonged, together with Schweighausen, to the Imperial-immediate Barony vom Stein. This lower-nobility family had its seat at the Stein'sche Schloss in Nassau.

The last owner from this house was Baron (German: Reichsfreiherr) Heinrich Friedrich Karl vom und zum Stein (October 25, 1757 – June 29, 1831), a Prussian statesman who introduced reforms, including abolition of serfdom, that paved the way for the unification of Germany. After his retirement in 1815, Baron vom Stein settled in Frücht, where he still owned significant property and forest lands. There he built a family tomb for his parents. After his death in 1831, the tomb also became his own final resting place.

In 1804/06, Frücht was made a part of the newly formed Duchy of Nassau and in 1866 to the Prussian province of Hesse-Nassau. After World War II, it was part of the French occupation zone. In 1947, it became part of the newly founded state of Rhineland-Palatinate.

== Visitor attractions ==
Near the Protestant church on the northern outskirts of Frücht is the family tomb of the Barons vom und zum Stein. The best-known member of the family, Heinrich Friedrich Karl vom Stein, is buried there. His oldest daughter, the Countess Giech, sought artistic input from architect Sulpiz Boisserée for the construction of a Neo-Gothic chapel over the tomb, which was built according to the design of Munich architect Joseph Daniel Ohlmüller between 1836 and 1843. The marble relief on vom Stein's grave monument was created between 1837 and 1840 by Munich sculptor Ludwig Michael Schwanthaler.

Frücht has well-marked hiking trails, including the Schweizertal (“Swiss Valley”) to Miellen on the Lahn.

== Politics ==
=== Municipal council ===
The Municipal council (German: Gemeinderat) consists of 12 members. Their distribution by party, as of the 13 June 2004 election (voter turnout: 77.6%), is as follows:

	Free Voters	Social Democrats	Total
2004	7	5	12

== Economy ==
While Frücht has always had a strong agriculture sector, its business sector has remained small. This has meant that the town has been affected by declining tax revenues. Nevertheless, its financial situation is relatively good thanks to capital reserves.

Beginning in the early 1970s, Frücht has experienced a construction boom under a village renewal plan. By opening up new land to development, the community has been able to meet a strong demand for housing in attractive surroundings while still being close to the city. In 1974, the newly built neighborhood "Am Hofacker" was developed. It was followed by the development in the locality called “In den Wiesen / Vordertal”, including the new streets "Grummetwiese", "Im Vogelsang" and the "Mühlenweg." A school built in Frücht in 1962-1963 was renovated into a kindergarten in 1973.

The local Protestant parish took over the sponsorship of the kindergarten, which is utilized by children from Frücht and the neighboring municipality of Becheln. The village cemetery was expanded and in 1977 a new village well was drilled. A multi-purpose community center as opened in Frücht after two years of construction in 1980. A significant share of the construction costs of 500,000 DM was raised through voluntary donations of the residents. A tennis facility was opened next to the hall in 1989, adding an athletics facility and a football pitch.

== Coat of arms ==
The municipal coat of arms of Frücht was adopted in 1983. It includes references to the town's historical owners, with the golden Lion of the House of Nassau and the five-petaled red and blue Rose of the Barony vom Stein.

== Sources ==
- Frücht page on the Bad Ems Municipal Association website.
