= Detlev Pilger =

German politician

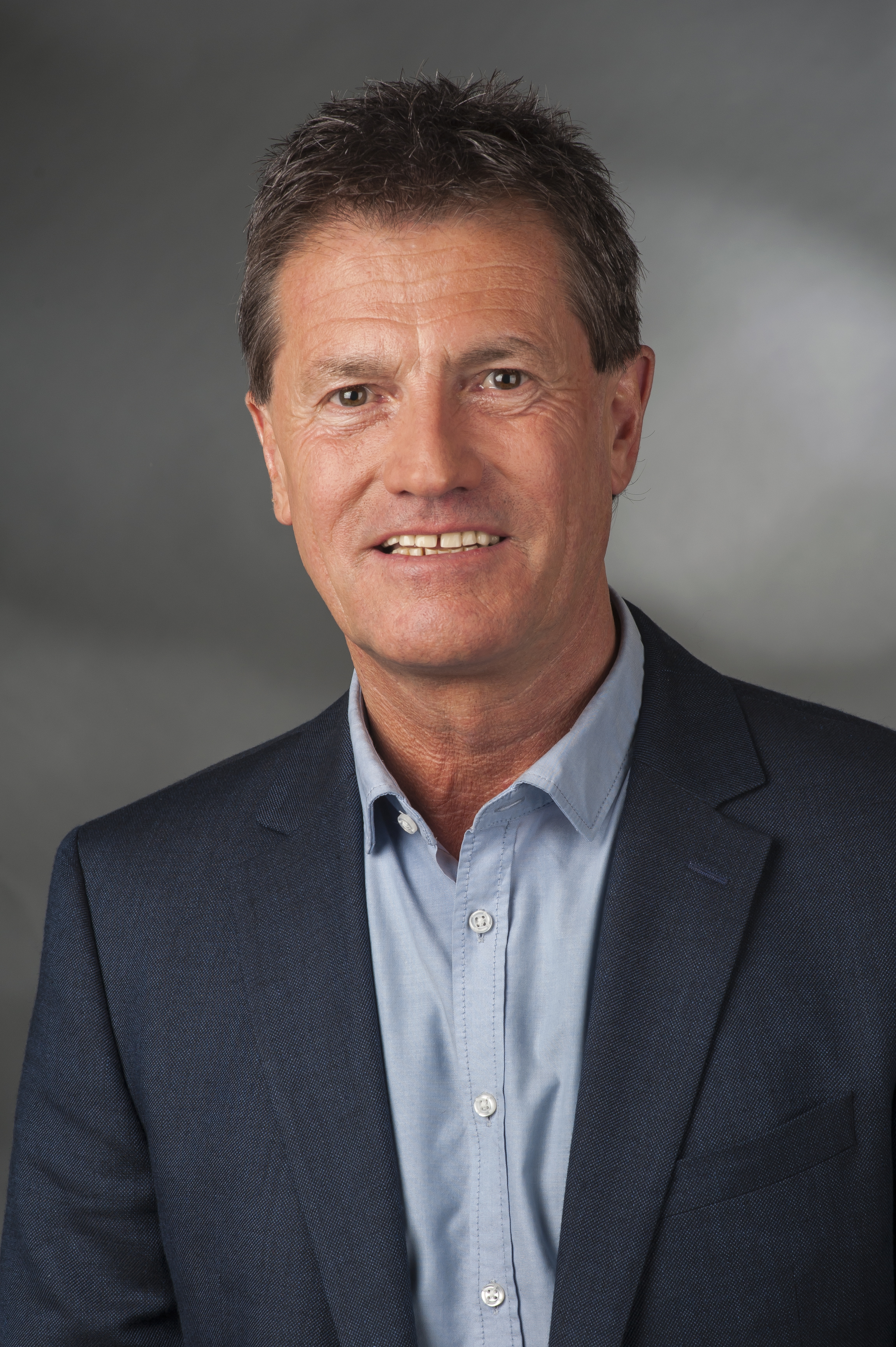
- Detlev Pilger in 2014

Member of the Bundestag
- Incumbent
- Assumed office 2013

Personal details
- Born: 29 April 1955 (age 70) Koblenz, West Germany (now Germany)
- Party: SPD

Detlev Pilger (born 29 April 1955) is a German politician. Born in Koblenz, Rhineland-Palatinate, he represents the SPD. Detlev Pilger has served as a member of the Bundestag from the state of Rhineland-Palatinate since 2013.

== Life ==
He became member of the bundestag after the 2013 German federal election. He is a member of the sports committee and the committee for environment, nature conservation and nuclear safety.
