= Weißenthurm =

- Town
- Coat of arms

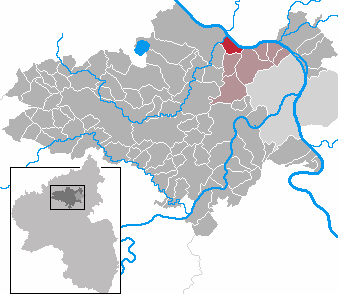
- Location of Weißenthurm within Mayen-Koblenz district
- Interactive map of Weißenthurm
- Location within Germany Location within Rhineland-Palatinate
- Coordinates: 50°24′52″N 7°27′38″E
- Country: Germany
- State: Rhineland-Palatinate
- District: Mayen-Koblenz
- Municipal assoc.: Weißenthurm

Government
  - Mayor (2024-): Johannes Juchem (FW)

Area
  - Total: 3.99 km^{2} (1.54 sq mi)
- Elevation: 65 m (213 ft)

Population (2025-12-31)
  - Total: 8,944
  - Density: 2,240/km^{2} (5,810/sq mi)
- Time zone: UTC+01:00 (CET)
  - Summer (DST): UTC+02:00 (CEST)
- Postal codes: 56575
- Dialling codes: 02637
- Vehicle registration: MYK
- Website: www.weissenthurm.de

Weißenthurm (German pronunciation: [vaɪsn̩ˈtʊʁm]) is a town in the district of Mayen-Koblenz, in Rhineland-Palatinate, Germany. It is situated on the left bank of the Rhine, opposite Neuwied, approximately 12 km northwest of Koblenz.

The town is spelled with an ß which may be replaced by ss if not available (Weissenthurm).

Weißenthurm is the seat of the Verbandsgemeinde ("collective municipality") Weißenthurm.

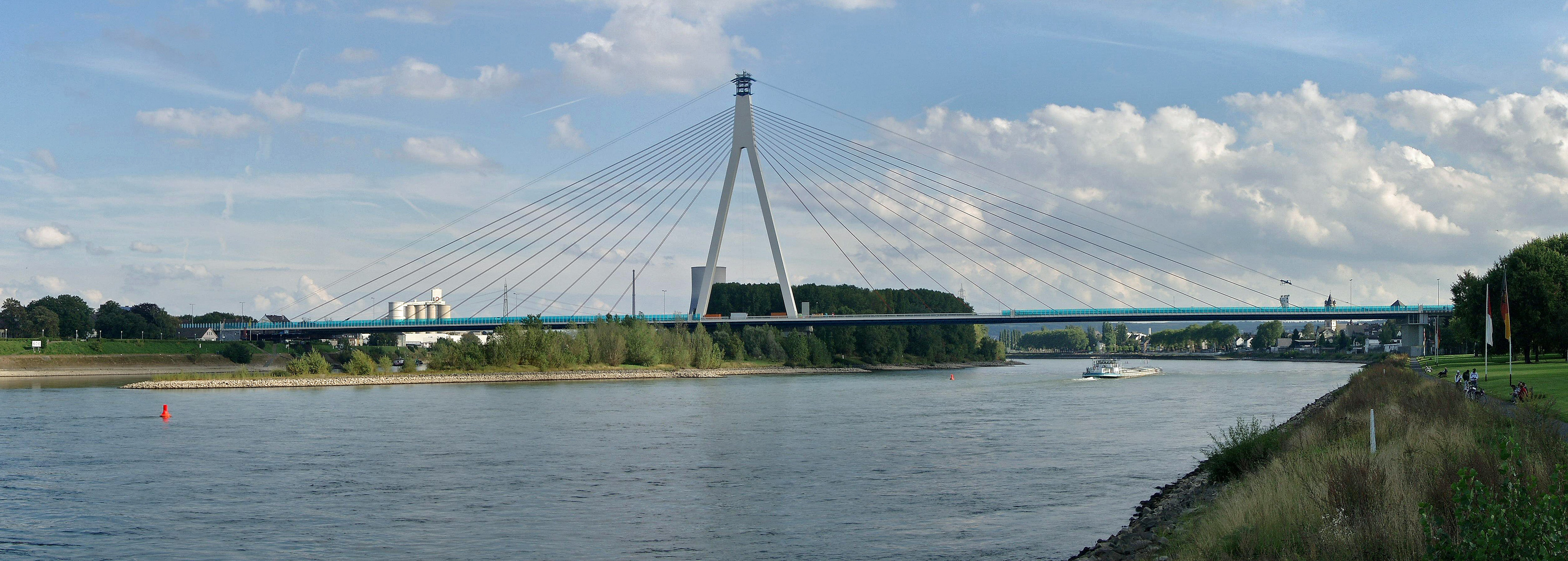
Raiffeisenbrücke between Neuwied and Weißenthurm

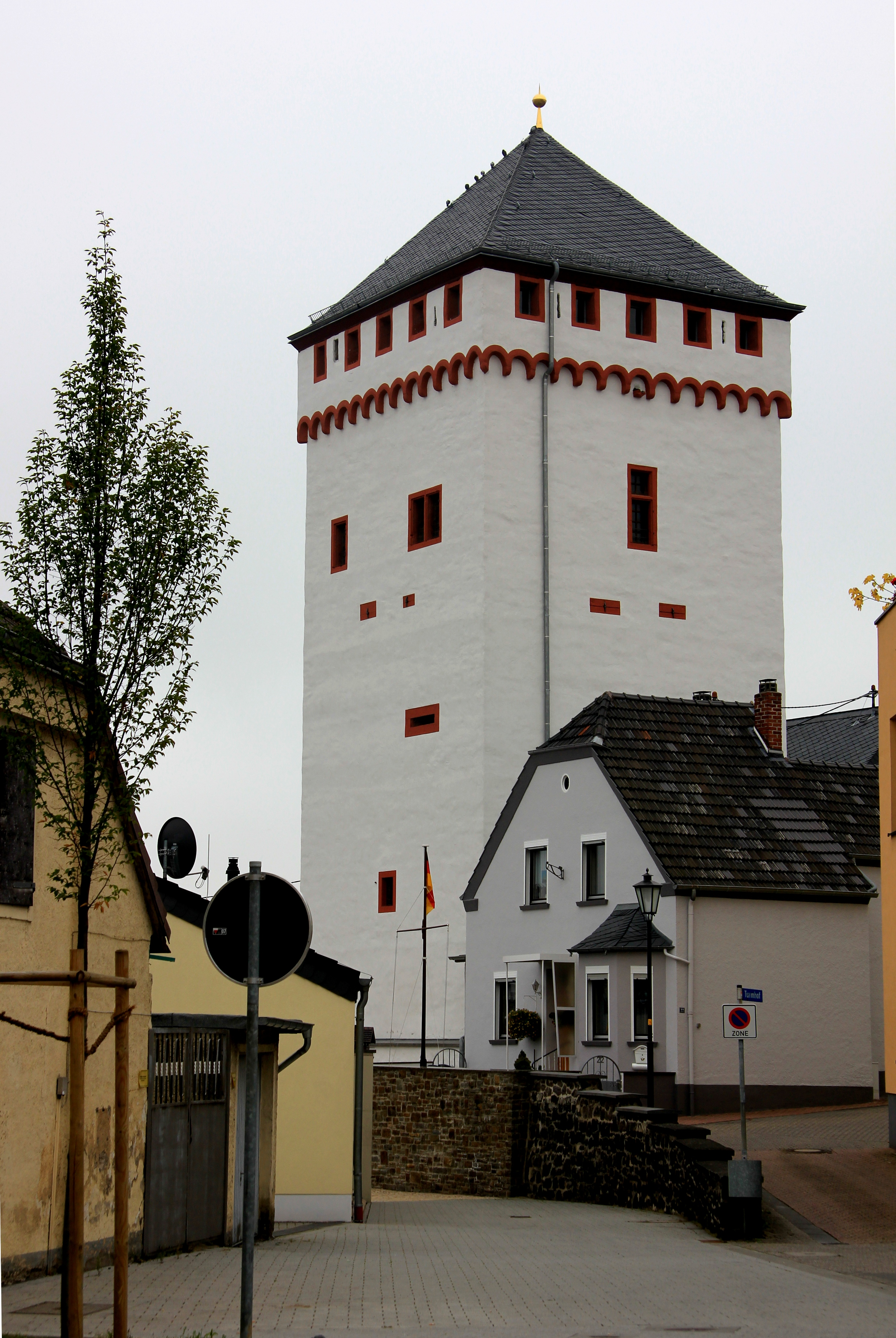
The White Tower, which gave the name to Weißenthurm

== Transportation ==
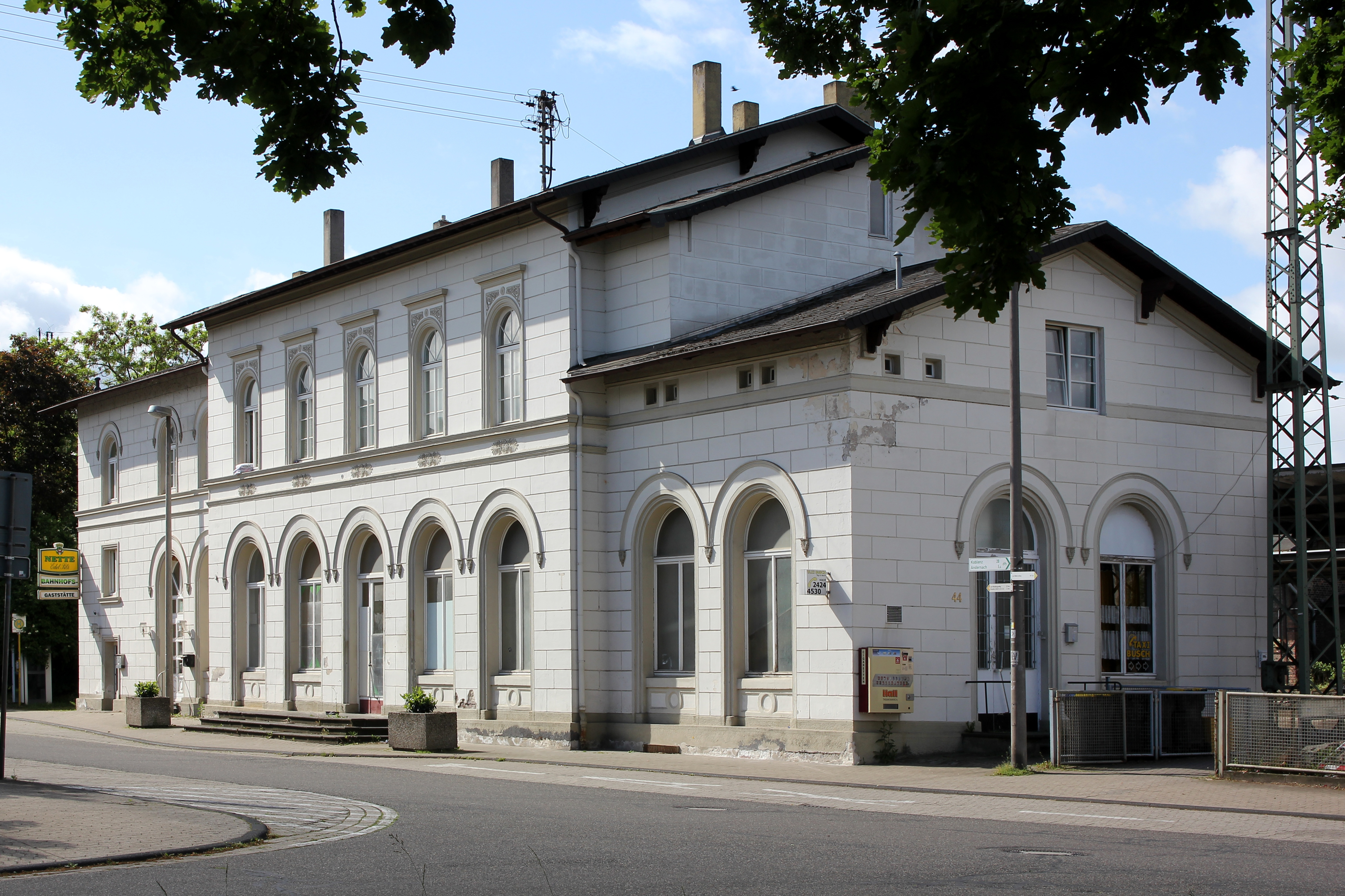
Weißenthurm train station

There's a train station located in Weißenthurm which is served by lines RB23 (Lahn-Eifel-Bahn, Limburg - Koblenz - Andernach - Mayen) as well as RB26 (Mainz - Koblenz - Bonn - Cologne).
