= Fachbach =

- Municipality
- Coat of arms

- Location of Fachbach within Rhein-Lahn-Kreis district
- Interactive map of Fachbach
- Location within Germany Location within Rhineland-Palatinate
- Coordinates: 50°20′24″N 7°41′26″E
- Country: Germany
- State: Rhineland-Palatinate
- District: Rhein-Lahn-Kreis
- Municipal assoc.: Bad Ems-Nassau

Government
  - Mayor (2019–24): Dieter Görg

Area
  - Total: 2.23 km^{2} (0.86 sq mi)
- Elevation: 76 m (249 ft)

Population (2025-12-31)
  - Total: 1,293
  - Density: 580/km^{2} (1,500/sq mi)
- Time zone: UTC+01:00 (CET)
  - Summer (DST): UTC+02:00 (CEST)
- Postal codes: 56133
- Dialling codes: 02603
- Vehicle registration: EMS, DIZ, GOH
- Website: www.fachbach.de

Fachbach (German pronunciation: [ˈfaxbax]) is a municipality in the district of Rhein-Lahn, in Rhineland-Palatinate, in western Germany. It belongs to the association community of Bad Ems-Nassau.

== History ==
Fachbach got its name from the Fachbach creek (literally: wicker basket creek). The official website states that the inhabitants fished trouts in former times with a wicker basket they called "Fach". The creek was first mentioned in 959 A.D., the village itself 1371 AD.

== Culture and Sightseeing ==
Recommendable is the "Nieverner Hütte", an iron works on the Fachbacher island Oberau in the Lahn river. Currently it belongs to Nievern and is a recognized industrial monument. The island Oberau was the location of the Gustav Fudickar "Schlafwohl" (literally: Sleepwell) upholstery and mattress factory (founded 1885) between the 60s and 70s. The Fudickar upholstery and mattress factory built the Fachbacher district "Auf der Oberau" and had patents of special spring mattresses. Today, the buildings on the island Oberau are used by various small businesses. In the forest of Fachbach fossils were found and the fauna shows many various butterflies, including very rare specimens.
