= Dausenau =

- Municipality
- Coat of arms

- Location of Dausenau within Rhein-Lahn-Kreis district
- Interactive map of Dausenau
- Location within Germany Location within Rhineland-Palatinate
- Coordinates: 50°20′07″N 7°45′50″E
- Country: Germany
- State: Rhineland-Palatinate
- District: Rhein-Lahn-Kreis
- Municipal assoc.: Bad Ems-Nassau

Government
  - Mayor (2019–24): Michele Wittler (SPD)

Area
  - Total: 9.81 km^{2} (3.79 sq mi)
- Elevation: 94 m (308 ft)

Population (2025-12-31)
  - Total: 1,241
  - Density: 127/km^{2} (328/sq mi)
- Time zone: UTC+01:00 (CET)
  - Summer (DST): UTC+02:00 (CEST)
- Postal codes: 56132
- Dialling codes: 02603
- Vehicle registration: EMS, DIZ, GOH
- Website: www.bad-ems.de

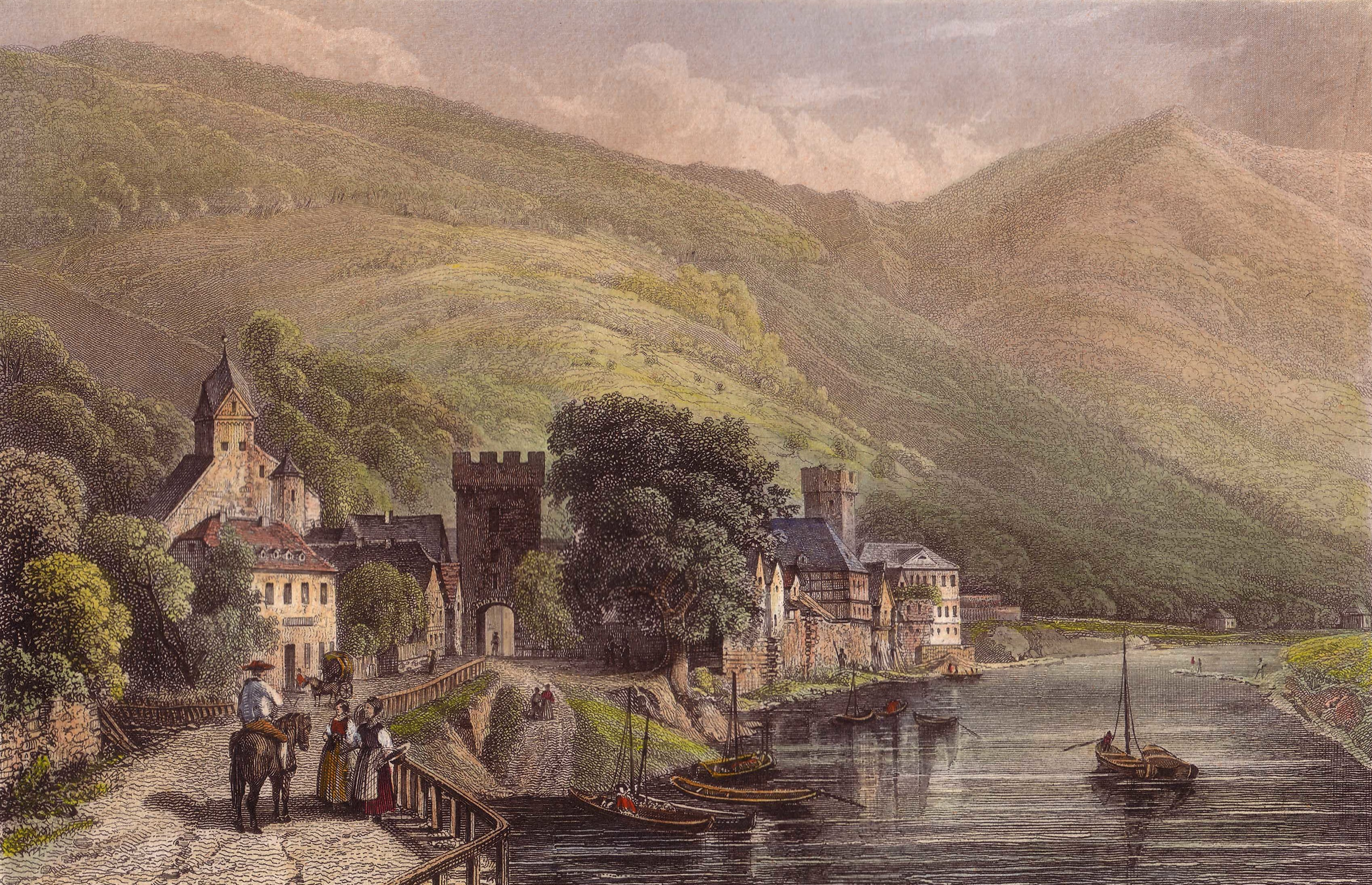
Colored steel engraving: "View from Dausenau", around 1844.

Dausenau is a municipality in the district of Rhein-Lahn, in Rhineland-Palatinate, in western Germany. It belongs to the association community of Bad Ems-Nassau.

Dausenau was one of the oldest possessions of the counts of Nassau and the arms thus show the lion of Nassau. The village was granted city rights in 1348, but these were later lost again. The seals of Dausenau showed from at least the 15th century until 1568 a seal with the arms and St. Castor as a supporter. St. Castor is the patron saint of the local church. In an 18th-century seal only the picture of Lady Justice was shown, not a shield with the lion. The present arms were granted in 1937 and go back to the old seal.

== Leaning Tower ==
The south-eastern watchtower in the historic city wall (most parts of which still exist) is being held for the most leaning tower in the world, outdoing the Guinness record holder, the Leaning Tower of Suurhusen, by 0.03 degrees, according to a 2003 measurement. However, the Book of Records denied entry, stating it was rather a ruin than a tower.

== Transport ==
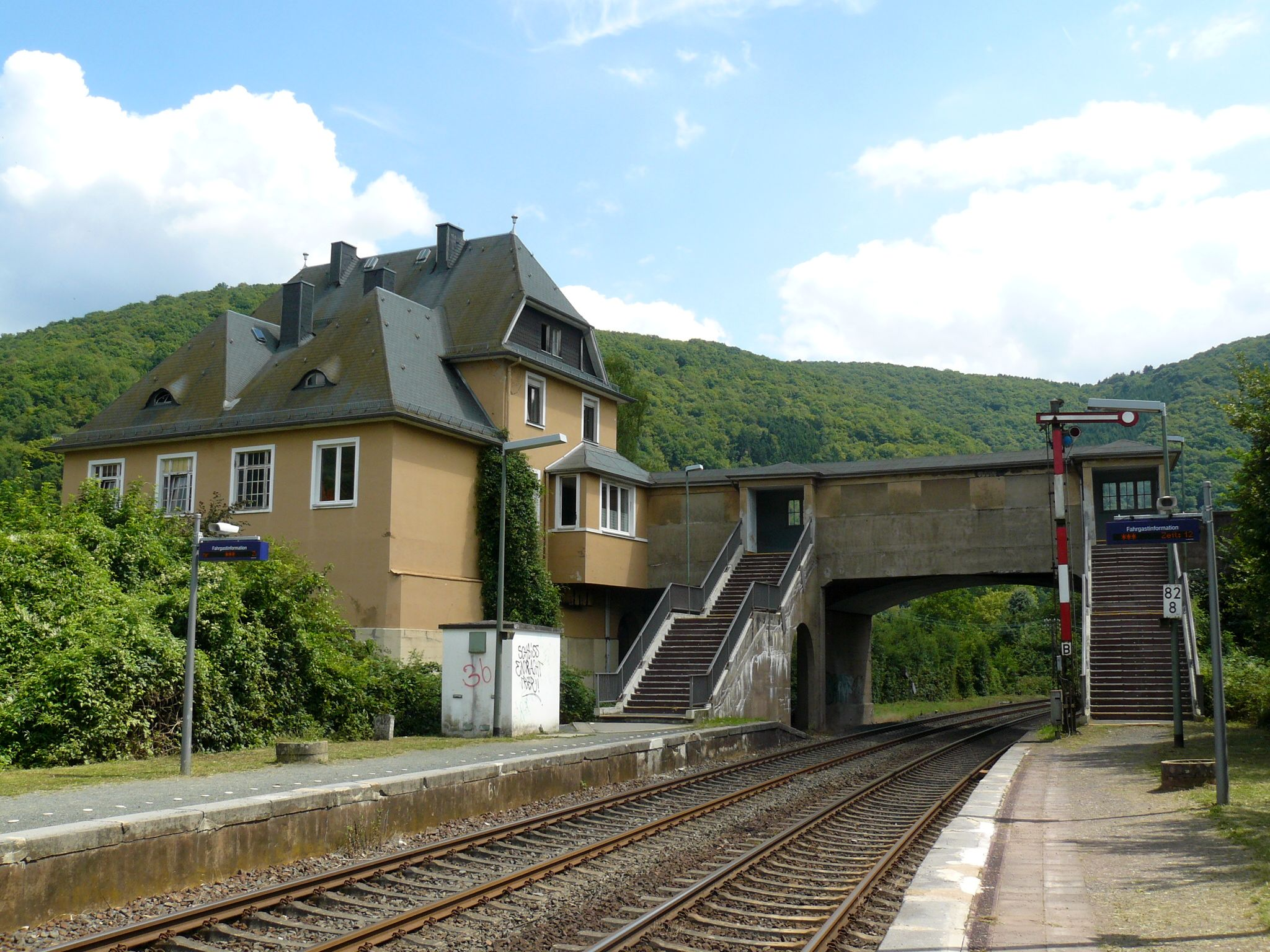
Dausenau station

The train station Dausenau is served by line RB23 which goes from Limburg via Diez, Bad Ems, Koblenz and Andernach to Mayen, operated by section Lahn-Eifel-Bahn of Deutsche Bahn.

== Gallery ==
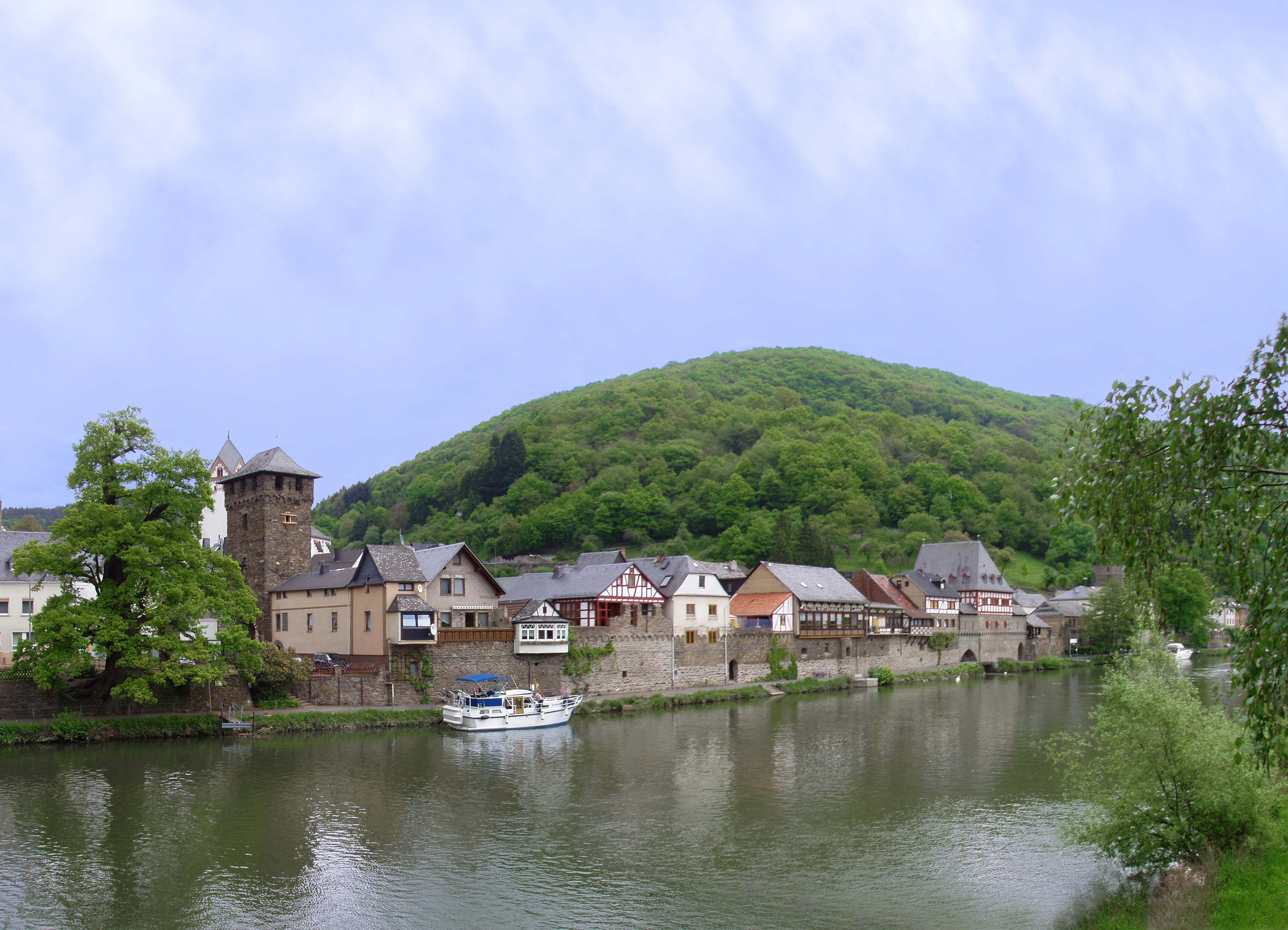
Dausenau on the river Lahn

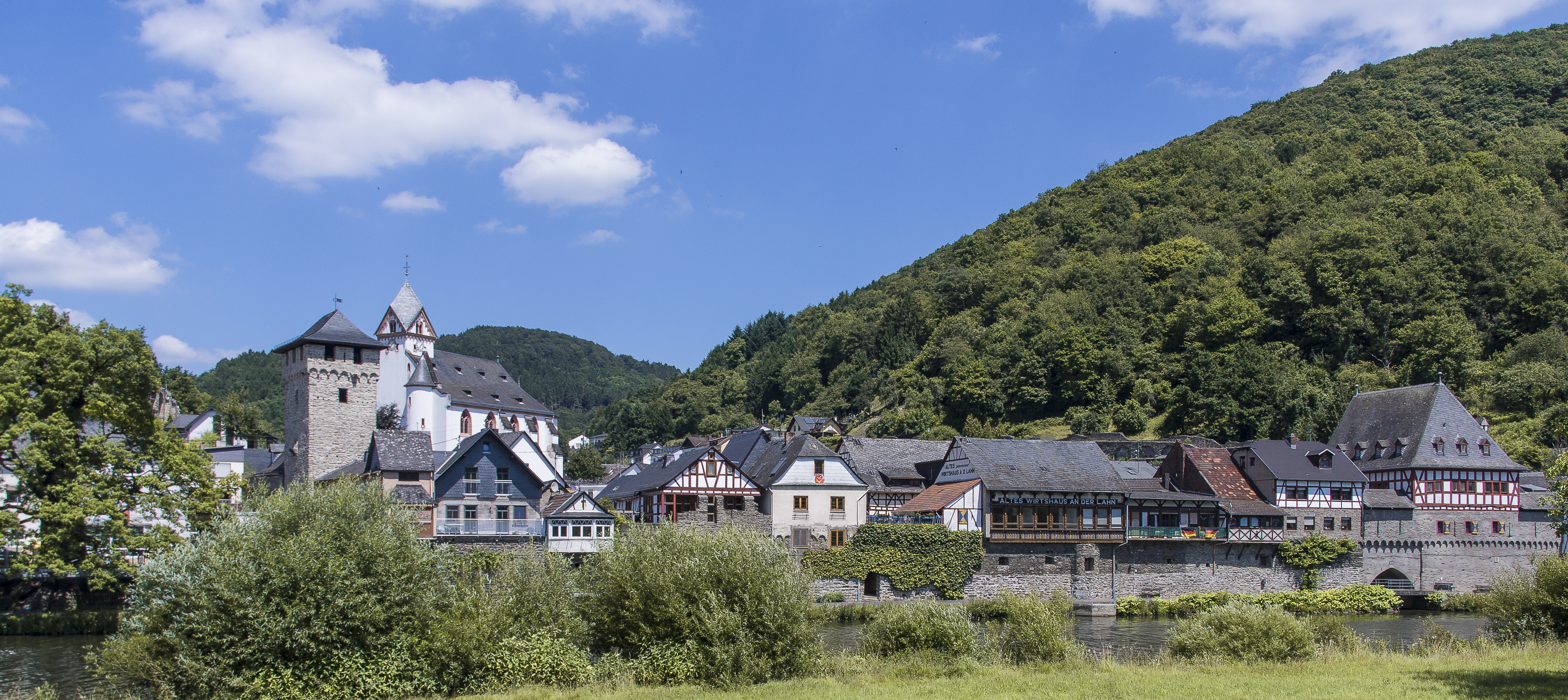

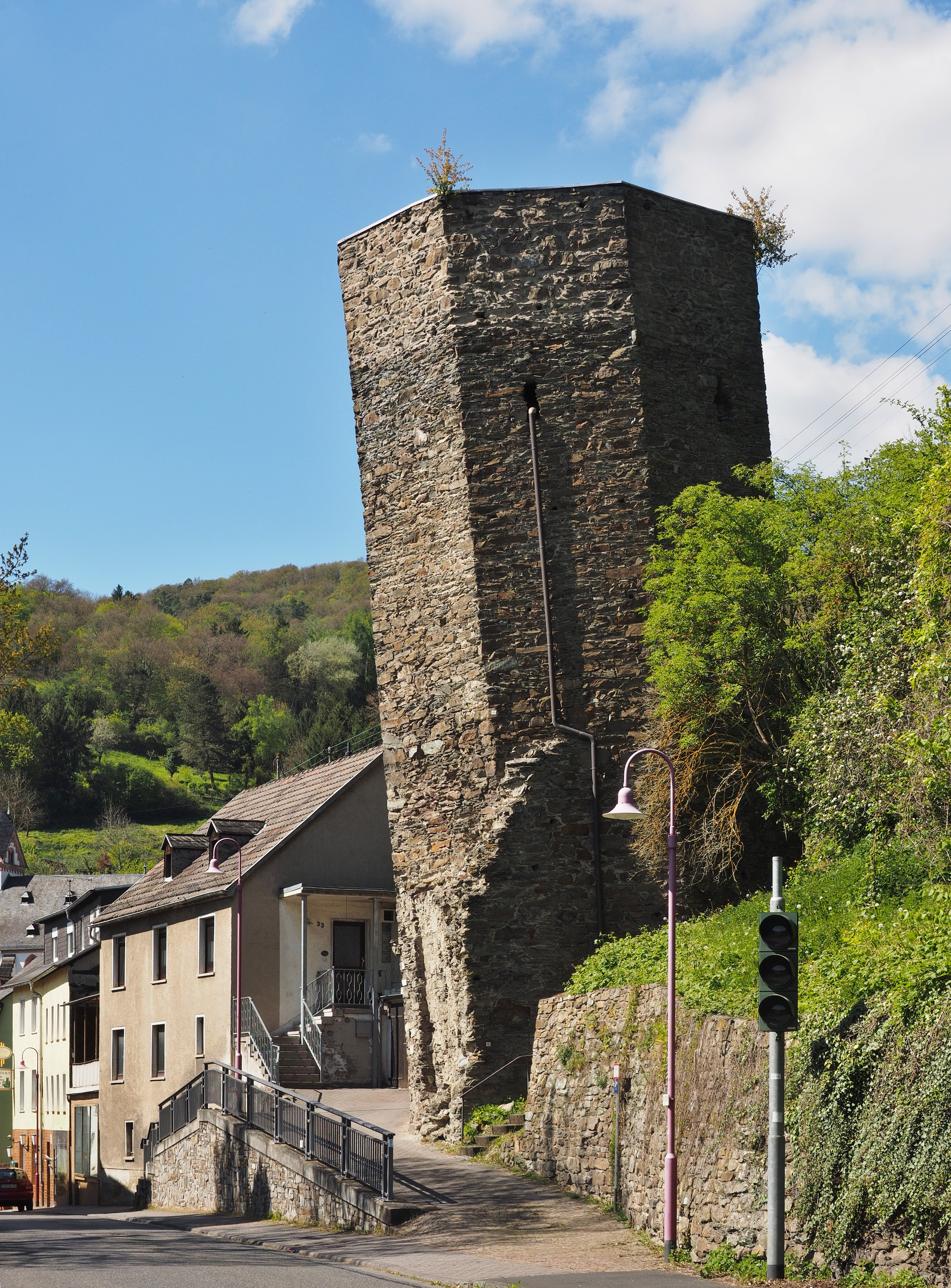
Leaning Tower

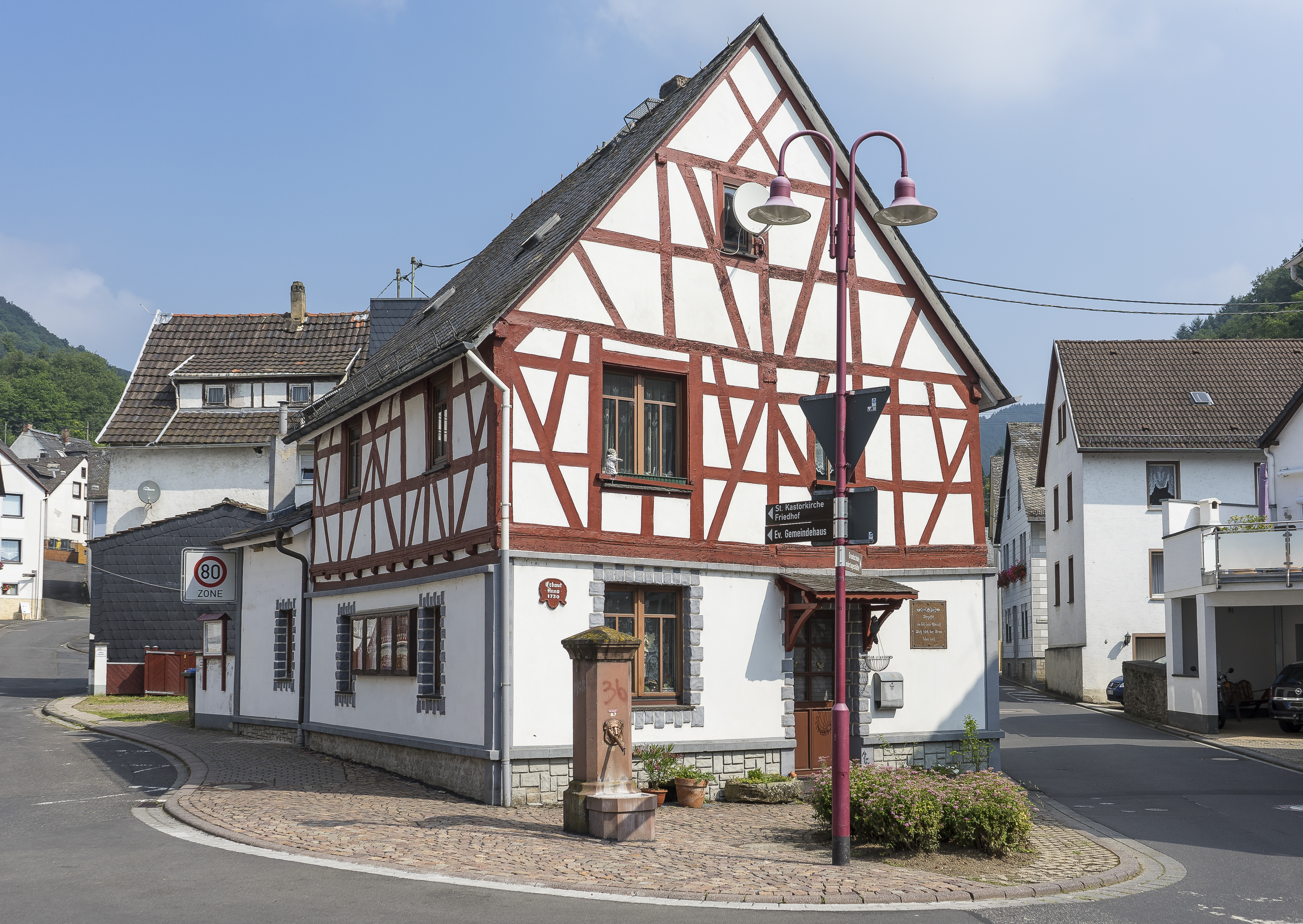

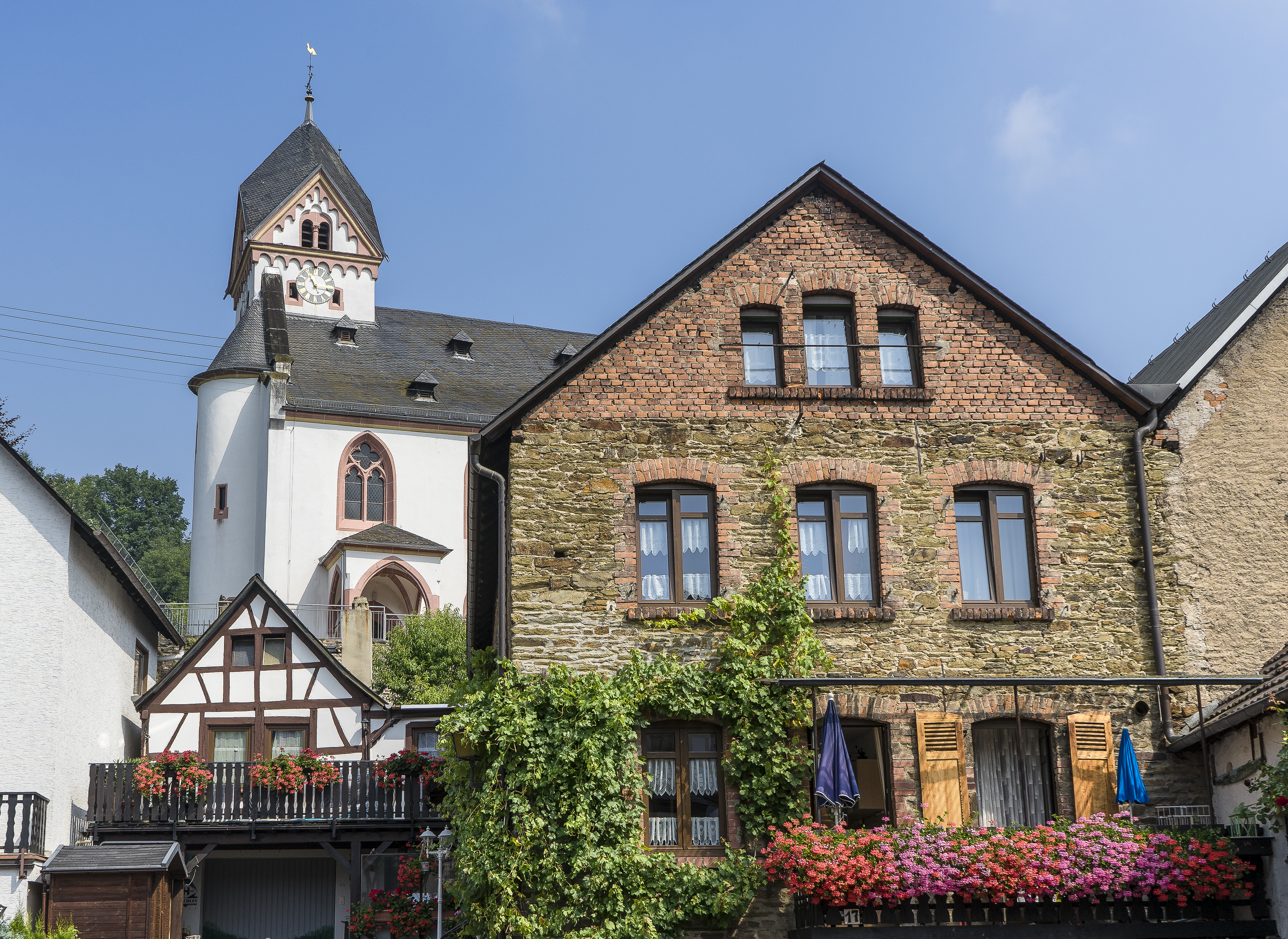

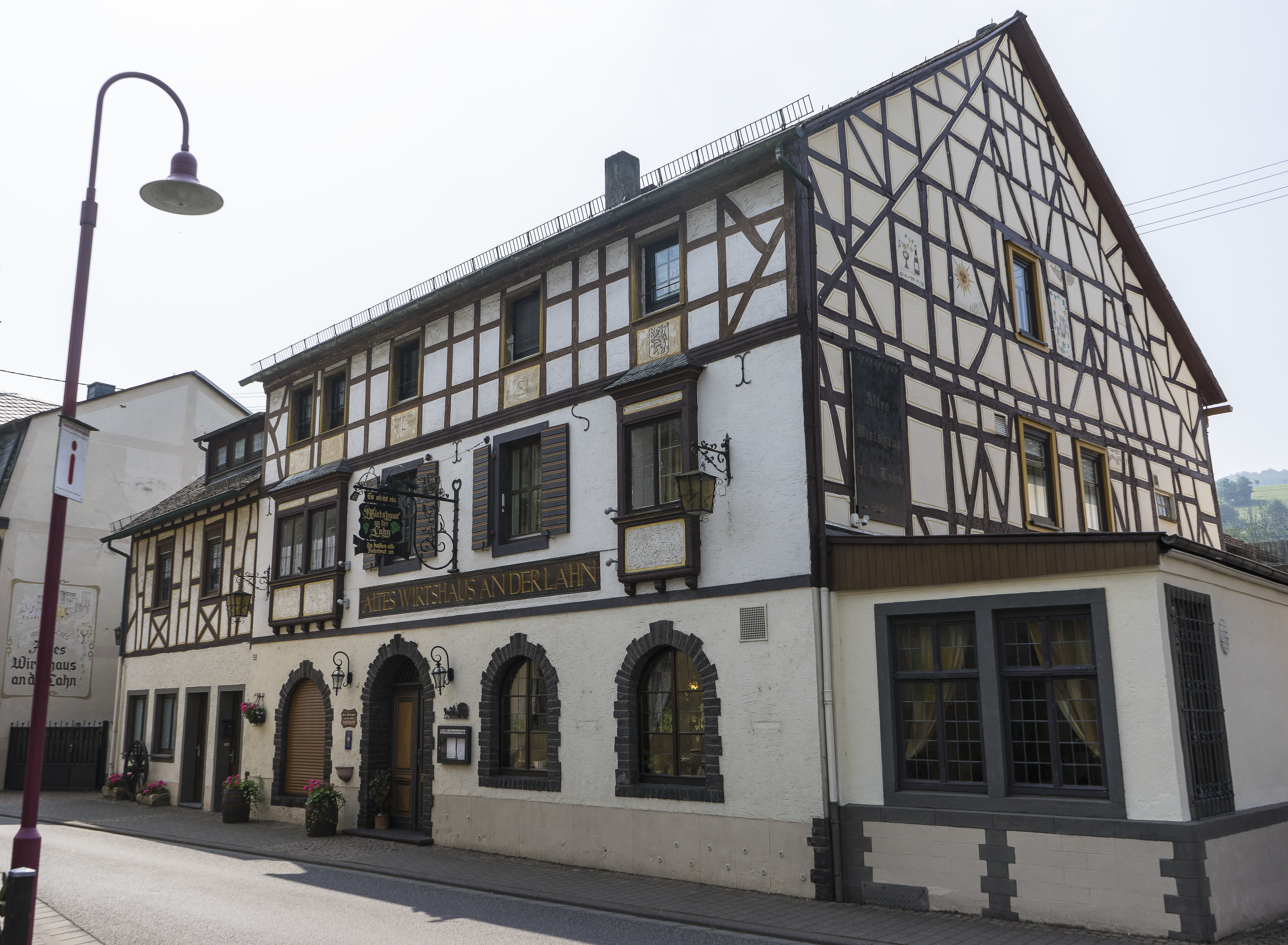

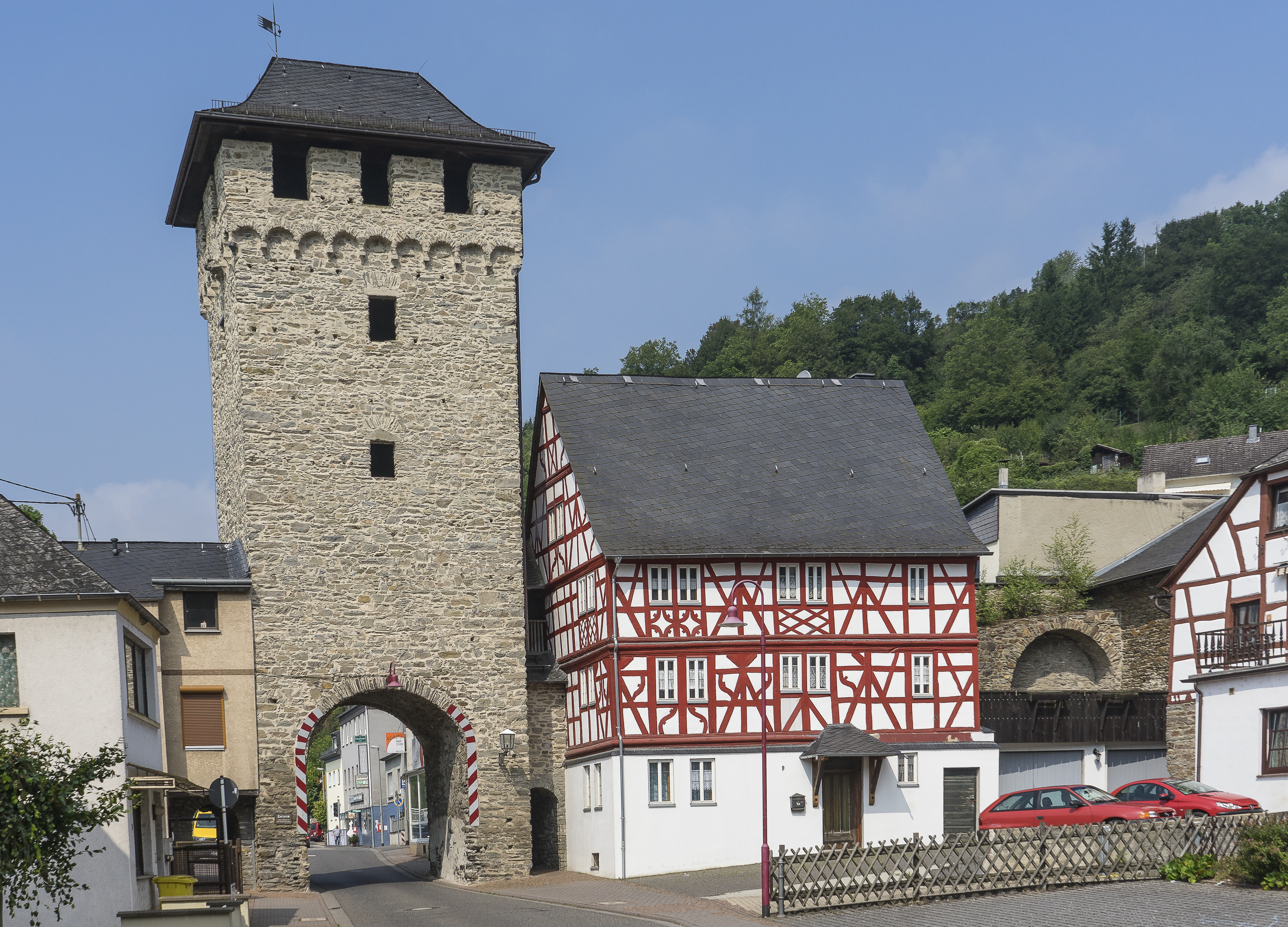
