= Miellen =

- Municipality
- Coat of arms

- Location of Miellen within Rhein-Lahn-Kreis district
- Interactive map of Miellen
- Location within Germany Location within Rhineland-Palatinate
- Coordinates: 50°19′37″N 7°40′12″E
- Country: Germany
- State: Rhineland-Palatinate
- District: Rhein-Lahn-Kreis
- Municipal assoc.: Bad Ems-Nassau

Government
  - Mayor (2019–24): Heiner Eggerath

Area
  - Total: 2.06 km^{2} (0.80 sq mi)
- Elevation: 85 m (279 ft)

Population (2025-12-31)
  - Total: 361
  - Density: 175/km^{2} (454/sq mi)
- Time zone: UTC+01:00 (CET)
  - Summer (DST): UTC+02:00 (CEST)
- Postal codes: 56132
- Dialling codes: 02603
- Vehicle registration: EMS, DIZ, GOH

Miellen (German pronunciation: [ˈmiːlən]) is a municipality in the district of Rhein-Lahn, in Rhineland-Palatinate, in western Germany. It belongs to the association community of Bad Ems-Nassau.
